= UK railway stations =

Interactive map of rail stations in Great Britain

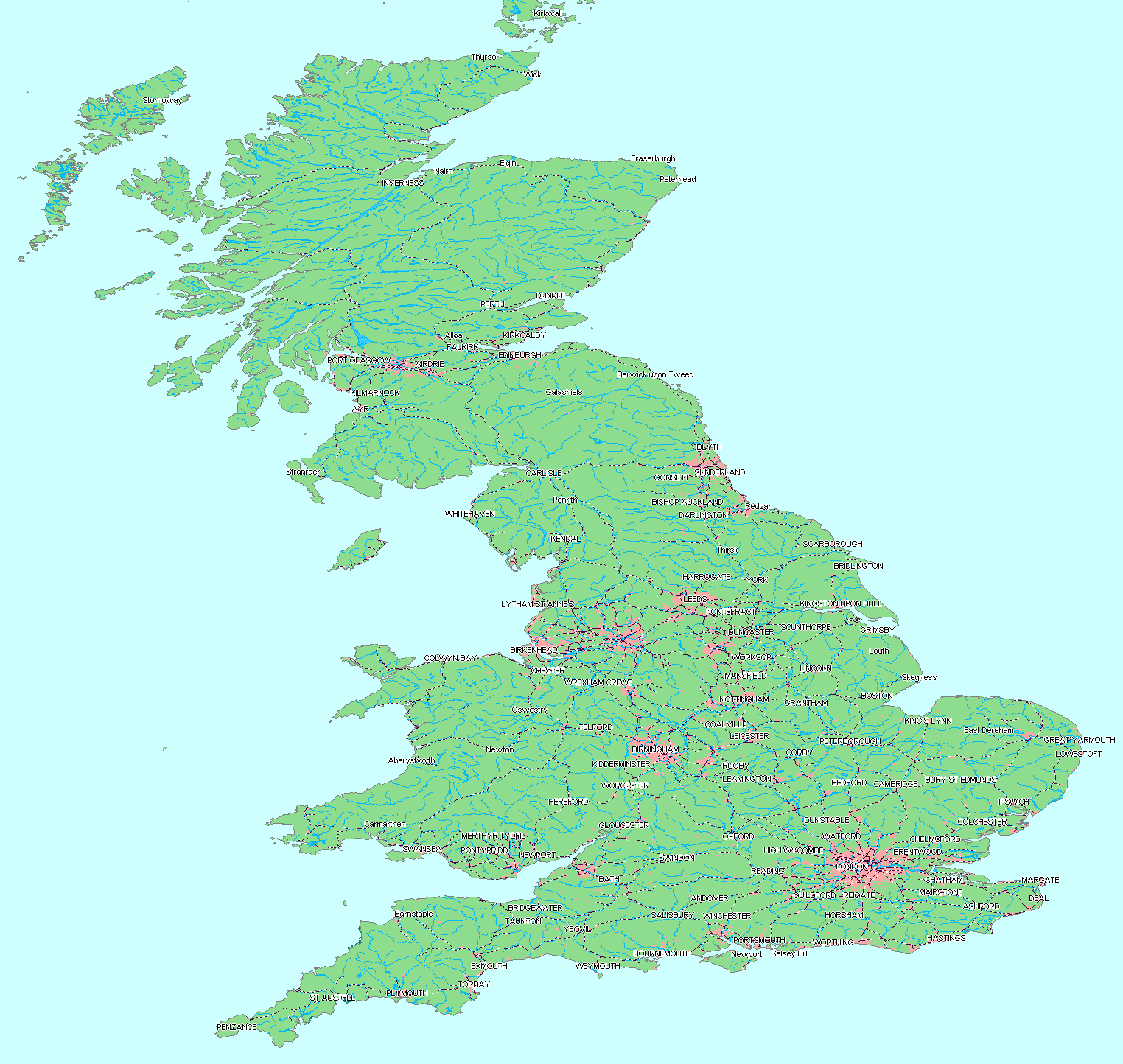
Click on the picture for an enlarged map of the rail network

List of railway stations in the United Kingdom, split alphabetically.

- UK railway stations – A
- UK railway stations – B
- UK railway stations – C
- UK railway stations – D
- UK railway stations – E
- UK railway stations – F
- UK railway stations – G
- UK railway stations – H
- UK railway stations – I
- UK railway stations – J
- UK railway stations – K
- UK railway stations – L
- UK railway stations – M
- UK railway stations – N
- UK railway stations – O
- UK railway stations – P
- UK railway stations – Q
- UK railway stations – R
- UK railway stations – S
- UK railway stations – T
- UK railway stations – U
- UK railway stations – V
- UK railway stations – W
- UK railway stations – Y

== See also ==
- Special-purpose railway stations in the United Kingdom
- List of closed railway stations in Great Britain
- List of heritage railway stations in the United Kingdom
- All the Stations
