= List of railway stations by country =

The exact number of railway stations (railroad stations in the US) worldwide, varies depending on the classification that is being used. The density of stations also varies between countries and regions, and has changed—sometimes drastically—over time with rail usage patterns.

== Africa ==
- Railway stations in Angola
- Railway stations in Benin
- Railway stations in Botswana
- Railway stations in Burkina Faso
- Railway stations in Cameroon

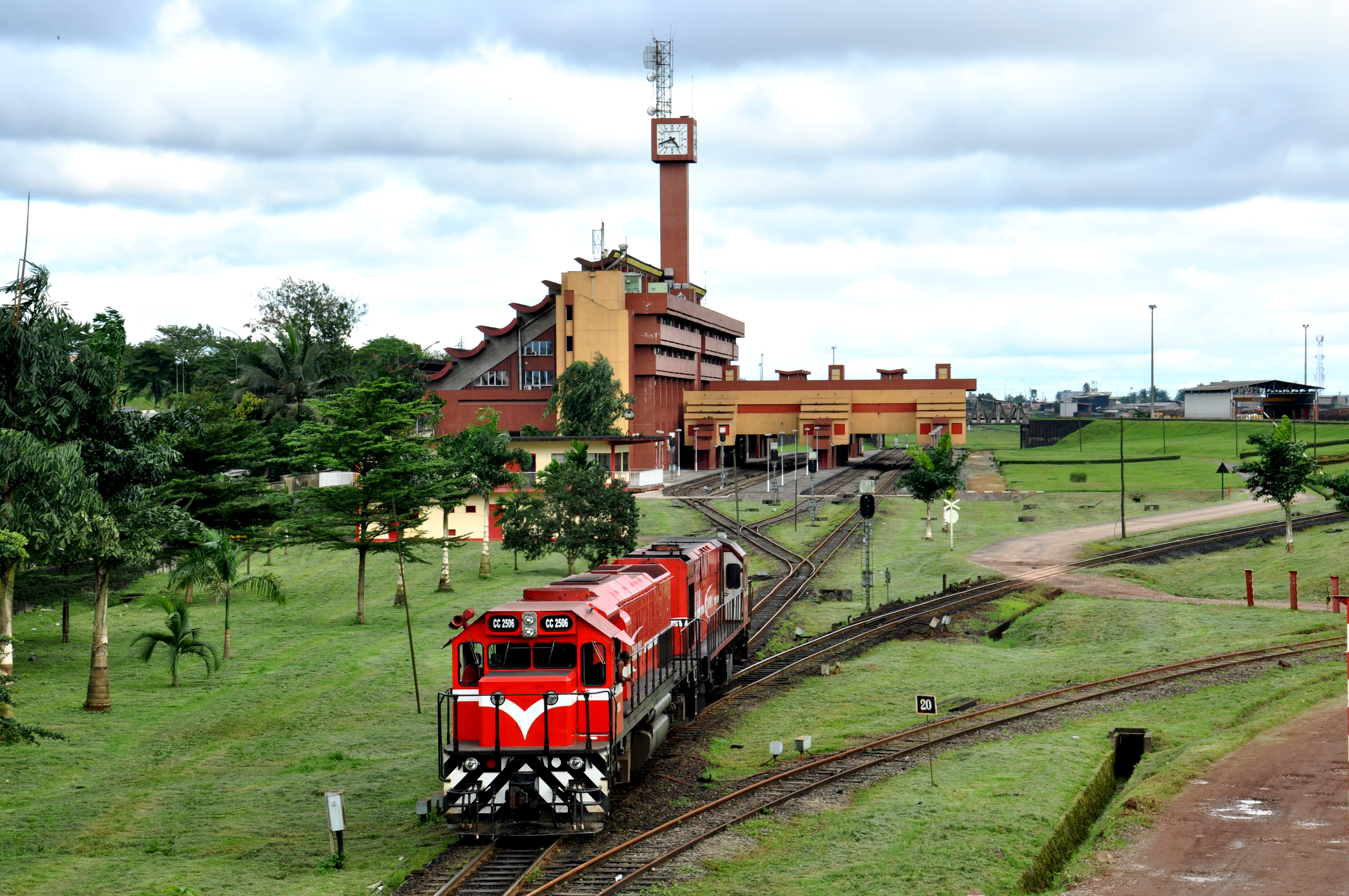
Bessengue Railway Station, Cameroon

- Railway stations in Chad
- Railway stations in Republic of the Congo
- List of railway stations in the Democratic Republic of the Congo
- Railway stations in Côte d'Ivoire
- Railway stations in Djibouti
- Railway stations in Egypt
- Railway stations in Eritrea
- Railway stations in Ethiopia
- Railway stations in Ghana
- Railway stations in Guinea
- Railway stations in Kenya
- Railway stations in Lesotho
- Railway stations in Liberia
- Railway stations in Libya
- Railway stations in Madagascar
- Railway stations in Malawi
- Railway stations in Mali
- Railway stations in Mauritania
- Railway stations in Mauritius
- Railway stations in Morocco
- Railway stations in Mozambique
- Railway stations in Namibia
- Railway stations in Nigeria
- Railway stations in Réunion
- Railway stations in Rwanda
- Railway stations in Senegal
- Railway stations in Sierra Leone
- South Africa: Passenger Rail Agency of South Africa
- Railway stations in Sudan
- Railway stations in Swaziland
- Railway stations in Tanzania
- Railway stations in Togo
- Railway stations in Tunisia
- Railway stations in Uganda
- Railway stations in Zambia
- Railway stations in Zimbabwe

== Asia ==
=== Armenia ===
- List of railway stations in Armenia

=== Bangladesh ===
- List of railway stations in Bangladesh

=== Cambodia ===
- List of railway stations in Cambodia

=== China ===
- Category:Railway stations in China
  - List of railway stations in Hong Kong

=== India ===
- List of railway stations in India

=== Indonesia ===
- List of railway stations in Indonesia

=== Iran ===
- List of railway stations in Iran

=== Japan ===
- List of railway stations in Japan

=== Kazakhstan ===
- List of railway stations in Kazakhstan

=== Malaysia ===
- Category:Railway stations in Malaysia

=== Mongolia ===
- Category:Railway stations in Mongolia

=== North Korea ===
- List of railway stations in North Korea

=== Pakistan ===
- List of railway stations in Pakistan

=== Philippines ===
- List of railway stations in the Philippines

=== Singapore ===
- Woodlands train checkpoint

=== South Korea ===
- Category:Railway stations in South Korea

=== Sri Lanka ===
- List of railway stations in Sri Lanka

=== Taiwan ===
- List of railway stations in Taiwan

=== Thailand ===
Category: Railway stations in Thailand

- List of Northern Line (Thailand) stations
- List of Northeastern Line (Thailand) stations
- List of Southern Line (Thailand) stations

=== Turkmenistan ===
- Ashgabat railway station
- Turkmenbashi railway station

== Europe ==
=== Austria ===
- Category:Railway stations in Austria

=== Azerbaijan ===
- Category:Railway stations in Azerbaijan

=== Belgium ===
- Category:Railway stations in Belgium

=== Czech Republic ===
- Category:Railway stations in the Czech Republic

=== France ===
- Category:Railway stations in France

=== Germany ===
See German railway station categories for more information.

=== Hungary ===
- Budapest
  - Eastern Railway Station (Keleti pályaudvar)
  - Western Railway Station (Nyugati pályaudvar)
  - Southern Railway Station (Déli pályaudvar)
- Miskolc
  - Tiszai Station (Tiszai pályaudvar)
  - Gömöri Station (Gömöri pályaudvar)

=== Poland ===
- List of busiest railway stations in Poland
- Category:Railway stations in Poland

=== Romania ===
- Brașov
  - Brașov railway station
- Bucharest
  - Gara de Nord
  - Basarab railway station
- Cluj-Napoca
  - Cluj-Napoca railway station
- Constanța
  - Constanţa railway station
- Craiova
  - Craiova railway station
- Iaşi
  - Iaşi railway station
- Satu Mare
  - Satu Mare railway station
- Sibiu
  - Sibiu railway station
- Sinaia
  - Sinaia railway station
- Timișoara
  - Timișoara Nord railway station

=== Russia ===
- Moscow
  - Moscow Passazhirskaya (1851)
  - Moscow Yaroslavskaya (1862, rebuilt 1904)
  - Moscow Kazanskaya (1864, rebuilt 1913–40)
  - Moscow Smolenskaya (1870, rebuilt 1909)
  - Moscow Kurskaya (1896, rebuilt 1972)
  - Moscow Savyolovskaya (1899)
  - Moscow Paveletskaya (1900)
  - Moscow Rizhskaya (1903)
  - Moscow Kiyevskaya (1912–18)
- Saint Petersburg
  - Moskovsky (1851)
  - Vitebsky (1837, rebuilt 1904)
  - Baltiysky (1857)
  - Varshavsky (1860)
  - Finland Station (1870, rebuilt 1960)
  - Ladozhsky (2003)
- Krasnodar
  - Krasnodar-1 railway station (1889)
- Samara
  - Samara railway station (1876, rebuilt 1996–2001)
- Frolovo
  - Archeda railway station

=== Spain ===
- Barcelona - List of railway stations in Barcelona
- Madrid - Atocha Railway Station
- Madrid - Chamartín Railway Station
- Sevilla - Santa Justa Railway Station
- Toledo - Toledo Railway Station
- Valencia - Norte Railway Station

=== Sweden ===
- Stockholm - Stockholm Central Station

=== Switzerland ===
- Basel
  - Basel SBB
  - Basel Badischer Bahnhof
- Bern - Bern railway station
- Geneva - Genève-Cornavin railway station
- Lausanne - Lausanne railway station
- Zürich
  - Zürich Hauptbahnhof
  - List of railway stations in Zurich

=== Ukraine ===
- Darnytsia Railway Station
- Kharkiv Railway Station
- Kyiv Passenger Railway Station
- Lviv Rail Terminal
- Odessa Railway Station
- Uzhhorod Central Rail Terminal

=== United Kingdom ===
- UK railway stations A B C D E F G H I J K L M N O P Q R S T U V W X Y Z
- List of London railway stations
- List of busiest railway stations in Great Britain
- List of closed railway stations in Britain
- List of Parkway railway stations in Britain
- Category:Lists of railway stations in Great Britain

=== Vatican City ===
- Railway Station in the Vatican City

== North America ==
- Category:Railway stations in Canada
- Category:Railway stations in the United States
- Category:Railway stations in Mexico

== Oceania ==
=== Australia ===
- Adelaide – List of Adelaide railway stations
  - Adelaide station
- Brisbane – List of Brisbane railway stations
  - Central station
  - Roma Street station
- Melbourne – List of Melbourne railway stations
  - Flinders Street station
  - Southern Cross station (formerly Spencer Street)
- Perth – List of Perth railway stations
  - Perth station
- New South Wales
  - List of Sydney Trains railway stations
  - List of NSW TrainLink railway stations
  - List of closed Sydney railway stations
- Victoria
  - List of closed regional railway stations in Victoria

=== New Zealand ===
- Auckland – List of Auckland railway stations
  - Britomart Transport Centre
- Dunedin station
- Wellington – List of Wellington railway stations

== See also ==
- List of highest railway stations in the world
- List of railway stations named after people
- Category:Lists of railway stations
