= UK railway stations – V =

Station name	Postcode links to map of station at Bing Maps	Station code links to arrivals and departures	Station code links to station information
Valley	LL65 2BT	VAL	VAL
Vauxhall	SW8 1SS	VXH	VXH
Virginia Water	GU25 4BE	VIR	VIR

== See also ==
- List of closed railway stations in Britain
- List of heritage railway stations in the United Kingdom
