= UK railway stations – R =

Station name	Postcode links to map of station at Bing Maps	Station code links to arrivals and departures	Station code links to station information
Radcliffe	NG12 1BG	RDF	RDF
Radlett	WD7 7AJ	RDT	RDT
Radley	OX14 3BJ	RAD	RAD
Radyr	CF14 2TJ	RDR	RDR
Rainford	WA11 7JX	RNF	RNF
Rainham (Essex)	RM13 9YN	RNM	RNM
Rainham (Kent)	ME8 7SG	RAI	RAI
Rainhill	L35 3TY	RNH	RNH
Ramsgate	CT11 7RE	RAM	RAM
Ramsgreave and Wilpshire	BB1 9BQ	RGW	RGW
Rannoch	PH17 2QA	RAN	RAN
Rauceby	NG34 8PT	RAU	RAU
Ravenglass for Eskdale	CA18 1SJ	RAV	RAV
Ravensbourne	BR2 0BX	RVB	RVB
Ravensthorpe	WF12 9ED	RVN	RVN
Rawcliffe	DN14 8NQ	RWC	RWC
Rayleigh	SS6 7HJ	RLG	RLG
Raynes Park	SW20 8NE	RAY	RAY
Reading	RG1 1LY	RDG	RDG
Reading Green Park	RG2 6AU	RGP	RGP
Reading West	RG30 1AS	RDW	RDW
Rectory Road	N16 7SQ	REC	REC
Redbridge	SO15 0LR	RDB	RDB
Redcar Central	TS10 1ER	RCC	RCC
Redcar East	TS10 3PF	RCE	RCE
Reddish North	SK5 6PZ	RDN	RDN
Reddish South	SK5 6TH	RDS	RDS
Redditch	B97 4RB	RDC	RDC
Redhill	RH1 1RB	RDH	RDH
Redland	BS6 6QP	RDA	RDA
Redruth	TR15 2AB	RED	RED
Reedham (Norfolk)	NR13 3EZ	REE	REE
Reedham (Surrey)	CR8 4DG	RHM	RHM
Reigate	RH2 0BD	REI	REI
Renton	G82 4ND	RTN	RTN
Reston	TD14 5JT	RSN	RSN
Retford	DN22 7TB	RET	RET
Rhiwbina	CF14 6EP	RHI	RHI
Rhoose Cardiff International Airport	CF62 3DB	RIA	RIA
Rhosneigr	LL64 5QZ	RHO	RHO
Rhyl	LL18 1AT	RHL	RHL
Rhymney	NP22 5LW	RHY	RHY
Ribblehead	LA6 3JF	RHD	RHD
Rice Lane	L9 3DD	RIL	RIL
Richmond	TW9 1DL	RMD	RMD
Rickmansworth	WD3 1QY	RIC	RIC
Riddlesdown	CR8 1HN	RDD	RDD
Ridgmont	MK43 0XR	RID	RID
Riding Mill	NE44 6EP	RDM	RDM
Risca and Pontymister	NP11 6BB	RCA	RCA
Rishton	BB1 4PH	RIS	RIS
Robertsbridge	TN32 5DJ	RBR	RBR
Robroyston	G33 1AF	RRN	RRN
Roby	L36 4HU	ROB	ROB
Rochdale	OL12 8LN	RCD	RCD
Roche	PL26 8LG	ROC	ROC
Rochester	ME1 1PA	RTR	RTR
Rochford	SS4 1AU	RFD	RFD
Rock Ferry	CH42 3YB	RFY	RFY
Rogart	IV28 3XA	ROG	ROG
Rogerstone	NP10 9LG	ROR	ROR
Rolleston	NG25 0SG	ROL	ROL
Roman Bridge	LL25 0JG	RMB	RMB
Romford	RM1 1TU	RMF	RMF
Romiley	SK6 4BP	RML	RML
Romsey	SO51 8DU	ROM	ROM
Roose	LA13 0ER	ROO	ROO
Rose Grove	BB12 6EU	RSG	RSG
Rose Hill Marple	SK6 6EE	RSH	RSH
Rosyth	KY11 2XW	ROS	ROS
Rotherham Central	S60 1QH	RMC	RMC
Rotherhithe	SE16 4LF	ROE	ROE
Roughton Road	NR27 9LN	RNR	RNR
Rowlands Castle	PO9 6BP	RLN	RLN
Rowley Regis	B65 0LJ	ROW	ROW
Roy Bridge	PH31 4AG	RYB	RYB
Roydon	CM19 5EH	RYN	RYN
Royston	SG8 5AG	RYS	RYS
Ruabon	LL14 6EA	RUA	RUA
Rufford	L40 1TB	RUF	RUF
Rugby	CV21 3LA	RUG	RUG
Rugeley Town	WS15 1BL	RGT	RGT
Rugeley Trent Valley	WS15 2HQ	RGL	RGL
Runcorn	WA7 5UB	RUN	RUN
Runcorn East	WA7 6JU	RUE	RUE
Ruskington	NG34 9ED	RKT	RKT
Ruswarp	YO21 1YL	RUS	RUS
Rutherglen	G73 1DT	RUT	RUT
Ryde Esplanade	PO33 2HE	RYD	RYD
Ryde Pier Head	PO33 2HF	RYP	RYP
Ryde St John's Road	PO33 2BA	RYR	RYR
Ryder Brow	M18 7PT	RRB	RRB
Rye	TN31 7AB	RYE	RYE
Rye House	EN11 0EW	RYH	RYH

== See also ==
- List of closed railway stations in Britain
- List of heritage railway stations in the United Kingdom
