= UK railway stations – Y =

| Station name | Postcode links to map of station at Bing Maps | Station code links to arrivals and departures | Station code links to station information |
|---|---|---|---|
| Yalding | ME18 6HN | YAL | YAL |
| Yardley Wood | B28 0RX | YRD | YRD |
| Yarm | TS15 9EQ | YRM | YRM |
| Yate | BS37 5HZ | YAE | YAE |
| Yatton | BS49 4BD | YAT | YAT |
| Yeoford | EX17 5JB | YEO | YEO |
| Yeovil Junction | BA22 9UU | YVJ | YVJ |
| Yeovil Pen Mill | BA21 5DD | YVP | YVP |
| Yetminster | DT9 6NE | YET | YET |
| Ynyswen | CF42 6EF | YNW | YNW |
| Yoker | G81 1JQ | YOK | YOK |
| York | YO24 1AB | YRK | YRK |
| York Street | BT15 1FX | | |
| Yorton | SY4 3EP | YRT | YRT |
| Ystrad Mynach | CF82 7BQ | YSM | YSM |
| Ystrad Rhondda | CF41 7RE | YSR | YSR |

== See also ==
- List of closed railway stations in Britain
- List of heritage railway stations in the United Kingdom
