= UK railway stations – U =

| Station name | Postcode links to map of station at Bing Maps | Station code links to arrivals and departures | Station code links to station information |
|---|---|---|---|
| Uckfield | TN22 5AA | UCK | UCK |
| Uddingston | G71 7LR | UDD | UDD |
| Ulceby | DN39 6TY | ULC | ULC |
| Ulleskelf | LS24 9UH | ULL | ULL |
| Ulverston | LA12 0DP | ULV | ULV |
| Umberleigh | EX37 9AA | UMB | UMB |
| University (England) | B15 2SG | UNI | UNI |
| University (Northern Ireland) | BT52 2NF | | |
| Uphall | EH54 5QE | UHA | UHA |
| Upholland | WN8 9QB | UPL | UPL |
| Upminster | RM14 2TH | UPM | UPM |
| Upper Halliford | TW17 8RL | UPH | UPH |
| Upper Holloway | N19 4DL | UHL | UHL |
| Upper Tyndrum | FK20 8RQ | UTY | UTY |
| Upper Warlingham | CR3 0EP | UWL | UWL |
| Upton | CH43 9RY | UPT | UPT |
| Upwey | DT3 5RB | UPW | UPW |
| Urmston | M41 9SG | URM | URM |
| Uttoxeter | ST14 8AX | UTT | UTT |

== See also ==
- List of closed railway stations in Britain
- List of heritage railway stations in the United Kingdom
