= UK railway stations – P =

Station name	Postcode links to map of station at Bing Maps	Station code links to arrivals and departures	Station code links to station information
Paddock Wood	TN12 6ER	PDW	PDW
Padgate	WA2 0QT	PDG	PDG
Paignton	TQ4 5EF	PGN	PGN
Paisley Canal	PA1 1YU	PCN	PCN
Paisley Gilmour Street	PA1 1BS	PYG	PYG
Paisley St James	PA3 1RQ	PYJ	PYJ
Palmers Green	N13 4QU	PAL	PAL
Pangbourne	RG8 7DY	PAN	PAN
Pannal	HG3 1JL	PNL	PNL
Pantyffynnon	SA18 3HN	PTF	PTF
Par	PL24 2LT	PAR	PAR
Parbold	WN8 7DD	PBL	PBL
Park Street	AL2 2NZ	PKT	PKT
Parkstone	BH14 8TE	PKS	PKS
Parson Street	BS3 5NG	PSN	PSN
Partick	G11 6DB	PTK	PTK
Parton	CA28 6NZ	PRN	PRN
Patchway	BS34 6HW	PWY	PWY
Patricroft	M30 0UR	PAT	PAT
Patterton	G77 6NR	PTT	PTT
Peartree	DE23 8WP	PEA	PEA
Peckham Rye	SE15 4QL	PMR	PMR
Pegswood	NE61 6SJ	PEG	PEG
Pemberton	WN5 8DE	PEM	PEM
Pembrey and Burry Port	SA16 0LP	PBY	PBY
Pembroke	SA71 4AD	PMB	PMB
Pembroke Dock	SA72 6HJ	PMD	PMD
Pen-y-Bont	LD1 6RE	PNY	PNY
Penally	SA70 7PS	PNA	PNA
Penarth	CF64 3EB	PEN	PEN
Pencoed	CF35 5NN	PCD	PCD
Pengam	NP12 3XX	PGM	PGM
Penge East	SE26 5HT	PNE	PNE
Penge West	SE20 8RZ	PNW	PNW
Penhelig	LL35 0PS	PHG	PHG
Penistone	S36 6HN	PNS	PNS
Penkridge	ST19 5AJ	PKG	PKG
Penmaenmawr	LL34 6AT	PMW	PMW
Penmere	TR11 4AE	PNM	PNM
Penrhiwceiber	CF45 3SS	PER	PER
Penrhyndeudraeth	LL48 6LL	PRH	PRH
Penrith North Lakes	CA11 7JQ	PNR	PNR
Penryn	TR10 8QW	PYN	PYN
Pensarn	LL45 2HU	PES	PES
Penshurst	TN11 8JJ	PHR	PHR
Pentre-bach	CF48 4BD	PTB	PTB
Penychain	LL53 6HJ	PNC	PNC
Penyffordd	CH4 0JT	PNF	PNF
Penzance	TR18 2DB	PNZ	PNZ
Perranwell	TR3 7LF	PRW	PRW
Perry Barr	B20 3JE	PRY	PRY
Pershore	WR10 2DJ	PSH	PSH
Perth	PH2 0DR	PTH	PTH
Peterborough	PE1 1QL	PBO	PBO
Petersfield	GU32 3EE	PTR	PTR
Petts Wood	BR5 1DH	PET	PET
Pevensey and Westham	BN24 5NB	PEV	PEV
Pevensey Bay	BN24 6AA	PEB	PEB
Pewsey	SN9 5EL	PEW	PEW
Pilning	BS35 4JH	PIL	PIL
Pineapple Road	B30 2SE	PIN	PIN
Pinhoe	EX1 3SY	PIR	PIR
Pitlochry	PH16 5BN	PIT	PIT
Pitsea	SS13 3JX	PSE	PSE
Pleasington	BB2 5JQ	PLS	PLS
Plockton	IV52 8TF	PLK	PLK
Pluckley	TN27 0RT	PLC	PLC
Plumley	WA16 9RX	PLM	PLM
Plumpton	BN7 3BW	PMP	PMP
Plumstead	SE18 7EA	PLU	PLU
Plymouth	PL4 6AB	PLY	PLY
Pokesdown	BH7 6JU	POK	POK
Polegate	BN26 5AG	PLG	PLG
Polesworth	B78 1BJ	PSW	PSW
Pollokshaws East	G43 1UB	PWE	PWE
Pollokshaws West	G43 1NZ	PWW	PWW
Pollokshields East	G41 2SX	PLE	PLE
Pollokshields West	G41 4LW	PLW	PLW
Polmont	FK2 0UF	PMT	PMT
Polsloe Bridge	EX1 2RY	POL	POL
Ponders End	EN3 4QE	PON	PON
Pont-y-Pant	LL25 0PJ	PYP	PYP
Pontarddulais	SA4 1TL	PTD	PTD
Pontefract Baghill	WF8 1RB	PFR	PFR
Pontefract Monkhill	WF8 1JA	PFM	PFM
Pontefract Tanshelf	WF8 4PJ	POT	POT
Pontlottyn	CF81 9QX	PLT	PLT
Pontyclun	CF72 9ES	PYC	PYC
Pontypool and New Inn	NP4 0RE	PPL	PPL
Pontypridd	CF37 1LJ	PPD	PPD
Poole	BH15 1YL	POO	POO
Poppleton	YO26 6QA	POP	POP
Portway Park & Ride	BS11 9DE	PRI	PRI
Port Glasgow	PA14 5JN	PTG	PTG
Port Sunlight	CH62 4XB	PSL	PSL
Port Talbot Parkway	SA13 1SA	PTA	PTA
Portadown	BT62 1JJ		
Portchester	PO16 8PE	PTC	PTC
Porth	CF39 9NY	POR	POR
Porthmadog	LL49 9ND	PTM	PTM
Portlethen	AB12 4PT	PLN	PLN
Portrush	BT56 8DJ		
Portslade	BN3 7HD	PLD	PLD
Portsmouth & Southsea	PO1 1EQ	PMS	PMS
Portsmouth Arms	EX37 9ND	PMA	PMA
Portsmouth Harbour	PO1 3EU	PMH	PMH
Possilpark and Parkhouse	G22 6LW	PPK	PPK
Potters Bar	EN6 1AU	PBR	PBR
Poulton-le-Fylde	FY6 7BD	PFY	PFY
Poynton	SK12 1GA	PYT	PYT
Poyntzpass	BT35 6SN		
Prees	SY13 2DW	PRS	PRS
Prescot	L34 5SY	PSC	PSC
Prestatyn	LL19 9AF	PRT	PRT
Prestbury	SK10 4HT	PRB	PRB
Preston	PR1 8AP	PRE	PRE
Preston Park	BN1 6SF	PRP	PRP
Prestonpans	EH32 9ES	PST	PST
Prestwick International Airport	KA9 2PJ	PRA	PRA
Prestwick Town	KA9 1HQ	PTW	PTW
Priesthill & Darnley	G53 6UL	PTL	PTL
Princes Risborough	HP27 9DD	PRR	PRR
Prittlewell	SS2 6LG	PRL	PRL
Prudhoe	NE42 6NR	PRU	PRU
Pulborough	RH20 1AX	PUL	PUL
Purfleet	RM19 1QS	PFL	PFL
Purley	CR8 2AP	PUR	PUR
Purley Oaks	CR2 0QA	PUO	PUO
Putney	SW15 1TE	PUT	PUT
Pwllheli	LL53 5HL	PWL	PWL
Pye Corner	NP10 9DS	PYE	PYE
Pyle	CF33 4NL	PYL	PYL

== See also ==
- List of closed railway stations in Britain
- List of heritage railway stations in the United Kingdom
