= UK railway stations – W =

Station name	Postcode links to map of station at Bing Maps	Station code links to arrivals and departures	Station code links to station information
Waddon	CR0 4UP	WDO	WDO
Wadhurst	TN5 6RZ	WAD	WAD
Wainfleet	PE24 4LJ	WFL	WFL
Wakefield Kirkgate	WF1 4EL	WKK	WKK
Wakefield Westgate	WF1 2TD	WKF	WKF
Walkden	M28 3DY	WKD	WKD
Wallasey Grove Road	CH45 8JY	WLG	WLG
Wallasey Village	CH45 8PZ	WLV	WLV
Wallington	SM6 0DY	WLT	WLT
Wallyford	EH21 8AA	WAF	WAF
Walmer	CT14 7RN	WAM	WAM
Walsall	WS1 1NH	WSL	WSL
Walsden	OL14 6RR	WDN	WDN
Waltham Cross	EN8 7LU	WLC	WLC
Walthamstow Central	E17 7LS	WHC	WHC
Walthamstow Queens Road	E17 7QJ	WMW	WMW
Walton (Merseyside)	L9 1EX	WAO	WAO
Walton-on-the-Naze	CO14 8DH	WON	WON
Walton-on-Thames	KT12 1NR	WAL	WAL
Wanborough	GU3 2EX	WAN	WAN
Wandsworth Common	SW12 8PB	WSW	WSW
Wandsworth Road	SW8 4PA	WWR	WWR
Wandsworth Town	SW18 1SU	WNT	WNT
Wanstead Park	E7 0HX	WNP	WNP
Wapping	E1W 3PA	WPE	WPE
Warblington	PO9 2QH	WBL	WBL
Ware	SG12 9UT	WAR	WAR
Wareham	BH20 4BG	WRM	WRM
Wargrave	RG10 8EX	WGV	WGV
Warminster	BA12 9BP	WMN	WMN
Warnham	RH12 3SR	WNH	WNH
Warrington Bank Quay	WA1 1LS	WBQ	WBQ
Warrington Central	WA1 2AE	WAC	WAC
Warrington West	WA5 8SA	WAW	WAW
Warwick	CV34 4LA	WRW	WRW
Warwick Parkway	CV35 8QN	WRP	WRP
Water Orton	B46 1NG	WTO	WTO
Waterbeach	CB5 9PP	WBC	WBC
Wateringbury	ME18 5EA	WTR	WTR
Waterloo (Merseyside)	L22 0LY	WLO	WLO
Watford High Street	WD17 2NU	WFH	WFH
Watford Junction	WD17 1EU	WFJ	WFJ
Watford North	WD24 7DS	WFN	WFN
Watlington	PE33 0TQ	WTG	WTG
Watton-at-Stone	SG14 3HF	WAS	WAS
Waun-gron Park	CF5 2BN	WNG	WNG
Wavertree Technology Park	L15 4PW	WAV	WAV
Weeley	CO16 9HY	WEE	WEE
Weeton	LS17 0EQ	WET	WET
Welham Green	AL9 7HF	WMG	WMG
Welling	DA16 3JA	WLI	WLI
Wellingborough	NN8 1NQ	WEL	WEL
Wellington	TF1 1BY	WLN	WLN
Welshpool	SY21 7AY	WLP	WLP
Welwyn Garden City	AL8 6BE	WGC	WGC
Welwyn North	AL6 0EA	WLW	WLW
Wem	SY4 5AZ	WEM	WEM
Wembley Central	HA9 7AJ	WMB	WMB
Wembley Stadium	HA9 6NY	WCX	WCX
Wemyss Bay	PA18 6AR	WMS	WMS
Wendover	HP22 6BT	WND	WND
Wennington	LA2 8PB	WNN	WNN
West Allerton	L19 7NL	WSA	WSA
West Brompton	SW6 1RT	WBP	WBP
West Byfleet	KT14 6PA	WBY	WBY
West Calder	EH55 8BQ	WCL	WCL
West Croydon	CR0 2RD	WCY	WCY
West Drayton	UB7 9DZ	WDT	WDT
West Dulwich	SE21 8HN	WDU	WDU
West Ealing	W13 0LJ	WEA	WEA
West Ham	E15 3BW	WEH	WEH
West Hampstead	NW6 2LJ	WHD	WHD
West Hampstead Thameslink	NW6 1PF	WHP	WHP
West Horndon	CM13 3TL	WHR	WHR
West Kilbride	KA23 9DD	WKB	WKB
West Kirby	CH48 4DZ	WKI	WKI
West Malling	ME19 6HJ	WMA	WMA
West Norwood	SE27 0DW	WNW	WNW
West Ruislip	HA4 7DW	WRU	WRU
West Runton	NR27 9QJ	WRN	WRN
West St Leonards	TN38 0AB	WLD	WLD
West Sutton	SM1 2HJ	WSU	WSU
West Wickham	BR4 0EH	WWI	WWI
West Worthing	BN11 4SR	WWO	WWO
Westbury	BA13 4HP	WSB	WSB
Westcliff-on-Sea	SS0 7SB	WCF	WCF
Westcombe Park	SE3 7EQ	WCB	WCB
Westenhanger	TN25 6DE	WHA	WHA
Wester Hailes	EH14 3HR	WTA	WTA
Westerfield	IP6 9AE	WFI	WFI
Westerton	G61 1PB	WES	WES
Westgate-on-Sea	CT8 8RA	WGA	WGA
Westhoughton	BL5 3QT	WHG	WHG
Weston Milton	BS22 8PF	WNM	WNM
Weston-super-Mare	BS23 1YB	WSM	WSM
Wetheral	CA4 8JP	WRL	WRL
Weybridge	KT13 8UF	WYB	WYB
Weymouth	DT4 7BN	WEY	WEY
Whaley Bridge	SK23 7AF	WBR	WBR
Whalley	BB7 9RT	WHE	WHE
Whatstandwell	DE4 5EE	WTS	WTS
Whifflet	ML5 4EE	WFF	WFF
Whimple	EX5 2QJ	WHM	WHM
Whinhill	PA15 3LA	WNL	WNL
Whiston	L35 3TY	WHN	WHN
Whitby	YO21 1YN	WTB	WTB
Whitchurch (Cardiff)	CF14 1BP	WHT	WHT
Whitchurch (Hampshire)	RG28 7BZ	WCH	WCH
Whitchurch (Shropshire)	SY13 1RL	WTC	WTC
White Hart Lane	N17 8HH	WHL	WHL
White Notley	CM8 1RP	WNY	WNY
Whiteabbey	BT37 0BP		
Whitechapel	E1 1BY	ZLW	ZLW
Whitecraigs	G46 6SA	WCR	WCR
Whitehaven	CA28 6AX	WTH	WTH
Whitehead	BT38 9QF		
Whitland	SA34 0AP	WTL	WTL
Whitley Bridge	DN14 0HH	WBD	WBD
Whitlocks End	B90 1EA	WTE	WTE
Whitstable	CT5 1QS	WHI	WHI
Whittlesea	PE7 2EU	WLE	WLE
Whittlesford Parkway	CB2 4PL	WLF	WLF
Whitton	TW2 7JX	WTN	WTN
Whitwell	S80 4TA	WWL	WWL
Whyteleafe	CR3 0AD	WHY	WHY
Whyteleafe South	CR3 0BF	WHS	WHS
Wick	KW1 5LB	WCK	WCK
Wickford	SS11 7AT	WIC	WIC
Wickham Market	IP13 0PR	WCM	WCM
Widdrington	NE61 5QH	WDD	WDD
Widnes	WA8 7TL	WID	WID
Widney Manor	B91 3JW	WMR	WMR
Wigan North Western	WN3 4HU	WGN	WGN
Wigan Wallgate	WN1 1LP	WGW	WGW
Wigton	CA7 9BA	WGT	WGT
Wildmill	CF31 1YY	WMI	WMI
Willenhall	WV13 2AW	WIA	WIA
Willesden Junction	NW10 4RA	WIJ	WIJ
Williamwood	G76 7NP	WLM	WLM
Willington	DE65 6BP	WIL	WIL
Wilmcote	CV37 9UQ	WMC	WMC
Wilmslow	SK9 1BB	WML	WML
Wilnecote	B77 5AY	WNE	WNE
Wimbledon	SW19 7NL	WIM	WIM
Wimbledon Chase	SW20 8JT	WBO	WBO
Winchelsea	TN36 4JX	WSE	WSE
Winchester	SO22 6RF	WIN	WIN
Winchfield	RG27 8BX	WNF	WNF
Winchmore Hill	N21 1BS	WIH	WIH
Windermere	LA23 1QA	WDM	WDM
Windsor and Eton Central	SL4 1PJ	WNC	WNC
Windsor and Eton Riverside	SL4 1NA	WNR	WNR
Winnersh	RG41 5NA	WNS	WNS
Winnersh Triangle	RG41 5TQ	WTI	WTI
Winsford	CW7 3PB	WSF	WSF
Wishaw	ML2 0EX	WSH	WSH
Witham	CM8 2DW	WTM	WTM
Witley	GU8 5TD	WTY	WTY
Witton	B6 6QU	WTT	WTT
Wivelsfield	RH15 0PX	WVF	WVF
Wivenhoe	CO7 9DJ	WIV	WIV
Woburn Sands	MK17 8SG	WOB	WOB
Woking	GU22 7AE	WOK	WOK
Wokingham	RG40 2AP	WKM	WKM
Woldingham	CR3 7LQ	WOH	WOH
Wolverhampton	WV1 1LE	WVH	WVH
Wolverton	MK12 5TR	WOL	WOL
Wombwell	S73 0LU	WOM	WOM
Wood End	B94 5ED	WDE	WDE
Wood Street	E17 3LX	WST	WST
Woodbridge	IP12 4AJ	WDB	WDB
Woodgrange Park	E12 6UL	WGR	WGR
Woodhall	PA14 6QX	WDL	WDL
Woodhouse	S13 9WQ	WDH	WDH
Woodlesford	LS26 8RA	WDS	WDS
Woodley	SK6 1NT	WLY	WLY
Woodmansterne	CR5 3HS	WME	WME
Woodsmoor	SK2 7DN	WSR	WSR
Wool	BH20 6BL	WOO	WOO
Woolston	SO19 7DD	WLS	WLS
Woolwich	SE18 6GD	WWC	WWC
Woolwich Arsenal	SE18 6AR	WWA	WWA
Woolwich Dockyard	SE18 5JY	WWD	WWD
Wootton Wawen	B95 6BG	WWW	WWW
Worcester Foregate Street	WR1 1XX	WOF	WOF
Worcester Park	KT4 7NB	WCP	WCP
Worcester Shrub Hill	WR4 9EJ	WOS	WOS
Worcestershire Parkway	WR5 2DQ	WOP	WOP
Workington	CA14 2XF	WKG	WKG
Worksop	S81 7AG	WRK	WRK
Worle	BS22 6BW	WOR	WOR
Worplesdon	GU22 0SP	WPL	WPL
Worstead	NR28 9RY	WRT	WRT
Worthing	BN11 1UR	WRH	WRH
Wrabness	CO11 2TJ	WRB	WRB
Wraysbury	TW19 5NJ	WRY	WRY
Wrenbury	CW5 8EX	WRE	WRE
Wressle	YO8 6ER	WRS	WRS
Wrexham Central	LL11 1SP	WXC	WXC
Wrexham General	LL11 2AA	WRX	WRX
Wye	TN25 5HB	WYE	WYE
Wylam	NE41 8HR	WYM	WYM
Wylde Green	B73 5NX	WYL	WYL
Wymondham	NR18 0JZ	WMD	WMD
Wythall	B47 6HE	WYT	WYT

== See also ==
- List of closed railway stations in Britain
- List of heritage railway stations in the United Kingdom
