= UK railway stations – Q =

Station name	Postcode links to map of station at Bing Maps	Station code links to arrivals and departures	Station code links to station information
Quakers Yard	CF46 5NJ	QYD	QYD
Queenborough	ME11 5AZ	QBR	QBR
Queen's Park (Glasgow)	G42 8PH	QPK	QPK
Queen's Park (London)	NW6 6NL	QPW	QPW
Queens Road (Peckham)	SE15 2JN	QRP	QRP
Queenstown Road	SW11 5EZ	QRB	QRB
Quintrell Downs	TR8 4QG	QUI	QUI

== See also ==
- List of closed railway stations in Britain
- List of heritage railway stations in the United Kingdom
