= UK railway stations – O =

| Station name | Postcode links to map of station at Bing Maps | Station code links to arrivals and departures | Station code links to station information |
|---|---|---|---|
| Oakengates | TF2 6DT | OKN | OKN |
| Oakham | LE15 6RE | OKM | OKM |
| Oakleigh Park | EN4 8DR | OKL | OKL |
| Oban | PA34 4NU | OBN | OBN |
| Ockendon | RM15 6PD | OCK | OCK |
| Ockley | RH5 5HT | OLY | OLY |
| Okehampton | EX20 1EJ | OKE | OKE |
| Okehampton Interchange | EX20 1QQ | OKI | OKI |
| Old Hill | B64 6PL | OHL | OHL |
| Old Roan | L10 3JG | ORN | ORN |
| Old Street | EC1V 9NR | OLD | OLD |
| Oldfield Park | BA2 3RN | OLF | OLF |
| Olton | B92 8BS | OLT | OLT |
| Ore | TN34 3SN | ORE | ORE |
| Ormskirk | L39 2YN | OMS | OMS |
| Orpington | BR6 0SX | ORP | ORP |
| Orrell | WN5 8TH | ORR | ORR |
| Orrell Park | L9 8BU | OPK | OPK |
| Otford | TN14 5QY | OTF | OTF |
| Oulton Broad North | NR32 3LJ | OUN | OUN |
| Oulton Broad South | NR33 8QX | OUS | OUS |
| Outwood | WF3 3HR | OUT | OUT |
| Overpool | CH66 3NP | OVE | OVE |
| Overton | RG25 3JJ | OVR | OVR |
| Oxenholme Lake District | LA9 7HF | OXN | OXN |
| Oxford | OX1 1HS | OXF | OXF |
| Oxford Parkway | OX2 8HA | OXP | OXP |
| Oxshott | KT22 0TA | OXS | OXS |
| Oxted | RH8 0QD | OXT | OXT |

== See also ==
- List of closed railway stations in Britain
- List of heritage railway stations in the United Kingdom
