= UK railway stations – N =

Station name	Postcode links to map of station at Bing Maps	Station code links to arrivals and departures	Station code links to station information
Nafferton	YO25 4LU	NFN	NFN
Nailsea and Backwell	BS48 3LE	NLS	NLS
Nairn	IV12 4QP	NRN	NRN
Nantwich	CW5 7BG	NAN	NAN
Narberth	SA67 8TY	NAR	NAR
Narborough	LE9 5HR	NBR	NBR
Navigation Road	WA15 6RJ	NVR	NVR
Neath	SA11 1BY	NTH	NTH
Needham Market	IP6 8AS	NMT	NMT
Neilston	G78 3DY	NEI	NEI
Nelson	BB9 9AW	NEL	NEL
Neston	CH64 3RG	NES	NES
Netherfield	NG4 2FP	NET	NET
Nethertown	CA22 2UQ	NRT	NRT
Netley	SO31 5AX	NTL	NTL
New Barnet	EN5 1LW	NBA	NBA
New Beckenham	BR3 1QJ	NBC	NBC
New Brighton	CH45 2NY	NBN	NBN
New Clee	DN31 3AE	NCE	NCE
New Cross	SE14 6LL	NWX	NWX
New Cross Gate	SE14 6BL	NXG	NXG
New Cumnock	KA18 4DF	NCK	NCK
New Eltham	SE9 2AA	NEH	NEH
New Holland	DN19 7RU	NHL	NHL
New Hythe	ME20 6XS	NHE	NHE
New Lane	L40 0RP	NLN	NLN
New Malden	KT3 4JQ	NEM	NEM
New Mills Central	SK22 3FB	NMC	NMC
New Mills Newtown	SK22 3JW	NMN	NMN
New Milton	BH25 6JS	NWM	NWM
New Pudsey	LS28 6QG	NPD	NPD
New Southgate	N11 1QH	NSG	NSG
Newark Castle	NG24 1BW	NCT	NCT
Newark North Gate	NG24 1LP	NNG	NNG
Newbridge	NP11 5FH	NBE	NBE
Newbury	RG14 7LP	NBY	NBY
Newbury Racecourse	RG14 5UT	NRC	NRC
Newcastle	NE1 5DL	NCL	NCL
Newcourt	EX2 7AS	NCO	NCO
Newcraighall	EH21 8SG	NEW	NEW
Newhaven Harbour	BN9 0BB	NVH	NVH
Newhaven Town	BN9 0AS	NVN	NVN
Newington	ME9 7LQ	NGT	NGT
Newmarket	CB8 9WT	NMK	NMK
Newport (Essex)	CB11 3RN	NWE	NWE
Newport (Wales)	NP20 4AA	NWP	NWP
Newquay	TR7 1SE	NQY	NQY
Newry	BT35 6JW		
Newsham	NE24 3QJ	NWH	NWH
Newstead	NG17 9AQ	NSD	NSD
Newton	G72 7TD	NTN	NTN
Newton Abbot	TQ12 2BT	NTA	NTA
Newton Aycliffe	DL5 7BD	NAY	NAY
Newton for Hyde	SK14 4AE	NWN	NWN
Newton-on-Ayr	KA8 8LL	NOA	NOA
Newton St Cyres	EX5 5AS	NTC	NTC
Newton-le-Willows	WA12 9SF	NLW	NLW
Newtongrange	EH22 4PE	NEG	NEG
Newtonmore	PH20 1AL	NWR	NWR
Newtown	SY16 1BE	NWT	NWT
Ninian Park	CF11 8AH	NNP	NNP
Nitshill	G53 7NX	NIT	NIT
Norbiton	KT1 3QT	NBT	NBT
Norbury	SW16 4BU	NRB	NRB
Normans Bay	BN24 6PR	NSB	NSB
Normanton	WF6 2BP	NOR	NOR
North Berwick	EH39 4DA	NBW	NBW
North Camp	GU12 5QA	NCM	NCM
North Dulwich	SE22 8TB	NDL	NDL
North Fambridge	CM3 6NE	NFA	NFA
North Llanrwst	LL26 0EG	NLR	NLR
North Queensferry	KY11 1JH	NQU	NQU
North Road	DL3 6ST	NRD	NRD
North Sheen	TW9 4QQ	NSH	NSH
North Walsham	NR28 0DT	NWA	NWA
North Wembley	HA9 7NT	NWB	NWB
Northallerton	DL7 8DE	NTR	NTR
Northampton	NN1 1SP	NMP	NMP
Northfield	B31 3UB	NFD	NFD
Northfleet	DA11 9DY	NFL	NFL
Northolt Park	UB5 4PB	NLT	NLT
Northumberland Park (London)	N17 0UQ	NUM	NUM
Northumberland Park (Tyne and Wear)	NE27 0RL	NOP	NOP
Northwich	CW9 7FF	NWI	NWI
Norwich	NR1 1EF	NRW	NRW
Norwood Junction	SE25 5AQ	NWD	NWD
Nottingham	NG2 3AQ	NOT	NOT
Nuneaton	CV11 4BU	NUN	NUN
Nunhead	SE15 3XD	NHD	NHD
Nunthorpe	TS7 0BL	NNT	NNT
Nutbourne	PO18 8SJ	NUT	NUT
Nutfield	RH1 5RR	NUF	NUF

== See also ==
- List of closed railway stations in Britain
- List of heritage railway stations in the United Kingdom
