= UK railway stations – T =

Station name	Postcode links to map of station at Bing Maps	Station code links to arrivals and departures	Station code links to station information
Tackley	OX5 3AT	TAC	TAC
Tadworth	KT20 5SP	TAD	TAD
Taffs Well	CF15 7PE	TAF	TAF
Tain	IV19 1JA	TAI	TAI
Tal-y-Cafn	LL28 5RR	TLC	TLC
Talsarnau	LL47 6UA	TAL	TAL
Talybont	LL43 2AR	TLB	TLB
Tame Bridge Parkway	B71 3NP	TAB	TAB
Tamworth	B79 7JT	TAM	TAM
Taplow	SL6 0NT	TAP	TAP
Tattenham Corner	KT18 5QD	TAT	TAT
Taunton	TA1 1QP	TAU	TAU
Taynuilt	PA35 1JN	TAY	TAY
Teddington	TW11 0AZ	TED	TED
Teesside Airport	DL2 1NX	TEA	TEA
Teignmouth	TQ14 8PG	TGM	TGM
Telford Central	TF3 4LZ	TFC	TFC
Templecombe	BA8 0JR	TMC	TMC
Tenby	SA70 7LZ	TEN	TEN
Teynham	ME9 9EA	TEY	TEY
Thames Ditton	KT7 0PD	THD	THD
Thanet Parkway	CT12 5LQ	THP	THP
Thatcham	RG19 4NU	THA	THA
Thatto Heath	WA9 5NY	THH	THH
The Hawthorns	B71 4LW	THW	THW
The Lakes	B94 5SE	TLK	TLK
Theale	RG7 4AG	THE	THE
Theobalds Grove	EN8 7BG	TEO	TEO
Thetford	IP24 1AS	TTF	TTF
Thirsk	YO7 4LT	THI	THI
Thornaby	TS17 6AN	TBY	TBY
Thorne North	DN8 4HZ	TNN	TNN
Thorne South	DN8 5PA	TNS	TNS
Thornford	DT9 6HE	THO	THO
Thornliebank	G46 7RJ	THB	THB
Thornton Abbey	DN39 6UX	TNA	TNA
Thornton Heath	CR7 8RX	TTH	TTH
Thorntonhall	G74 5QA	THT	THT
Thorpe Bay	SS1 3QH	TPB	TPB
Thorpe Culvert	PE24 4NL	TPC	TPC
Thorpe-le-Soken	CO16 0HJ	TLS	TLS
Three Bridges	RH10 7AZ	TBD	TBD
Three Oaks	TN35 4PN	TOK	TOK
Thurgarton	NG14 7HD	THU	THU
Thurnscoe	S63 0JR	THC	THC
Thurso	KW14 7DL	THS	THS
Thurston	IP31 3NZ	TRS	TRS
Tilbury Town	RM18 7JT	TIL	TIL
Tile Hill	CV4 8AR	THL	THL
Tilehurst	RG31 6TQ	TLH	TLH
Tipton	DY4 9BP	TIP	TIP
Tir-Phil	NP24 6EL	TIR	TIR
Tisbury	SP3 6JT	TIS	TIS
Titanic Quarter	BT4 1BP		
Tiverton Parkway	EX16 7HD	TVP	TVP
Todmorden	OL14 7AP	TOD	TOD
Tolworth	KT5 9NX	TOL	TOL
Ton Pentre	CF41 7PN	TPN	TPN
Tonbridge	TN9 1TX	TON	TON
Tondu	CF34 9HS	TDU	TDU
Tonfanau	LL36 9LP	TNF	TNF
Tonypandy	CF40 2NP	TNP	TNP
Tooting	CR4 2BX	TOO	TOO
Topsham	EX3 0DS	TOP	TOP
Torquay	TQ2 6NU	TQY	TQY
Torre	TQ2 5DD	TRR	TRR
Totnes	TQ9 6LS	TOT	TOT
Tottenham Court Road	W1D 2DH	TCR	TCR
Tottenham Hale	N17 9LJ	TOM	TOM
Totton	SO40 3AD	TTN	TTN
Town Green	L39 6RH	TWN	TWN
Trafford Park	M32 0NX	TRA	TRA
Treforest	CF37 1SY	TRF	TRF
Treforest Estate	CF38 1SG	TRE	TRE
Trehafod	CF37 2LL	TRH	TRH
Treherbert	CF42 5JJ	TRB	TRB
Treorchy	CF42 6UE	TRY	TRY
Trimley	IP11 0UB	TRM	TRM
Tring	HP23 5QP	TRI	TRI
Troed-y-rhiw	CF48 4DY	TRD	TRD
Troon	KA10 6JY	TRN	TRN
Trooperslane	BT38 8PD		
Trowbridge	BA14 8HW	TRO	TRO
Truro	TR1 3HH	TRU	TRU
Tulloch	PH31 4AR	TUL	TUL
Tulse Hill	SE27 9BW	TUH	TUH
Tunbridge Wells	TN1 1GE	TBW	TBW
Turkey Street	EN1 4QG	TUR	TUR
Tutbury and Hatton	DE65 5DY	TUT	TUT
Tweedbank	TD1 3SP	TWB	TWB
Twickenham	TW1 3JB	TWI	TWI
Twyford	RG10 9NA	TWY	TWY
Ty Croes	LL63 5HX	TYC	TYC
Ty Glas	CF14 5DL	TGS	TGS
Tygwyn	LL47 6TF	TYG	TYG
Tyndrum Lower	FK20 8RZ	TYL	TYL
Tyseley	B11 2HH	TYS	TYS
Tywyn	LL36 9EY	TYW	TYW

== See also ==
- List of closed railway stations in Britain
- List of heritage railway stations in the United Kingdom
