= UK railway stations – M =

Station name	Postcode links to map of station at Bing Maps	Station code links to arrivals and departures	Station code links to station information
Macclesfield	SK10 1JD	MAC	MAC
Machynlleth	SY20 8TG	MCN	MCN
Maesteg	CF34 9BN	MST	MST
Maesteg (Ewenny Road)	CF34 9TS	MEW	MEW
Magheramorne	BT40 3HW		
Maghull	L31 3DE	MAG	MAG
Maghull North	L31 1BB	MNS	MNS
Maiden Newton	DT2 0BP	MDN	MDN
Maidenhead	SL6 1EW	MAI	MAI
Maidstone Barracks	ME16 0SQ	MDB	MDB
Maidstone East	ME14 1QL	MDE	MDE
Maidstone West	ME16 8RJ	MDW	MDW
Malden Manor	KT3 5PN	MAL	MAL
Mallaig	PH41 4QA	MLG	MLG
Malton	YO17 9RD	MLT	MLT
Malvern Link	WR14 1JE	MVL	MVL
Manchester Airport	M90 3RR	MIA	MIA
Manchester Oxford Road	M1 6FU	MCO	MCO
Manchester Piccadilly	M1 2PZ	MAN	MAN
Manchester Victoria	M3 1AR	MCV	MCV
Manea	PE15 0HQ	MNE	MNE
Manningtree	CO11 2LH	MNG	MNG
Manor Park	E12 5DA	MNP	MNP
Manor Road	CH47 3DS	MNR	MNR
Manorbier	SA70 7SN	MRB	MRB
Manors	NE1 2HQ	MAS	MAS
Mansfield	NG18 1LP	MFT	MFT
Mansfield Woodhouse	NG19 9NW	MSW	MSW
March	PE15 8SL	MCH	MCH
Marden	TN12 9HS	MRN	MRN
Margate	CT9 5AD	MAR	MAR
Marino	BT18 0AH		
Market Harborough	LE16 7QE	MHR	MHR
Market Rasen	LN8 3AW	MKR	MKR
Markinch	KY7 6AQ	MNC	MNC
Marks Tey	CO6 1ED	MKT	MKT
Marlow	SL7 1NT	MLW	MLW
Marple	SK6 7DA	MPL	MPL
Marsden	HD7 6AX	MSN	MSN
Marsh Barton	EX2 8QE	MBT	MBT
Marske	TS11 6JH	MSK	MSK
Marston Green	B37 7AF	MGN	MGN
Martin Mill	CT15 5LD	MTM	MTM
Martins Heron	RG12 9YY	MAO	MAO
Marton	TS3 0SR	MTO	MTO
Maryhill	G20 0BT	MYH	MYH
Maryland	E15 1EY	MYL	MYL
Maryport	CA15 6NQ	MRY	MRY
Matlock	DE4 3NA	MAT	MAT
Matlock Bath	DE4 3NT	MTB	MTB
Mauldeth Road	M14 6SE	MAU	MAU
Maxwell Park	G41 4LG	MAX	MAX
Maybole	KA19 8AF	MAY	MAY
Maze Hill	SE10 9XR	MZH	MZH
Meadowhall Interchange	S4 7YU	MHS	MHS
Meldreth	SG8 6JU	MEL	MEL
Melksham	SN12 8DB	MKM	MKM
Melton	IP12 1LT	MES	MES
Melton Mowbray	LE13 1AW	MMO	MMO
Menheniot	PL14 3UF	MEN	MEN
Menston	LS29 6QG	MNN	MNN
Meols	CH47 8XZ	MEO	MEO
Meols Cop	PR9 7DD	MEC	MEC
Meopham	DA13 0LX	MEP	MEP
Meridian Water	N18 3HF	MRW	MRW
Merryton	ML9 2UW	MEY	MEY
Merstham	RH1 3AP	MHM	MHM
Merthyr Tydfil	CF47 8DH	MER	MER
Merthyr Vale	CF48 4TE	MEV	MEV
Metheringham	LN4 3HD	MGM	MGM
MetroCentre	NE11 9XG	MCE	MCE
Mexborough	S64 9AQ	MEX	MEX
Micheldever	SO21 3AW	MIC	MIC
Micklefield	LS25 4DQ	MIK	MIK
Middlesbrough	TS1 1DR	MBR	MBR
Middlewood	SK12 1UA	MDL	MDL
Midgham	RG7 5SJ	MDG	MDG
Milford	GU8 5AD	MLF	MLF
Milford Haven	SA73 3AU	MFH	MFH
Mill Hill	BB2 4BY	MLH	MLH
Mill Hill Broadway	NW7 2JU	MIL	MIL
Millbrook (Bedfordshire)	MK45 2JH	MLB	MLB
Millbrook (Hampshire)	SO15 3SE	MBK	MBK
Milliken Park	PA10 2DA	MIN	MIN
Millom	LA18 5AA	MLM	MLM
Mills Hill	M24 2EH	MIH	MIH
Milngavie	G62 6NB	MLN	MLN
Milton Keynes Central	MK9 1DB	MKC	MKC
Minffordd	LL48 6HF	MFF	MFF
Minster	CT12 4BW	MSR	MSR
Mirfield	WF14 8PT	MIR	MIR
Mistley	CO11 1HG	MIS	MIS
Mitcham Eastfields	CR4 2LS	MTC	MTC
Mitcham Junction	CR4 4HN	MIJ	MIJ
Mobberley	WA16 7QJ	MOB	MOB
Moira	BT67 0NE		
Monifieth	DD5 4NG	MON	MON
Monks Risborough	HP27 9JQ	MRS	MRS
Montpelier	BS6 5HA	MTP	MTP
Montrose	DD10 8DE	MTS	MTS
Moorfields	L2 2BL	MRF	MRF
Moorgate	EC2Y 9AE	MOG	MOG
Moorside	M27 9RJ	MSD	MSD
Moorthorpe	WF9 3AT	MRP	MRP
Morar	PH40 4PB	MRR	MRR
Morchard Road	EX17 5LR	MRD	MRD
Morden South	SM4 5HA	MDS	MDS
Morecambe	LA4 4DW	MCM	MCM
Moreton (Dorset)	DT2 8BD	MTN	MTN
Moreton (Merseyside)	CH46 6AA	MRT	MRT
Moreton-in-Marsh	GL56 0JR	MIM	MIM
Morfa Mawddach	LL39 1BQ	MFA	MFA
Morley	LS27 8LJ	MLY	MLY
Morpeth	NE61 2SW	MPT	MPT
Mortimer	RG7 3NY	MOR	MOR
Mortlake	SW14 8LL	MTL	MTL
Moseley Village	B13 8JG	MOV	MOV
Moses Gate	BL3 2QH	MSS	MSS
Moss Side	FY8 4NB	MOS	MOS
Mossley	OL5 0AB	MSL	MSL
Mossley Hill	L18 8EE	MSH	MSH
Mossley West	BT36 5NN		
Mosspark	G52 3EX	MPK	MPK
Moston	M40 5AA	MSO	MSO
Motherwell	ML1 3JA	MTH	MTH
Motspur Park	KT3 6QS	MOT	MOT
Mottingham	SE9 4EN	MTG	MTG
Mottisfont & Dunbridge	SO51 0RA	DBG	DBG
Mouldsworth	CH3 8AJ	MLD	MLD
Moulsecoomb	BN2 4GP	MCB	MCB
Mount Florida	G42 9DN	MFL	MFL
Mount Vernon	G32 9RD	MTV	MTV
Mountain Ash	CF45 3HD	MTA	MTA
Muir of Ord	IV6 7TJ	MOO	MOO
Muirend	G44 3ES	MUI	MUI
Musselburgh	EH21 6TR	MUB	MUB
Mytholmroyd	HX7 5DU	MYT	MYT

== See also ==
- List of heritage railway stations in the United Kingdom
