= UK railway stations – G =

Station name	Postcode links to map of station at Bing Maps	Station code links to arrivals and departures	Station code links to station information
Gainsborough Central	DN21 2EX	GNB	GNB
Gainsborough Lea Road	DN21 1AJ	GBL	GBL
Galashiels	TD1 1BP	GAL	GAL
Garelochhead	G84 0DB	GCH	GCH
Garforth	LS25 2QQ	GRF	GRF
Gargrave	BD23 3PD	GGV	GGV
Garrowhill	G69 1AA	GAR	GAR
Garscadden	G13 3AE	GRS	GRS
Garsdale	LA10 5PP	GSD	GSD
Garston	WD25 9QG	GSN	GSN
Garswood	WN4 0TB	GSW	GSW
Gartcosh	G69 8DF	GRH	GRH
Garth (Bridgend)	CF34 9ES	GMG	GMG
Garth (Powys)	LD4 4AF	GTH	GTH
Garve	IV23 2QF	GVE	GVE
Gathurst	WN6 8JB	GST	GST
Gatley	SK8 4AR	GTY	GTY
Gatwick Airport	RH6 0RD	GTW	GTW
Georgemas Junction	KW12 6XA	GGJ	GGJ
Gerrards Cross	SL9 8PP	GER	GER
Gidea Park	RM2 6DA	GDP	GDP
Giffnock	G46 6JJ	GFN	GFN
Giggleswick	BD24 0EB	GIG	GIG
Gilberdyke	HU15 2YB	GBD	GBD
Gilfach Fargoed	CF81 8LT	GFF	GFF
Gillingham (Dorset)	SP8 4PZ	GIL	GIL
Gillingham (Kent)	ME7 4PA	GLM	GLM
Gilshochill	G23 5AR	GSC	GSC
Gipsy Hill	SE19 1QL	GIP	GIP
Girvan	KA26 9JF	GIR	GIR
Glaisdale	YO21 2QL	GLS	GLS
Glan Conwy	LL28 5ED	GCW	GCW
Glasgow Central	G1 3SA	GLC	GLC
Glasgow Queen Street	G1 2AF	GLQ	GLQ
Glasshoughton	WF10 4TA	GLH	GLH
Glazebrook	WA3 5DD	GLZ	GLZ
Gleneagles	PH3 1JN	GLE	GLE
Glenfinnan	PH37 4LT	GLF	GLF
Glengarnock	KA14 3AT	GLG	GLG
Glenrothes with Thornton	KY1 4ED	GLT	GLT
Glossop	SK13 7DD	GLO	GLO
Gloucester	GL1 1DE	GCR	GCR
Glynde	BN8 6SS	GLY	GLY
Glynn	BT40 3HF		
Gobowen	SY11 3LX	GOB	GOB
Godalming	GU7 1EU	GOD	GOD
Godley	SK14 3SG	GDL	GDL
Godstone	RH9 8EU	GDN	GDN
Goldthorpe	S63 9BS	GOE	GOE
Golf Street	DD7 7JF	GOF	GOF
Golspie	KW10 6ST	GOL	GOL
Gomshall	GU5 9NB	GOM	GOM
Goodmayes	IG3 9TS	GMY	GMY
Goole	DN14 5DD	GOO	GOO
Goostrey	CW4 8PL	GTR	GTR
Gordon Hill	EN2 8RY	GDH	GDH
Gorebridge	EH23 4JX	GBG	GBG
Goring & Streatley	RG8 0ES	GOR	GOR
Goring-by-Sea	BN12 5AB	GBS	GBS
Gorton	M11 1WW	GTO	GTO
Gospel Oak	NW5 1LT	GPO	GPO
Gourock	PA19 1QR	GRK	GRK
Gowerton	SA4 3AJ	GWN	GWN
Goxhill	DN19 7HL	GOX	GOX
Grange Park	N21 1RF	GPK	GPK
Grange-over-Sands	LA11 6EH	GOS	GOS
Grangetown	CF11 7JD	GTN	GTN
Grantham	NG31 6BU	GRA	GRA
Grateley	SP11 7DX	GRT	GRT
Gravelly Hill	B23 7NH	GVH	GVH
Gravesend	DA11 0RR	GRV	GRV
Grays	RM17 6NQ	GRY	GRY
Great Ayton	TS9 6HG	GTA	GTA
Great Bentley	CO7 8LH	GRB	GRB
Great Chesterford	CB10 1QW	GRC	GRC
Great Coates	DN37 9NH	GCT	GCT
Great Malvern	WR14 3BX	GMV	GMV
Great Missenden	HP16 9AY	GMN	GMN
Great Yarmouth	NR30 1SD	GYM	GYM
Greenisland	BT38 8RA		
Green Lane	CH41 9AN	GNL	GNL
Green Road	LA18 5JD	GNR	GNR
Greenbank	CW8 1JU	GBK	GBK
Greenfaulds	G67 2XJ	GRL	GRL
Greenfield	OL3 7JZ	GNF	GNF
Greenford	UB6 8PX	GFD	GFD
Greenhithe	DA9 9RE	GNH	GNH
Greenock Central	PA15 1DH	GKC	GKC
Greenock West	PA16 8UH	GKW	GKW
Greenwich	SE10 8QJ	GNW	GNW
Gretna Green	DG16 5DU	GEA	GEA
Grimsby Docks	DN31 3AG	GMD	GMD
Grimsby Town	DN31 1LY	GMB	GMB
Grindleford	S32 2HY	GRN	GRN
Grosmont	YO22 5PX	GMT	GMT
Grove Park	SE12 9TJ	GRP	GRP
Guide Bridge	OL7 0LJ	GUI	GUI
Guildford	GU1 4UT	GLD	GLD
Guiseley	LS20 9HQ	GSY	GSY
Gunnersbury	W4 4DD	GUN	GUN
Gunnislake	PL18 9DX	GSL	GSL
Gunton	NR11 8UE	GNT	GNT
Gwersyllt	LL11 4SA	GWE	GWE
Gypsy Lane	TS7 0DY	GYP	GYP

== See also ==
- List of heritage railway stations in the United Kingdom
