= UK railway stations – H =

Station name	Postcode links to map of station at Bing Maps	Station code links to arrivals and departures	Station code links to station information
Habrough	DN40 3AP	HAB	HAB
Hackbridge	SM6 7BJ	HCB	HCB
Hackney Central	E8 1LR	HKC	HKC
Hackney Downs	E8 1LP	HAC	HAC
Hackney Wick	E9 5ER	HKW	HKW
Haddenham & Thame Parkway	HP17 8EQ	HDM	HDM
Haddiscoe	NR31 9JA	HAD	HAD
Hadfield	SK13 2AQ	HDF	HDF
Hadley Wood	EN4 0EL	HDW	HDW
Hag Fold	M46 9SG	HGF	HGF
Haggerston	E8 4GY	HGG	HGG
Hagley	DY9 0NX	HAG	HAG
Hairmyres	G74 5LW	HMY	HMY
Hale	WA15 9AD	HAL	HAL
Halesworth	IP19 8JS	HAS	HAS
Halewood	L26 0TQ	HED	HED
Halifax	HX3 9XU	HFX	HFX
Hall Green	B28 8JX	HLG	HLG
Hall i' th' Wood	BL2 3AD	HID	HID
Hall Road	L23 6XX	HLR	HLR
Halling	ME2 1BN	HAI	HAI
Haltwhistle	NE49 9HN	HWH	HWH
Ham Street	TN26 2DU	HMT	HMT
Hamble	SO31 4HT	HME	HME
Hamilton Central	ML3 6QL	HNC	HNC
Hamilton West	ML3 9AY	HNW	HNW
Hammerton	YO26 8DN	HMM	HMM
Hampden Park	BN22 9ND	HMD	HMD
Hampstead Heath	NW3 2QF	HDH	HDH
Hampton	TW12 2HU	HMP	HMP
Hampton Court	KT8 9AE	HMC	HMC
Hampton Wick	KT1 4WB	HMW	HMW
Hampton-in-Arden	B92 0BH	HIA	HIA
Hamstead	B42 1DE	HSD	HSD
Hamworthy	BH16 5DB	HAM	HAM
Hanborough	OX29 8LA	HND	HND
Handforth	SK9 3AB	HTH	HTH
Hanwell	W7 3EB	HAN	HAN
Hapton	BB12 7LG	HPN	HPN
Harlech	LL46 2UF	HRL	HRL
Harlesden	NW10 8NZ	HDN	HDN
Harling Road	NR16 2QR	HRD	HRD
Harlington	LU5 6LU	HLN	HLN
Harlow Mill	CM20 2EL	HWM	HWM
Harlow Town	CM20 2TD	HWN	HWN
Harold Wood	RM3 0PE	HRO	HRO
Harpenden	AL5 4SP	HPD	HPD
Harrietsham	ME17 1JA	HRM	HRM
Harringay	N4 1RE	HGY	HGY
Harringay Green Lanes	N4 1DR	HRY	HRY
Harrington	CA14 5QD	HRR	HRR
Harrogate	HG1 1TF	HGT	HGT
Harrow & Wealdstone	HA3 5AG	HRW	HRW
Harrow-on-the-Hill	HA1 1BB	HOH	HOH
Hartford	CW8 2AE	HTF	HTF
Hartlebury	DY10 4HA	HBY	HBY
Hartlepool	TS24 7ED	HPL	HPL
Hartwood	ML7 5DU	HTW	HTW
Harwich International	CO12 4SP	HPQ	HPQ
Harwich Town	CO12 3NA	HWC	HWC
Haslemere	GU27 1DB	HSL	HSL
Hassocks	BN6 8JD	HSK	HSK
Hastings	TN34 1BA	HGS	HGS
Hatch End	HA5 4HU	HTE	HTE
Hatfield	AL9 5AB	HAT	HAT
Hatfield and Stainforth	DN7 5HL	HFS	HFS
Hatfield Peverel	CM3 2DX	HAP	HAP
Hathersage	S32 1DR	HSG	HSG
Hattersley	SK14 3BJ	HTY	HTY
Hatton	CV35 7LE	HTN	HTN
Havant	PO9 2AA	HAV	HAV
Havenhouse	PE24 4AR	HVN	HVN
Haverfordwest	SA61 2LY	HVF	HVF
Hawarden	CH5 3EG	HWD	HWD
Hawarden Bridge	CH5 1PY	HWB	HWB
Hawkhead	PA2 7AS	HKH	HKH
Haydon Bridge	NE47 6LN	HDB	HDB
Haydons Road	SW19 8RP	HYR	HYR
Hayes	BR2 7DL	HYS	HYS
Hayes and Harlington	UB3 4BX	HAY	HAY
Hayle	TR27 4NG	HYL	HYL
Haymarket	EH11 2BD	HYM	HYM
Haywards Heath	RH16 1DB	HHE	HHE
Hazel Grove	SK7 4EX	HAZ	HAZ
Headbolt Lane	L33 1AU	HBL	HBL
Headcorn	TN27 9SD	HCN	HCN
Headingley	LS5 3LD	HDY	HDY
Headstone Lane	HA2 6NE	HDL	HDL
Heald Green	SK8 3PZ	HDG	HDG
Healing	DN41 7RY	HLI	HLI
Heath High Level	CF23 5QJ	HHL	HHL
Heath Low Level	CF14 3RJ	HLL	HLL
Heathrow Terminals 2 & 3	TW6 1WD	HXX	HXX
Heathrow Terminal 4	TW6 3AA	HAF	HAF
Heathrow Terminal 5	TW6 2GA	HWV	HWV
Heaton Chapel	SK4 4RL	HTC	HTC
Hebden Bridge	HX7 6JD	HBD	HBD
Heckington	NG34 9UP	HEC	HEC
Hedge End	SO30 2XB	HDE	HDE
Hednesford	WS11 3EG	HNF	HNF
Heighington	DL5 6QG	HEI	HEI
Helens Bay	BT19 1TQ		
Helensburgh Central	G84 7EE	HLC	HLC
Helensburgh Upper	G84 9AG	HLU	HLU
Hellifield	BD23 4HN	HLD	HLD
Helmsdale	KW8 6HT	HMS	HMS
Helsby	WA6 0AG	HSB	HSB
Hemel Hempstead	HP3 9BQ	HML	HML
Hendon	NW9 6AX	HEN	HEN
Hengoed	CF82 7LT	HNG	HNG
Henley-in-Arden	B95 5JF	HNL	HNL
Henley-on-Thames	RG9 1BE	HOT	HOT
Hensall	DN14 0QN	HEL	HEL
Hereford	HR1 1BB	HFD	HFD
Herne Bay	CT6 8PJ	HNB	HNB
Herne Hill	SE24 0JW	HNH	HNH
Hersham	KT12 3RW	HER	HER
Hertford East	SG14 1SB	HFE	HFE
Hertford North	SG14 1NB	HFN	HFN
Hessle	HU13 0EY	HES	HES
Heswall	CH60 1XQ	HSW	HSW
Hever	TN8 7ER	HEV	HEV
Heworth	NE10 0LW	HEW	HEW
Hexham	NE46 1ET	HEX	HEX
Heyford	OX25 5PD	HYD	HYD
Heysham Port	LA3 2XE	HHB	HHB
High Brooms	TN2 3XE	HIB	HIB
High Street (Glasgow)	G1 1QF	HST	HST
High Wycombe	HP13 6NN	HWY	HWY
Higham	ME3 7JQ	HGM	HGM
Highams Park	E4 9LA	HIP	HIP
Highbridge and Burnham	TA9 3BT	HIG	HIG
Highbury and Islington	N1 1SB	HHY	HHY
Hightown	L38 3RX	HTO	HTO
Hilden	BT27 4RY		
Hildenborough	TN11 8LX	HLB	HLB
Hillfoot	G61 2BT	HLF	HLF
Hillington East	G52 2LJ	HLE	HLE
Hillington West	G52 4EW	HLW	HLW
Hillside	PR8 2LN	HIL	HIL
Hilsea	PO3 5RQ	HLS	HLS
Hinchley Wood	KT10 0SR	HYW	HYW
Hinckley	LE10 1UE	HNK	HNK
Hindley	WN2 2QL	HIN	HIN
Hinton Admiral	BH23 7DP	HNA	HNA
Hitchin	SG4 9UL	HIT	HIT
Hither Green	SE13 6HE	HGR	HGR
Hockley	SS5 4BG	HOC	HOC
Hollingbourne	ME17 1TX	HBN	HBN
Holmes Chapel	CW4 8AA	HCH	HCH
Holmwood	RH5 4UZ	HLM	HLM
Holton Heath	BH16 6JX	HOL	HOL
Holyhead	LL65 1DQ	HHD	HHD
Holytown	ML1 4LU	HLY	HLY
Holywood	BT18 9JP		
Homerton	E9 6AP	HMN	HMN
Honeybourne	WR11 5XR	HYB	HYB
Honiton	EX14 2DA	HON	HON
Honley	HD7 2LJ	HOY	HOY
Honor Oak Park	SE23 1NX	HPA	HPA
Hook	RG27 9HS	HOK	HOK
Hooton	CH66 7NL	HOO	HOO
Hope (Derbyshire)	S33 6RE	HOP	HOP
Hope (Flintshire)	LL12 9NJ	HPE	HPE
Hopton Heath	SY7 0QD	HPT	HPT
Horden	SR8 4EA	HRE	HRE
Horley	RH6 9HB	HOR	HOR
Hornbeam Park	HG2 8BW	HBP	HBP
Hornsey	N8 7EA	HRN	HRN
Horsforth	LS18 5NP	HRS	HRS
Horsham	RH13 5RB	HRH	HRH
Horsley	KT24 6QX	HSY	HSY
Horton-in-Ribblesdale	BD24 0HL	HIR	HIR
Horwich Parkway	BL6 6LB	HWI	HWI
Hoscar	L40 4BQ	HSC	HSC
Hough Green	WA8 7XU	HGN	HGN
Hounslow	TW3 2EB	HOU	HOU
Hove	BN3 6HW	HOV	HOV
Hoveton & Wroxham	NR12 8UT	HXM	HXM
How Wood	AL2 2JL	HWW	HWW
Howden	DN14 7LD	HOW	HOW
Howwood	PA9 1AZ	HOZ	HOZ
Hoxton	E2 8FF	HOX	HOX
Hoylake	CH47 2AB	HYK	HYK
Hubberts Bridge	PE20 3QR	HBB	HBB
Hucknall	NG15 8AH	HKN	HKN
Huddersfield	HD1 1JF	HUD	HUD
Hull Paragon	HU3 2LL	HUL	HUL
Humphrey Park	M32 9QD	HUP	HUP
Huncoat	BB5 6NQ	HCT	HCT
Hungerford	RG17 0DX	HGD	HGD
Hunmanby	YO14 0LR	HUB	HUB
Huntingdon	PE29 3BP	HUN	HUN
Huntly	AB54 6HZ	HNT	HNT
Hunts Cross	L25 0NL	HNX	HNX
Hurst Green	RH8 0LL	HUR	HUR
Hutton Cranswick	YO25 9QY	HUT	HUT
Huyton	L36 5XA	HUY	HUY
Hyde Central	SK14 1BW	HYC	HYC
Hyde North	SK16 5LJ	HYT	HYT
Hykeham	LN6 9AT	HKM	HKM
Hyndland	G12 9YH	HYN	HYN
Hythe	CO2 8JZ	HYH	HYH

== See also ==
- List of heritage railway stations in the United Kingdom
