= UK railway stations – L =

Station name	Postcode links to map of station at Bing Maps	Station code links to arrivals and departures	Station code links to station information
Ladybank	KY15 7JY	LDY	LDY
Ladywell	SE13 7XB	LAD	LAD
Laindon	SS15 6AB	LAI	LAI
Lairg	IV27 4DH	LRG	LRG
Lake	PO36 8PJ	LKE	LKE
Lakenheath	IP27 9AD	LAK	LAK
Lambeg	BT27 4QD		
Lamphey	SA71 5NR	LAM	LAM
Lanark	ML11 7NR	LNK	LNK
Lancaster	LA1 5NW	LAN	LAN
Lancing	BN15 9HH	LAC	LAC
Landywood	WS6 6JE	LAW	LAW
Langbank	PA14 6YA	LGB	LGB
Langho	BB6 8ED	LHO	LHO
Langley	SL3 6DB	LNY	LNY
Langley Green	B69 4LZ	LGG	LGG
Langley Mill	NG16 4AP	LGM	LGM
Langside	G43 2EP	LGS	LGS
Langwathby	CA10 1NA	LGW	LGW
Langwith-Whaley Thorns	NG20 9BW	LAG	LAG
Lapford	EX17 6AE	LAP	LAP
Lapworth	B94 6LP	LPW	LPW
Larbert	FK5 4AW	LBT	LBT
Largs	KA30 8AN	LAR	LAR
Larkhall	ML9 1DP	LRH	LRH
Larne Harbour	BT40 1BA		
Larne Town	BT40 1HW		
Laurencekirk	AB30 1NN	LAU	LAU
Lawrence Hill	BS5 9JD	LWH	LWH
Layton	FY3 7JY	LAY	LAY
Lazonby & Kirkoswald	CA10 1BQ	LZB	LZB
Lea Bridge	E10 7PG	LEB	LEB
Lea Green	WA9 4QF	LEG	LEG
Lea Hall	B33 8JU	LEH	LEH
Leagrave	LU4 9BA	LEA	LEA
Lealholm	YO21 2AG	LHM	LHM
Leamington Spa	CV31 3NS	LMS	LMS
Leasowe	CH46 1QN	LSW	LSW
Leatherhead	KT22 7SQ	LHD	LHD
Ledbury	HR8 1AR	LED	LED
Lee	SE12 0AD	LEE	LEE
Leeds	LS1 4JB	LDS	LDS
Leicester	LE2 0HH	LEI	LEI
Leigh	TN11 8RU	LIH	LIH
Leigh On Sea	SS9 2ET	LES	LES
Leighton Buzzard	LU7 7LY	LBZ	LBZ
Lelant	TR26 3DW	LEL	LEL
Lelant Saltings	TR27 6HB	LTS	LTS
Lenham	ME17 2HR	LEN	LEN
Lenzie	G66 4LP	LNZ	LNZ
Leominster	HR6 8AR	LEO	LEO
Letchworth Garden City	SG6 3AN	LET	LET
Leuchars	KY16 0AA	LEU	LEU
Leven	KY8 4LQ	LEV	LEV
Levenshulme	M19 3PJ	LVM	LVM
Lewes	BN7 2XP	LWS	LWS
Lewisham	SE13 7SA	LEW	LEW
Leyland	PR5 2XB	LEY	LEY
Leyton Midland Road	E10 6RN	LEM	LEM
Leytonstone High Road	E11 4RP	LER	LER
Lichfield City	WS14 9DZ	LIC	LIC
Lichfield Trent Valley	WS14 9HY	LTV	LTV
Lidlington	MK43 0RE	LID	LID
Limehouse	E14 7JD	LHS	LHS
Lincoln	LN5 7EW	LCN	LCN
Lingfield	RH7 6EH	LFD	LFD
Lingwood	NR13 4BB	LGD	LGD
Linlithgow	EH49 6AF	LIN	LIN
Liphook	GU30 7DN	LIP	LIP
Lisburn	BT28 1XW		
Liskeard	PL14 4DZ	LSK	LSK
Liss	GU33 7AB	LIS	LIS
Lisvane & Thornhill	CF14 0UE	LVT	LVT
Little Kimble	HP17 0XN	LTK	LTK
Little Sutton	CH66 1NU	LTT	LTT
Littleborough	OL15 8DE	LTL	LTL
Littlehampton	BN17 7BX	LIT	LIT
Littlehaven	RH12 4BW	LVN	LVN
Littleport	CB6 1JL	LTP	LTP
Liverpool Central	L1 1JT	LVC	LVC
Liverpool James Street	L2 7PQ	LVJ	LVJ
Liverpool Lime Street	L1 1RJ	LIV	LIV
Liverpool South Parkway	L19 5NE	LPY	LPY
Livingston North	EH54 8PL	LSN	LSN
Livingston South	EH54 9DA	LVG	LVG
Llanaber	LL42 1AZ	LLA	LLA
Llanbedr	LL45 2LR	LBR	LBR
Llanbister Road	LD1 5UW	LLT	LLT
Llanbradach	CF83 3NE	LNB	LNB
Llandaf	CF14 2EZ	LLN	LLN
Llandanwg	LL46 2SD	LDN	LDN
Llandecwyn	LL47 6YN	LLC	LLC
Llandeilo	SA19 6LE	LLL	LLL
Llandovery	SA20 0BE	LLV	LLV
Llandrindod	LD1 5BB	LLO	LLO
Llandudno	LL30 2AF	LLD	LLD
Llandudno Junction	LL31 9NB	LLJ	LLJ
Llandybie	SA18 3UN	LLI	LLI
Llanelli	SA15 2RN	LLE	LLE
Llanfairfechan	LL33 0BP	LLF	LLF
Llanfairpwll	LL61 5UJ	LPG	LPG
Llangadog	SA19 9LU	LLG	LLG
Llangammarch	LD4 4EE	LLM	LLM
Llangennech	SA14 8UY	LLH	LLH
Llangynllo	LD7 1TA	LGO	LGO
Llanharan	CF72 9QA	LLR	LLR
Llanhilleth	NP13 2HT	LTH	LTH
Llanishen	CF14 0SA	LLS	LLS
Llanrwst	LL26 0EG	LWR	LWR
Llansamlet	SA7 9BP	LAS	LAS
Llantwit Major	CF61 2XD	LWM	LWM
Llanwrda	SA19 8EH	LNR	LNR
Llanwrtyd	LD5 4RP	LNW	LNW
Llwyngwril	LL37 2JS	LLW	LLW
Llwynypia	CF40 2JH	LLY	LLY
Loch Awe	PA33 1AQ	LHA	LHA
Loch Eil Outward Bound	PH33 7NW	LHE	LHE
Lochailort	PH38 4LZ	LCL	LCL
Locheilside	PH33 7NP	LCS	LCS
Lochgelly	KY5 9EL	LCG	LCG
Lochluichart	IV23 2PZ	LCC	LCC
Lochwinnoch	PA12 4JF	LHW	LHW
Lockerbie	DG11 2HE	LOC	LOC
Lockwood	HD1 3SW	LCK	LCK
London Blackfriars	EC4V 4DY	BFR	BFR
London Bridge	SE1 2SZ	LBG	LBG
London Cannon Street	EC4R 2AT	CST	CST
London Charing Cross	WC2N 6NN	CHX	CHX
London Euston	NW1 2RZ	EUS	EUS
London Fenchurch Street	EC3M 4AJ	FST	FST
London Fields	E8 3PH	LOF	LOF
London King's Cross	N1 9AX	KGX	KGX
London Liverpool Street	EC2A 2HL	LST	LST
London Marylebone	NW1 6JR	MYB	MYB
London Paddington	W2 6HT	PAD	PAD
London Road (Brighton)	BN1 4QS	LRB	LRB
London Road (Guildford)	GU1 4DQ	LRD	LRD
London St Pancras International	NW1 2QL	STP	STP
London Victoria	SW1E 5ND	VIC	VIC
London Waterloo	SE1 7NS	WAT	WAT
London Waterloo East	SE1 8TD	WAE	WAE
Long Buckby	NN6 7PF	LBK	LBK
Long Eaton	NG10 3GL	LGE	LGE
Long Preston	BD23 4RY	LPR	LPR
Longbeck	TS11 6HD	LGK	LGK
Longbridge	B31 4HG	LOB	LOB
Longcross	GU25 4JR	LNG	LNG
Longfield	DA3 7QA	LGF	LGF
Longniddry	EH32 0LS	LND	LND
Longport	ST6 4NF	LPT	LPT
Longton	ST3 2JG	LGN	LGN
Looe	PL13 1LS	LOO	LOO
Lostock	BL6 4JP	LOT	LOT
Lostock Gralam	CW9 7PR	LTG	LTG
Lostock Hall	PR5 5BU	LOH	LOH
Lostwithiel	PL22 0DY	LOS	LOS
Loughborough	LE11 1ET	LBO	LBO
Loughborough Junction	SW9 8SA	LGJ	LGJ
Low Moor	BD12 7BD	LMR	LMR
Lowdham	NG14 7HH	LOW	LOW
Lower Sydenham	SE26 5BN	LSY	LSY
Lowestoft	NR32 2EG	LWT	LWT
Ludlow	SY8 1PY	LUD	LUD
Lurgan	BT66 6JB		
Luton	LU1 2LT	LUT	LUT
Luton Airport Parkway	LU2 0ZZ	LTN	LTN
Luxulyan	PL30 5EF	LUX	LUX
Lydney	GL15 5ER	LYD	LYD
Lye	DY9 8ES	LYE	LYE
Lymington Pier	SO41 5ZE	LYP	LYP
Lymington Town	SO41 9AY	LYT	LYT
Lympstone Commando	EX8 5AR	LYC	LYC
Lympstone Village	EX8 5EU	LYM	LYM
Lytham	FY8 5PA	LTM	LTM

== See also ==
- List of heritage railway stations in the United Kingdom
