= UK railway stations – E =

Station name	Postcode links to map of station at Bing Maps	Station code links to arrivals and departures	Station code links to station information
Eaglescliffe	TS16 0BT	EAG	EAG
Ealing Broadway	W5 2PT	EAL	EAL
Earlestown	WA12 9AU	ERL	ERL
Earley	RG6 7DY	EAR	EAR
Earlsfield	SW18 3NY	EAD	EAD
Earlswood (Surrey)	RH1 6JH	ELD	ELD
Earlswood (West Midlands)	B94 5JS	EWD	EWD
East Croydon	CR0 1LF	ECR	ECR
East Didsbury	M20 5NE	EDY	EDY
East Dulwich	SE22 8EF	EDW	EDW
East Farleigh	ME16 9NB	EFL	EFL
East Garforth	LS25 2NS	EGF	EGF
East Grinstead	RH19 1EB	EGR	EGR
East Kilbride	G74 1NF	EKL	EKL
East Linton	EH40 3AJ	ELT	ELT
East Malling	ME19 6AN	EML	EML
East Midlands Parkway	NG11 0EE	EMD	EMD
East Tilbury	SS17 0RQ	ETL	ETL
East Worthing	BN14 8ED	EWR	EWR
Eastbourne	BN21 3QJ	EBN	EBN
Eastbrook	CF64 4LD	EBK	EBK
Easterhouse	G69 6BL	EST	EST
Eastham Rake	CH62 9EX	ERA	ERA
Eastleigh	SO50 9FN	ESL	ESL
Eastrington	DN14 7PX	EGN	EGN
Ebbsfleet International	DA10 1EB	EBD	EBD
Ebbw Vale Parkway	NP23 8AP	EBV	EBV
Ebbw Vale Town	NP23 6DN	EBB	EBB
Eccles	M30 0DN	ECC	ECC
Eccles Road	NR16 2JQ	ECS	ECS
Eccleston Park	L35 7LP	ECL	ECL
Edale	S33 7ZP	EDL	EDL
Eden Park	BR3 3DE	EDN	EDN
Edenbridge	TN8 6JQ	EBR	EBR
Edenbridge Town	TN8 5LS	EBT	EBT
Edge Hill	L7 6ND	EDG	EDG
Edinburgh Gateway	EH12 9GF	EGY	EGY
Edinburgh Park	EH11 4DF	EDP	EDP
Edinburgh Waverley	EH1 1BG	EDB	EDB
Edmonton Green	N9 9DX	EDR	EDR
Effingham Junction	KT24 5HJ	EFF	EFF
Eggesford	EX18 7QT	EGG	EGG
Egham	TW20 9NT	EGH	EGH
Egton	YO21 1UX	EGT	EGT
Elephant & Castle	SE17 1LB	EPH	EPH
Elgin	IV30 1QJ	ELG	ELG
Ellesmere Port	CH65 4FG	ELP	ELP
Elmers End	BR3 4DW	ELE	ELE
Elmstead Woods	BR7 5NN	ESD	ESD
Elmswell	IP30 9HR	ESW	ESW
Elsecar	S74 8DB	ELR	ELR
Elsenham	CM22 6LX	ESM	ESM
Elstree & Borehamwood	WD6 1EX	ELS	ELS
Eltham	SE9 1SA	ELW	ELW
Elton and Orston	NG13 9LH	ELO	ELO
Ely	CB7 4DJ	ELY	ELY
Emerson Park	RM11 3HS	EMP	EMP
Emsworth	PO10 7PN	EMS	EMS
Energlyn and Churchill Park	CF83 2QR	ECP	ECP
Enfield Chase	EN2 7AA	ENC	ENC
Enfield Lock	EN3 6AA	ENL	ENL
Enfield Town	EN1 2AA	ENF	ENF
Entwistle	BL7 0NG	ENT	ENT
Epsom	KT19 8EU	EPS	EPS
Epsom Downs	KT17 4JP	EPD	EPD
Erdington	B23 6PU	ERD	ERD
Eridge	TN3 9LD	ERI	ERI
Erith	DA8 1TY	ERH	ERH
Esher	KT10 8DT	ESH	ESH
Eskbank	EH22 3NX	EKB	EKB
Essex Road	N1 2SU	EXR	EXR
Etchingham	TN19 7PA	ETC	ETC
Euxton Balshaw Lane	PR7 6PE	EBA	EBA
Evesham	WR11 4JG	EVE	EVE
Ewell East	KT17 1QR	EWE	EWE
Ewell West	KT17 2DH	EWW	EWW
Exeter Central	EX4 3SB	EXC	EXC
Exeter St Davids	EX4 4NT	EXD	EXD
Exeter St Thomas	EX4 1AQ	EXT	EXT
Exhibition Centre	G3 8LE	EXG	EXG
Exmouth	EX8 1BZ	EXM	EXM
Exton	EX3 0PG	EXN	EXN
Eynsford	DA4 0HP	EYN	EYN

== See also ==
- List of heritage railway stations in the United Kingdom
