= UK railway stations – F =

Station name	Postcode links to map of station at Bing Maps	Station code links to arrivals and departures	Station code links to station information
Fairbourne	LL38 2AQ	FRB	FRB
Fairfield	M34 5QA	FRF	FRF
Fairlie	KA29 0DY	FRL	FRL
Fairwater	CF5 2LR	FRW	FRW
Falconwood	SE9 2RN	FCN	FCN
Falkirk Grahamston	FK1 1UP	FKG	FKG
Falkirk High	FK1 5NE	FKK	FKK
Falls of Cruachan	PA33 1AN	FOC	FOC
Falmer	BN1 9QX	FMR	FMR
Falmouth Docks	TR11 4NR	FAL	FAL
Falmouth Town	TR11 4LT	FMT	FMT
Fareham	PO14 1NP	FRM	FRM
Farnborough (Main)	GU14 7NL	FNB	FNB
Farnborough North	GU14 8AQ	FNN	FNN
Farncombe	GU7 3NF	FNC	FNC
Farnham	GU9 8AD	FNH	FNH
Farningham Road	DA4 9JB	FNR	FNR
Farnworth	BL4 7SA	FNW	FNW
Farringdon	EC1M 6BY	ZFD	ZFD
Fauldhouse	EH47 9DL	FLD	FLD
Faversham	ME13 8JJ	FAV	FAV
Faygate	RH12 4DN	FGT	FGT
Fazakerley	L9 9EW	FAZ	FAZ
Fearn	IV20 1RP	FRN	FRN
Featherstone	WF7 5BN	FEA	FEA
Felixstowe	IP11 9UG	FLX	FLX
Feltham	TW13 4BZ	FEL	FEL
Feniton	EX14 3EX	FNT	FNT
Fenny Stratford	MK2 2XT	FEN	FEN
Fernhill	CF45 3DG	FER	FER
Ferriby	HU14 3EH	FRY	FRY
Ferryside	SA17 5SF	FYS	FYS
Ffairfach	SA19 6UL	FFA	FFA
Filey	YO14 9PE	FIL	FIL
Filton Abbey Wood	BS34 7HZ	FIT	FIT
Finchley Road & Frognal	NW3 6EL	FNY	FNY
Finsbury Park	N4 2DQ	FPK	FPK
Finaghy	BT10 0HD		
Finstock	OX7 3AW	FIN	FIN
Fishbourne	PO19 3QJ	FSB	FSB
Fishersgate	BN41 1LG	FSG	FSG
Fishguard and Goodwick	SA64 0DG	FGW	FGW
Fishguard Harbour	SA64 0BY	FGH	FGH
Fiskerton	NG25 0UD	FSK	FSK
Fitzwilliam	WF9 5BY	FZW	FZW
Five Ways	B15 1QA	FWY	FWY
Fleet	GU51 3QY	FLE	FLE
Flimby	CA15 8QQ	FLM	FLM
Flint	CH6 5PG	FLN	FLN
Flitwick	MK45 1DS	FLT	FLT
Flixton	M41 6JL	FLI	FLI
Flowery Field	SK14 4TF	FLF	FLF
Folkestone Central	CT19 5HB	FKC	FKC
Folkestone West	CT20 3PA	FKW	FKW
Ford	BN18 0BH	FOD	FOD
Forest Gate	E7 0NE	FOG	FOG
Forest Hill	SE23 3HB	FOH	FOH
Formby	L37 3PD	FBY	FBY
Forres	IV36 1GZ	FOR	FOR
Forsinard	KW13 6YT	FRS	FRS
Fort Matilda	PA16 7TU	FTM	FTM
Fort William	PH33 6EN	FTW	FTW
Four Oaks	B74 2UX	FOK	FOK
Foxfield	LA20 6BX	FOX	FOX
Foxton	CB22 6SH	FXN	FXN
Frant	TN3 9BJ	FRT	FRT
Fratton	PO1 5AW	FTN	FTN
Freshfield	L37 1YH	FRE	FRE
Freshford	BA3 6EQ	FFD	FFD
Frimley	GU16 5QH	FML	FML
Frinton-on-Sea	CO13 9JT	FRI	FRI
Frizinghall	BD9 4JB	FZH	FZH
Frodsham	WA6 6PT	FRD	FRD
Frome	BA11 1RE	FRO	FRO
Fulwell	TW11 0SR	FLW	FLW
Furness Vale	SK23 7PQ	FNV	FNV
Furze Platt	SL6 7SQ	FZP	FZP

== See also ==
- List of heritage railway stations in the United Kingdom
