= UK railway stations – K =

Station name	Postcode links to map of station at Bing Maps	Station code links to arrivals and departures	Station code links to station information
Kearsley	BL4 8DU	KSL	KSL
Kearsney	CT17 0RN	KSN	KSN
Keighley	BD21 4HP	KEI	KEI
Keith	AB55 5GB	KEH	KEH
Kelvedon	CO5 9LT	KEL	KEL
Kelvindale	G20 0TB	KVD	KVD
Kemble	GL7 6AU	KEM	KEM
Kempston Hardwick	MK43 9NR	KMH	KMH
Kempton Park	TW16 5BX	KMP	KMP
Kemsing	TN15 6YP	KMS	KMS
Kemsley	ME10 2PL	KML	KML
Kendal	LA9 6SA	KEN	KEN
Kenilworth	CV8 1JJ	KNW	KNW
Kenley	CR8 5DF	KLY	KLY
Kennett	CB8 7QF	KNE	KNE
Kennishead	G46 8HN	KNS	KNS
Kensal Green	NW10 5JT	KNL	KNL
Kensal Rise	NW10 5RT	KNR	KNR
Kensington (Olympia)	W14 8HW	KPA	KPA
Kent House	BR3 1JD	KTH	KTH
Kentish Town	NW5 2TU	KTN	KTN
Kentish Town West	NW5 3ED	KTW	KTW
Kenton	HA3 0JA	KNT	KNT
Kents Bank	LA11 7BG	KBK	KBK
Kettering	NN15 7JT	KET	KET
Kew Bridge	TW8 0JA	KWB	KWB
Kew Gardens	TW9 3QA	KWG	KWG
Keyham	PL2 2BD	KEY	KEY
Keynsham	BS31 2BT	KYN	KYN
Kidbrooke	SE3 9PL	KDB	KDB
Kidderminster	DY10 1UG	KID	KID
Kidsgrove	ST7 1BX	KDG	KDG
Kidwelly	SA17 4UW	KWL	KWL
Kilburn High Road	NW6 5UD	KBN	KBN
Kildale	YO21 2RJ	KLD	KLD
Kildonan	KW8 6HY	KIL	KIL
Kilgetty	SA68 0XR	KGT	KGT
Kilmarnock	KA1 2AF	KMK	KMK
Kilmaurs	KA3 2TU	KLM	KLM
Kilpatrick	G60 5LX	KPT	KPT
Kilwinning	KA13 6NT	KWN	KWN
Kinbrace	KW11 6UB	KBC	KBC
Kingham	OX7 6UP	KGM	KGM
Kinghorn	KY3 9RA	KGH	KGH
Kings Heath	B14 7SN	KIH	KIH
Kings Langley	WD4 8LL	KGL	KGL
King's Lynn	PE30 1NX	KLN	KLN
Kings Norton	B30 1AB	KNN	KNN
Kings Nympton	EX37 9EU	KGN	KGN
King's Park	G44 4HS	KGP	KGP
Kings Sutton	OX17 3NZ	KGS	KGS
Kingsknowe	EH14 2EF	KGE	KGE
Kingston	KT1 1UJ	KNG	KNG
Kingswood	KT20 6HS	KND	KND
Kingussie	PH21 1JA	KIN	KIN
Kintbury	RG17 9UN	KIT	KIT
Kintore	AB51 0YF	KTR	KTR
Kirby Cross	CO13 0LU	KBX	KBX
Kirk Sandall	DN3 1SE	KKS	KKS
Kirkby	L32 2AE	KIR	KIR
Kirkby-in-Ashfield	NG17 8DB	KKB	KKB
Kirkby-in-Furness	LA17 7TA	KBF	KBF
Kirkby Stephen	CA17 4LF	KSW	KSW
Kirkcaldy	KY1 1YL	KDY	KDY
Kirkconnel	DG4 6LU	KRK	KRK
Kirkdale	L20 2BX	KKD	KKD
Kirkham and Wesham	PR4 3AH	KKM	KKM
Kirkhill	G72 8NB	KKH	KKH
Kirknewton	EH27 8DD	KKN	KKN
Kirkstall Forge	LS5 3NF	KLF	KLF
Kirkwood	ML5 5NQ	KWD	KWD
Kirton Lindsey	DN21 4BE	KTL	KTL
Kiveton Bridge	S26 6QX	KIV	KIV
Kiveton Park	S26 6NP	KVP	KVP
Knaresborough	HG5 8BX	KNA	KNA
Knebworth	SG3 6HL	KBW	KBW
Knighton	LD7 1DY	KNI	KNI
Knockholt	TN14 7HR	KCK	KCK
Knottingley	WF11 8RN	KNO	KNO
Knucklas	LD7 1RR	KNU	KNU
Knutsford	WA16 6DN	KNF	KNF
Kyle of Lochalsh	IV40 8AQ	KYL	KYL

== See also ==
- List of heritage railway stations in the United Kingdom
