= Special-purpose railway stations in the United Kingdom =

This article lists special-purpose railway stations, i.e. those which meet one or more of these criteria:

- cannot be accessed by the public from the street;
- can only be accessed from private land;
- can only be accessed by appointment;
- only serve a particular venue, such as a factory, harbour or stadium; or
- are not listed in the public timetable, or provide service on event-days only.

It also lists closed stations that satisfied one or more of these criteria when open, and stations which at some point in their history satisfied one or more of the criteria.

== List ==
Station	Open?	Year of closure	Always/still special purpose?	Criteria (Note: In the case of a station which was at some point special-purpose, but is not now (or was not at some point in its life), the criteria refer to when the station was special-purpose.)					Notes	Citation
Station	Open?	Year of closure	Always/still special purpose?	No public access?	Private land?	Appointment only?	One venue only?	Omitted from timetable/event day service?	Notes	Citation
Holton Heath	Open	—N/a	No	Yes	Yes	Yes	Yes	Possibly, until public opening	Initially opened for exclusive use of Royal Naval Cordite Factory, Holton Heath	
Kempton Park	Open	—N/a	Yes	No	Yes	No	No	No	Serves Kempton Park Racecourse. Has had a regular service since 2006.	
Lympstone Commando	Open	—N/a	Yes	Yes	No	No	Yes	No	Used for visitors to the Royal Marine Commando Training Centre. The station is owned by Network Rail and has been accessible to the public since the creation of a walking and cycling path between the station and training centre.	
Singer	Open	—N/a	No	No	No	No	Yes	?	Built to serve the Singer's sewing machine factory which now no longer exists but keeps its name. Now has a regular service.	
Smallbrook Junction	Open	—N/a	Yes	Yes	No	No	Yes	No	Built as a connection to two railways with no actual entrance to the station. This is the only station in the UK that has been built for this purpose.	
Aintree Racecourse	Closed	1962	Yes	Yes	?	No	Yes	Yes	Built to serve Aintree Racecourse	
Ampress Works Halt	Closed	1989	Yes	?	?	No	Yes	Yes	Served the Wellworthy works near Lymington, Hampshire	
Angling Club Cottage Platform	Closed	1940's	Yes	Yes	Yes	No	Yes	?		
Ardeer Platform	Closed	1966	Yes	No	?	No	Yes	?	Built to serve the ICI Nobel Explosives Factory in Stevenston, North Ayrshire. Platforms still exist.	
Bogside	Closed	1967	No	Yes	Yes	No	No	?	Built to serve the former Bogside Racecourse in Irvine, and also Bogside Golf Club	
Boothferry Park Halt	Closed	1986	Yes	No	No	No	Yes	Yes	Served Boothferry Park football stadium, Hull	
Dover Western Docks	Closed	1994	Yes	No	?	No	Yes	No	Closed when the channel tunnel opened	
Filey Holiday Camp	Closed	1977	Yes	No	Yes	No	Yes	No	Closed due to more people using cars	
Folkestone Harbour	Closed	2001	Yes	No	?	No	Yes	No	Line officially closed in 2014	
IBM	Closed	2018	Yes	Yes	Yes	No	Yes	No	Opened to serve a large facility owned by IBM that employed 4,000 at the time of opening but today much of the site has been sold off to other companies.	
Manchester United Football Ground	Closed	2018	Yes	No	?	No	Yes	Yes	Built outside of the Old Trafford stadium and was only open on match days. Service suspended since 2018	
Meadowbank Stadium	Closed	1998	Yes	No	No	No	Yes	Yes	Opened to serve the Meadowbank Stadium, Edinburgh	
Melton Halt	Closed	1989	Yes	Yes	Yes	No	Yes	No	Built to serve the Humber Cement Works	
Newhaven Marine	Closed	2006	Yes	No	?	No	Yes	No	Served the Ferry Terminal but closed due to more people using cars and the closeness of Newhaven Harbour station. Officially closed 2020.	
New Holland Pier	Closed	1981	Yes	No	?	No	Yes	No	Was built to serve the ferry service over the Humber to Hull. Closed when the Humber bridge opened and the ferry service ceased.	
Purfleet Rifle Range	Closed	1948	No	Yes	Yes	?	Yes	?	Opened for military use in 1911 and public use in 1921	
Ramsline Halt	Closed	1997	Yes	No	No	No	Yes	Yes	Served the Baseball Ground, Derby but closed when Derby County F.C. moved to a new stadium	
Redcar British Steel	Closed	2019	Yes	Yes	Yes	No	Yes	No	Built to serve the nearby Teesside Steelworks site. Services suspended in 2019.	
Rowntree Halt	Closed	1988	Yes	Yes	Yes	No	Yes	Yes	Opened for the workers who worked at the Rowntree's factory in York. Officially closed in 1989.	
Ruddington Factory Halt	Closed	1948	Yes	?	?	Yes	Yes	?	Built to serve the Ruddington Ordnance & Supply Depot	
Sinfin North	Closed	1993	Yes	Yes	Yes	No	Yes	No	Served the Rolls-Royce factory at Derby. Not officially closed until 1998, with a replacement taxi service being provided in the interim.	
Stanlow and Thornton	Closed	2022	Yes	No	Yes	No	Yes	No	Built to serve Stanlow Oil Refinery. Service has been suspended since February 2022	
Thrybergh Tins	Closed	1968	Yes	?	?	No	?	Yes		
Tilbury Riverside	Closed	1992	Yes	?	?	No	Yes	No		
Wadsley Bridge	Closed	1996	No	No	No	No	Yes	Yes	Lost its regular service in 1956 but continued to be served by football specials until 1996	
Watford Stadium	Closed	1996	Yes	No	No	No	Yes	Yes	Served Vicarage Road, the home stadium of Watford F.C., was only open on match days, saw its last train when a road widening scheme severed the line, and was officially closed in 2003	
Weymouth Quay	Closed	1987	Yes	No	?	No	Yes	No	Visited by one-off charter service in 1999	
