= UK railway stations – D =

Station name	Postcode links to map of station at Bing Maps	Station code links to arrivals and departures	Station code links to station information
Dagenham Dock	RM9 6PX	DDK	DDK
Daisy Hill	BL5 2LA	DSY	DSY
Dalgety Bay	KY11 9NJ	DAG	DAG
Dalmally	PA33 1AA	DAL	DAL
Dalmarnock	G40 4LR	DAK	DAK
Dalmeny	EH30 9JU	DAM	DAM
Dalmuir	G81 4AJ	DMR	DMR
Dalreoch	G82 4JT	DLR	DLR
Dalry	KA24 4DD	DLY	DLY
Dalston	CA5 7LT	DLS	DLS
Dalston Junction	E8 3DE	DLJ	DLJ
Dalston Kingsland	N16 8JN	DLK	DLK
Dalton	LA15 8PL	DLT	DLT
Dalwhinnie	PH19 1AD	DLW	DLW
Danby	YO21 2JL	DNY	DNY
Danescourt	CF5 2RX	DCT	DCT
Danzey	B94 5BE	DZY	DZY
Darlaston	WS10 8NA	DAS	DAS
Darlington	DL1 5AE	DAR	DAR
Darnall	S9 4JR	DAN	DAN
Darsham	IP17 3PN	DSM	DSM
Dartford	DA1 1BP	DFD	DFD
Darton	S75 5HX	DRT	DRT
Darwen	BB3 3EH	DWN	DWN
Datchet	SL3 9ED	DAT	DAT
Davenport	SK2 6JP	DVN	DVN
Dawlish	EX7 9PJ	DWL	DWL
Dawlish Warren	EX7 0NF	DWW	DWW
Deal	CT14 9ST	DEA	DEA
Dean	SP5 1JF	DEN	DEN
Deansgate	M3 4LG	DGT	DGT
Deganwy	LL31 9EJ	DGY	DGY
Deighton	HD2 1LX	DHN	DHN
Delamere	CW8 2JQ	DLM	DLM
Denby Dale	HD8 8QE	DBD	DBD
Denham	UB9 5ES	DNM	DNM
Denham Golf Club	UB9 5EL	DGC	DGC
Denmark Hill	SE5 8AQ	DMK	DMK
Dent	LA10 5RF	DNT	DNT
Denton	M34 3WE	DTN	DTN
Deptford	SE8 5QA	DEP	DEP
Derby	DE1 2RS	DBY	DBY
Derby Road	IP3 8HX	DBR	DBR
Derriaghy	BT17 9EP		
Derry~Londonderry	BT47 6DH		
Devonport	PL1 4QN	DPT	DPT
Dewsbury	WF13 2PE	DEW	DEW
Dhu Varren	BT56 8ED		
Didcot Parkway	OX11 7FB	DID	DID
Digby & Sowton	EX2 7TG	DIG	DIG
Dilton Marsh	BA13 3RU	DMH	DMH
Dinas Powys	CF64 4LD	DNS	DNS
Dinas Rhondda	CF40 2PJ	DMG	DMG
Dingle Road	CF64 1JL	DGL	DGL
Dingwall	IV15 9JD	DIN	DIN
Dinsdale	DL2 1DX	DND	DND
Dinting	SK14 6BP	DTG	DTG
Disley	SK12 2AE	DSL	DSL
Diss	IP22 4HN	DIS	DIS
Dockyard	PL2 1RZ	DOC	DOC
Dodworth	S75 3JJ	DOD	DOD
Dolau	LD1 5TG	DOL	DOL
Doleham	TN35 4NA	DLH	DLH
Dolgarrog	LL26 0YR	DLG	DLG
Dolwyddelan	LL25 0TJ	DWD	DWD
Doncaster	DN1 1PE	DON	DON
Dorchester South	DT1 2DN	DCH	DCH
Dorchester West	DT1 1QX	DCW	DCW
Dore & Totley	S17 3LR	DOR	DOR
Dorking	RH4 1TF	DKG	DKG
Dorking Deepdene	RH4 1AH	DPD	DPD
Dorking West	RH4 5EE	DKT	DKT
Dormans	RH7 6NJ	DMS	DMS
Dorridge	B93 8QH	DDG	DDG
Dove Holes	SK17 8BQ	DVH	DVH
Dover Priory	CT17 9TY	DVP	DVP
Dovercourt	CO12 3AG	DVC	DVC
Dovey Junction	SY20 8SU	DVY	DVY
Downham Market	PE38 9EN	DOW	DOW
Downshire	BT38 7EF		
Drayton Green	W7 1LX	DRG	DRG
Drayton Park	N5 1PG	DYP	DYP
Drem	EH39 5AS	DRM	DRM
Driffield	YO25 6NL	DRF	DRF
Drigg	CA19 1XR	DRI	DRI
Droitwich Spa	WR9 9BD	DTW	DTW
Dronfield	S18 2XA	DRO	DRO
Drumchapel	G15 6QX	DMC	DMC
Drumfrochar	PA15 4NE	DFR	DFR
Drumgelloch	ML6 7BL	DRU	DRU
Drumry	G81 2TE	DMY	DMY
Duddeston	B7 4ST	DUD	DUD
Dudley Port	DY4 8RB	DDP	DDP
Duffield	DE56 4EQ	DFI	DFI
Duirinish	IV40 8BD	DRN	DRN
Duke Street	G31 1NW	DST	DST
Dullingham	CB8 9UT	DUL	DUL
Dumbarton Central	G82 1NL	DBC	DBC
Dumbarton East	G82 1RH	DBE	DBE
Dumbreck	G41 5BQ	DUM	DUM
Dumfries	DG1 1LU	DMF	DMF
Dumpton Park	CT11 7TB	DMP	DMP
Dunbar	EH42 1JX	DUN	DUN
Dunblane	FK15 9ET	DBL	DBL
Duncraig	IV52 8TZ	DCG	DCG
Dundee	DD1 4DB	DEE	DEE
Dunfermline City	KY12 7HT	DFE	DFE
Dunfermline Queen Margaret	KY12 0TY	DFL	DFL
Dunkeld & Birnam	PH8 0BN	DKD	DKD
Dunmurry	BT17 0AA		
Dunlop	KA3 4AS	DNL	DNL
Dunrobin Castle	KW10 6SH	DNO	DNO
Dunston	NE11 9TS	DOT	DOT
Dunton Green	TN13 2UU	DNG	DNG
Durham	DH1 4RB	DHM	DHM
Durrington-on-Sea	BN12 6BT	DUR	DUR
Dyce	AB21 7DQ	DYC	DYC
Dyffryn Ardudwy	LL44 2BF	DYF	DYF

== See also ==
- List of heritage railway stations in the United Kingdom
