= List of railway stations in Hong Kong =

For railway stations in Hong Kong, see:

- List of MTR stations
- MTR Light Rail § Stops and routes
- Hong Kong International Airport Automated People Mover § Facts
- Hong Kong Tramways § Routes and stops
- Peak Tram § Route
- Hong Kong Disneyland Railroad
- Ocean Express

Conventional railway shares tracks with the East Rail line, a regional/suburban service integrated within the MTR network. Currently cross-border trains only stop at Hung Hom station in Kowloon. The Tuen Ma line was also built to conventional railway standard but currently only regional/suburban service is available.

== See also ==
- Category:Former railway stations in Hong Kong
