= UK railway stations – J =

Station name	Postcode links to map of station at Bing Maps	Station code links to arrivals and departures	Station code links to station information
James Cook University Hospital	TS4 3BW	JCH	JCH
Jewellery Quarter	B18 6LE	JEQ	JEQ
Johnston	SA62 3PZ	JOH	JOH
Johnstone	PA5 8HE	JHN	JHN
Jordanhill	G13 1QL	JOR	JOR
Jordanstown	BT37 0LT		

== See also ==
- List of heritage railway stations in the United Kingdom
