= UK railway stations – I =

Station name	Postcode links to map of station at Bing Maps	Station code links to arrivals and departures	Station code links to station information
Ifield	RH11 0JP	IFI	IFI
Ilford	IG1 2DG	IFD	IFD
Ilkeston	DE7 5TE	ILN	ILN
Ilkley	LS29 8HF	ILK	ILK
Imperial Wharf	SW6 2ZH	IMW	IMW
Ince	WN3 4RH	INC	INC
Ince and Elton	CH2 4NE	INE	INE
Ingatestone	CM4 0BH	INT	INT
Insch	AB52 6WN	INS	INS
Invergordon	IV18 0RQ	IGD	IGD
Invergowrie	DD2 5AP	ING	ING
Inverkeithing	KY11 1NJ	INK	INK
Inverkip	PA16 0BE	INP	INP
Inverness	IV1 1LF	INV	INV
Inverness Airport	IV2 7JJ	IVA	IVA
Invershin	IV27 4ET	INH	INH
Inverurie	AB51 4TN	INR	INR
Ipswich	IP2 8AN	IPS	IPS
Irlam	M44 5AB	IRL	IRL
Irvine	KA12 8NU	IRV	IRV
Isleworth	TW7 4BY	ISL	ISL
Islip	OX5 2TQ	ISP	ISP
Iver	SL0 9AT	IVR	IVR
Ivybridge	TQ9 5JR	IVY	IVY

== See also ==
- List of heritage railway stations in the United Kingdom
