= List of closed railway stations in Great Britain =

The list of closed railway stations in Great Britain and Isle of Man includes the year of closure if known. Stations reopened as heritage railways continue to be included in this list and some have been linked. Stations listed are those being available to the public thus excluding some private unadvertised stations, military use, railway staff only use or for other specified workmen only e.g.coal miners. Some stations have been reopened to passenger traffic. Some lines are still in use for freight and mineral traffic.

== Lists ==
- List of closed railway stations in London
- List of former and unopened London Underground stations
- List of closed railway stations in Greater Manchester
- List of closed railway stations in Lancashire
- List of railway stations in Merseyside § Closed stations
- List of closed railway stations in Norfolk
- List of closed railway stations in the West Midlands

== See also ==
- Connecting Communities: Expanding Access to the Rail Network, a 2009 report from ATOC detailing 40 commercially viable sites in England for new or reopened stations
