= Bing Maps =

Web mapping service from Microsoft

- Bing Maps (Windows Live Local), showing aerial imagery
- Website type: Web mapping service Virtual globe
- Owner: Microsoft
- Website: www.bing.com/maps
- Launched: 2005; 21 years ago (as Live Search Maps)
- OCLC number: 704290078

Bing Maps (previously Live Search Maps, Windows Live Maps, Windows Live Local, and MSN Virtual Earth) is a web mapping service provided as a part of Microsoft's Bing suite of search engines and powered by the Bing Maps Platform framework which also support Bing Maps for Enterprise APIs and Azure Maps APIs. Since 2020, the map data is provided by TomTom, OpenStreetMap and others.

== History ==
Bing Maps was originally launched as MSN Virtual Earth, which was released for beta testing on July 24, 2005. It was a continuation of previous Microsoft technologies such as Microsoft MapPoint and TerraServer. Its original stand out feature was the aerial imagery. The original version lacked many of its distinguishing features, including birds' eye view and 3D maps, and the Collections functionality was limited to a single "Scratchpad" of points of interest.

In December 2005, Virtual Earth was replaced by Windows Live Local, featuring improvements, technologies from Pictometry International, and integrated with the Local Search index on Windows Live Search (later Microsoft Bing). On November 6, 2006, Microsoft added the ability to view the maps in 3D using a .NET managed control and managed interfaces to Direct3D. Microsoft subsequently referred to this product officially as "Live Search Maps", integrating it as part of its Live Search services.

On June 3, 2009, Microsoft officially rebranded Live Search Maps as Bing Maps, and the Virtual Earth platform as Bing Maps for Enterprise.

In 2010, Microsoft added an OpenStreetMap layer to Bing Maps. From 2012, Nokia (formerly Navteq) powered many aspects of Bing Maps as an extension to its Windows Phone 7 partnership with Microsoft, including mapping data, geocoding, traffic data and navigation.

On June 1, 2020 it was announced the base map data of the Bing Maps Platform would now be sourced from TomTom.

=== Imagery updates ===
Bing maps frequently updates and expands the geographic areas covered by its imagery, with new updates being released on roughly a monthly basis. Each imagery release typically contains more than 10TB of imagery.

The time between image updates means that aerial and Bird's-Eye images of a particular location can sometimes be several years out-of-date. This is particularly noticeable in locations that have undergone recent rapid development or experienced other dramatic changes such as natural disasters since the imagery was taken.

== Features ==
=== Street maps ===
Users can browse and search topographically-shaded street maps for many cities worldwide. Maps include certain points of interest built in, such as metro stations, stadiums, hospitals, and other facilities. It is also possible to browse public user-created points of interest. Searches can cover public collections, businesses or types of businesses, locations, or people. Five street map views are available: Road View, Aerial View, Bird's Eye View, Street Side View, and 3D View.

==== Road view ====
Road view is the default map view and displays vector imagery of roads, buildings, and geography. The data from which the default road map is rendered is licensed from Navteq. In certain parts of the world, road view maps from alternative data providers are also available. For example, when viewing a map of London, the user may see road data from the Collins Bartholomew London Street Map. In all parts of the UK, road data from the Ordnance Survey can also be displayed. A Bing Maps app is available that will display road data from OpenStreetMap.

==== Aerial view ====
Aerial view overlays satellite imagery onto the map and highlights roads and major landmarks for easy identification amongst the satellite images. Since the end of November 2010, OpenStreetMap mappers have been able to use imagery of Bing Aerial as a map background.

At the end of January 2012, both Bing Aerial and Birds Eye View imagery at military bases in Germany became blurred. This was on request of the German government obviously using data from OpenStreetMap.

==== Bird's-eye view ====
Bird's-eye view displayed aerial imagery captured from low-flying aircraft. Unlike the top-down aerial view captured by satellite, Bird's-eye images are taken at an oblique 45-degree angle, and showed the sides and roofs of buildings giving better depth perception for geography. With Bird's Eye views, many details such as signs, advertisements and pedestrians were clearly visible. Microsoft removed this feature from Bing Maps in 2025, along with the Bing Maps street side view and measurement tool. An example of how Aerial View looked is visible on this page's header image.

==== Streetside ====
Bing Maps showing Streetside's view near the Palace of Westminster

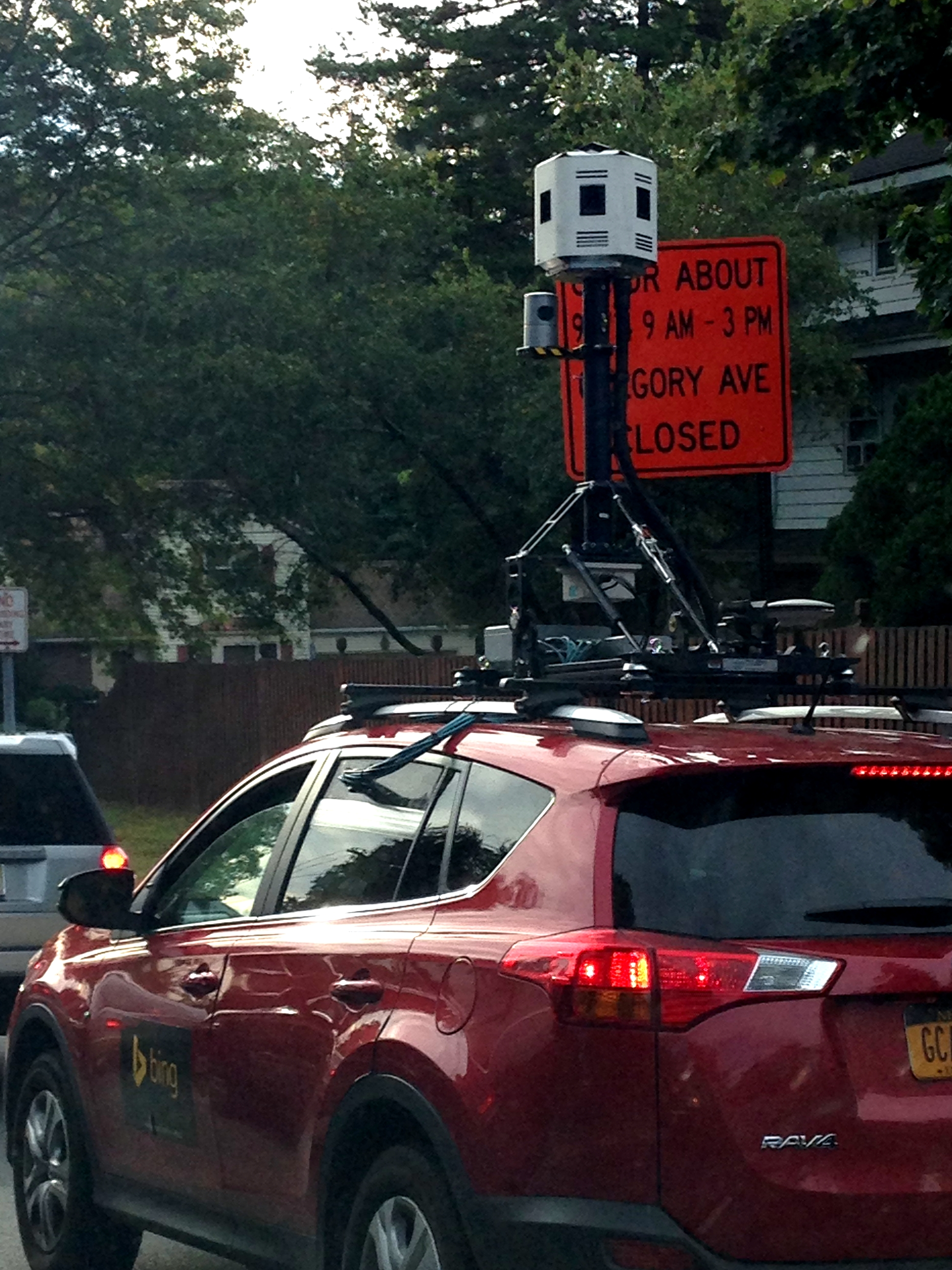
Bing Maps Streetside car with cameras on the roof

Streetside provided 360-degree photos of street-level scenes taken from special cameras mounted on moving vehicles. The Streetside feature was removed from Bing Maps in October 2025, and is no longer accessible. Launched in December 2009 it contained imagery for selected metro areas in the United States as well as selected areas in Vancouver and Whistler, British Columbia associated with the 2010 Winter Olympic Games (example: Richmond Olympic Oval). Selected cities in Europe were also made available in May 2012.
Between August and September 2011, German customers were allowed to appeal against integration of their house or flat in Bing Streetside. According to some officials, the number of appeals was significantly lower than with Google Street View. Only 40,000 requests were sent to Microsoft. In May 2012, Streetside imagery captured in Germany was removed entirely due to numerous requests.
For OpenStreetMap editors, display of Streetside tracks and images can be enabled via a map data layer checkbox.

==== Venue maps ====
Venue maps provide a way of seeing the layout of the venue. Currently, Bing Maps provides maps & level wise layouts of over 5300 venues across the world.
The categories are: Airports, Amusement Parks, Buildings, Convention Centers, Hospitals, Malls, Museums, Parks, Racecourses, Racetracks, Resorts, Shopping Centers, Shopping Districts, Stadiums, Universities and Zoos.

==== 3D maps ====
The 3D maps feature allows users to see the environment (e.g. buildings) in 3D, with the added ability to rotate and tilt the angle in addition to panning and zooming. To attempt to achieve near-photorealism, all 3D buildings are textured using composites of aerial photography. To view the 3D maps, users must install a plugin, then enable the "3D" option on "Bing Maps". In addition to exploring the maps using a mouse and keyboard, it is possible to navigate the 3D environment using an Xbox 360 controller or another game controller in Windows 7, Windows Vista or Windows XP.

More than 60 cities worldwide could be viewed in 3D, including most of the major cities in the United States and a few cities in Canada, the United Kingdom, and France. Some additional cities have had a select few important landmarks modelled in 3D, such as the Colosseum in Rome. Terrain data is available for the entire world. It is also possible to use a 3D modelling program called 3DVIA Shape for Maps to add one's own models to the 3D map. Since 2014, new 3D imagery has been introduced to a number of new cities.

=== Driving, walking, and transit directions ===
Users can get directions between two or more locations. In September 2010, Bing Maps added public transit directions (bus, subway, and local rail) to its available direction options. Although at the beginning it was only available in some cities: Boston, Chicago, Los Angeles, Minneapolis, Newark Metro Area, New York Metro Area, Philadelphia, San Francisco, Seattle, Vancouver BC, and Washington DC, now you can find information from all over the world.

Currently, a wide coverage of transit information is being reached in other countries such as Spain, Germany, Italy, Austria, Brazil, Mexico, Argentina, Colombia and many others.

=== Map apps ===
Bing Map Apps is a collection of 1st and 3rd party applications that add additional functionality and content to Bing Maps. Examples of map apps include a parking finder, a taxi fare calculator, an app that maps out Facebook friends, and an app which lets users explore the day's newspaper front pages from around the world. These apps are only accessible through Bing Maps Silverlight. A source code is available on Microsoft Developer Network to explain integration of Maps in Web Applications. A sample ongoing project on locating Blood Donors on Maps is available here.

=== Traffic information and ClearFlow ===
Bing Maps shows users current traffic information for major highways and roads. The feature uses 4 color codes (black, red, yellow, green) to indicate traffic volume, from heaviest traffic to lightest traffic. Microsoft announced in March 2008 that it will release its latest software technology called "ClearFlow". It is a Web-based service for traffic-based driving directions available on Bing.com in 72 cities across the U.S. The tool took five years for Microsoft's Artificial Intelligence team to develop. ClearFlow provides real-time traffic data to help drivers avoid traffic congestion. ClearFlow gives information for alternative routes and supplies traffic conditions on city streets adjacent to highways. Clearflow anticipates traffic patterns, while taking into account sporting/arena events, time of day and weather conditions, and then reflects the back ups and their consequential spill over onto city streets. Often, ClearFlow found it may be faster to stay on the highway instead of seeking alternative side street routes, which involve traffic lights and congestion as well.

=== Sharing and embedding maps ===
Bing Maps allows users to share maps and embed maps into their websites. By clicking the e-mail icon in the bottom-left corner of Bing Maps, a window will open that displays a shareable URL so others can access the map currently being viewed. This window also provides HTML code to embed a small version of the map onto any web page.

=== Design ===
In August 2010, Bing Maps launched an overhauled design for its default view. The new colors create a more visually appealing backdrop for information delivery that helps content ‘pop’ on the map. The backdrop provides clear differentiation for pushpins, labels and red, yellow and green traffic overlays. These design principles also works well in black and white and creates differentiation for those with the most common forms of color blindness. Also, larger fonts correspond to larger roads to help customers more easily identify main roads in cities. More readable labels eliminate the need for bolding and less-attractive glows. The inclusion of neighborhood labels allows users to quickly find or convey locations in a commonly used and highly relevant format.

== Other features ==
=== People, business, and location search ===
The search box at the top of Bing Maps can be used to locate places, businesses and landmarks, and people. Search results appear both on a left-side rail and as pushpins on the map (linked together by numbers). Search results often include addresses, contact information, and reviews for businesses and landmarks. For relevant searches, the user will also see a description of the landmark or place (powered by Wikipedia) if a Wikipedia article exists. The search process can also be guided using local directories for numerous categories (restaurants, hotels, tourist attractions, retail stores, etc.).

=== User contributions ===
Bing Maps users can also view and add "user contributed" entries to the map. These user-contributions must be toggled on by users. Such items can include businesses, landmarks, buildings, and locations. Users can browse user-contributions by tags and subscribe to RSS feeds to receive updates of new user-contributions to a specific area.

=== Dynamic labels ===
In August 2010, Bing Maps added dynamic labels to its Silverlight experience. Turn on the dynamic labels beta from the map style selector on bing.com/maps/explore and the labels become clickable. This allows users to quickly zoom down to a region or location anywhere on the map with just a few clicks. Zooming back out in a single click is also possible by using the ‘breadcrumb’ trail at the top left of the map.

== AJAX and Silverlight versions ==
Bing Maps has two separate versions for users: an AJAX version (located at Bing.com/Maps) and an opt-in Silverlight version (located at Bing.com/Maps/Explore—not available anymore) that requires Microsoft Silverlight to be installed. The Silverlight version is positioned to offer richer, more dynamic features and a smoother experience. In November 2010, the AJAX and Silverlight versions were combined into a semi-hybrid site where Silverlight features such as Map Apps and Streetside could be enabled through the Bing.com/Maps site - these features still required Silverlight to be installed, but does not require use of a separate Bing Maps site.

On June 30, 2025, the Silverlight version of Bing Maps was discontinued, along with Bing Maps for Enterprise. Customers with the paid version of the API are able to use Bing Maps for Enterprise until June 30, 2028.

== Map apps ==
=== Access ===
Bing Map Apps are accessed either through the "Map Apps" button in the Bing Maps Explore Bar or through direct perma-links. The Map Apps button is only viewable if the user is in the Bing Maps Silverlight experience or in Windows 8.

=== Third-party apps ===
Bing Map Apps also allows third parties to create and submit map apps. The following are a list of 3rd party map apps:

Destination Maps: Create a custom map to a party or place	Everyscape Eats!: Explore 360 degree views of restaurants	Gas Prices: See gas prices for nearby gas stations
GeoSalesTax: View a heat map of sales tax rates in the US	Global Action Atlas: View ongoing global efforts to help people in need and help the environment	DonorsChoose.org: See micro-donation opportunities to help classrooms in need
Oodle Rentals: Find places to rent housing	ParkingFinder: Find parking and get parking rates in major cities	Random Location: Jump to a random location on the map
Ricky's Data Viewer: Import shape files and GSS files to view on Bing Maps	Roadside Sculptures: See sculptures found on US highways	Roadside Attractions: Learn about attractions found along US highways
Seattle Issues: Shows SeeClickFix civil issues in the Seattle area	Signs & Billboards: Unique and noteworthy signs and billboards	Taxi Fare Calculator: Estimate taxi care costs
Today's Front Pages: View the front pages of newspapers from around the globe	TrafficLand: See traffic cameras across the US	Travel Webcams: View webcam feeds at global attractions
Urban Graffiti: Images of graffiti from cities	Urban Murals Wall paintings from urban corridors	Wcities Events: Find local events
WCities Places Nearby: Find nearby hotels, attractions, venues, and restaurants	Weather: See weather conditions and forecasts	Wiki Explorer: Explore the 50 most recent entries to Wiki Places
World of Football: See scores of top European soccer teams		

== Map coverage ==
=== Global Ortho Program ===
In July 2010, Microsoft and DigitalGlobe, a provider of high-resolution earth imagery, announced the collection of the first imagery from the company's Advanced Ortho Aerial Program. Through a special agreement with Microsoft, the Advanced Ortho Aerial Program will provide wall-to-wall 30 cm aerial coverage of the contiguous United States and Western Europe that DigitalGlobe has the exclusive rights to distribute beyond Bing Maps. The program's first orthophoto mosaics are of Augusta, GA, San Diego, CA and Tampa, FL, and can be viewed on DigitalGlobe's website.

=== Americas ===
Country	Navteq Coverage	Bird's Eye	Map POIs
United States	Full	Yes	Yes
Bahamas	Full	No	Yes
Canada	Full	Yes	Yes
Cayman Islands	Full	No	Yes
Mexico	Full	No	Yes
Puerto Rico	Full	No	Yes
Virgin Islands	Full	No	Yes
Argentina	Full	No	Yes
Brazil	Full	No	Yes
Chile	Full	No	Yes
Colombia	Full	No	Named Places & Transportation Hubs
French Guiana	Full	No	No
Guadeloupe	Full	No	No
Martinique	Full	No	No
Saint Barthelemy	Full	No	No
Venezuela	Full	No	Yes
Anguilla	Limited	No	Named Places & Transportation Hubs
Antigua and Barbuda	Limited	No	Named Places & Transportation Hubs
Aruba	Limited	No	Named Places & Transportation Hubs
Barbados	Limited	No	Named Places & Transportation Hubs
Belize	Limited	No	Named Places & Transportation Hubs
Bermuda	Limited	No	Named Places & Transportation Hubs
Bolivia	Limited	No	Named Places & Transportation Hubs
Costa Rica	Limited	No	Named Places & Transportation Hubs
Cuba	Limited	No	Named Places & Transportation Hubs
Dominica	Limited	No	Named Places & Transportation Hubs
Dominican Republic	Limited	No	Named Places & Transportation Hubs
Ecuador	Limited	No	Named Places & Transportation Hubs
El Salvador	Limited	No	Named Places & Transportation Hubs
Falkland Islands (Malvinas)	Limited	No	Named Places & Transportation Hubs
Greenland	Limited	No	Named Places & Transportation Hubs
Grenada	Limited	No	Named Places & Transportation Hubs
Guatemala	Limited	No	Named Places & Transportation Hubs
Guyana	Limited	No	Named Places & Transportation Hubs
Haiti	Limited	No	Named Places & Transportation Hubs
Honduras	Limited	No	Named Places & Transportation Hubs
Jamaica	Limited	No	Named Places & Transportation Hubs
Montserrat	Limited	No	Named Places & Transportation Hubs
Netherlands Antilles	Limited	No	Named Places & Transportation Hubs
Nicaragua	Limited	No	Named Places & Transportation Hubs
Panama	Limited	No	Named Places & Transportation Hubs
Paraguay	Limited	No	Named Places & Transportation Hubs
Peru	Limited	No	Named Places & Transportation Hubs
Saint Kitts and Nevis	Limited	No	Named Places & Transportation Hubs
Saint Lucia	Limited	No	Named Places & Transportation Hubs
Saint Vincent and The Grenadines	Limited	No	Named Places & Transportation Hubs
St. Pierre and Miquelon	Limited	No	Named Places & Transportation Hubs
Suriname	Limited	No	Named Places & Transportation Hubs
Trinidad and Tobago	Limited	No	Named Places & Transportation Hubs
Turks and Caicos Islands	Limited	No	Named Places & Transportation Hubs
Uruguay	Limited	No	Named Places & Transportation Hubs

=== Africa ===
Country	Navteq Coverage	Bird's Eye	Map POIs
Algeria	Limited	No	Named Places & Transportation Hubs
Angola	Limited	No	Named Places & Transportation Hubs
Botswana	Full	No	Yes
Benin	Limited	No	Named Places & Transportation Hubs
Burkina Faso	Limited	No	Named Places & Transportation Hubs
Burundi	Limited	No	Named Places & Transportation Hubs
Cameroon	Limited	No	Named Places & Transportation Hubs
Cape Verde	Limited	No	Named Places & Transportation Hubs
Central African Republic	Limited	No	Named Places & Transportation Hubs
Chad	Limited	No	Named Places & Transportation Hubs
Comoros	Limited	No	Named Places & Transportation Hubs
Congo	Limited	No	Named Places & Transportation Hubs
Côte d'Ivoire	Limited	No	Named Places & Transportation Hubs
Djibouti	Limited	No	Named Places & Transportation Hubs
Equatorial Guinea	Limited	No	Named Places & Transportation Hubs
Eritrea	Limited	No	Named Places & Transportation Hubs
Eswatini	Full	No	Yes
Ethiopia	Limited	No	Named Places & Transportation Hubs
Gabon	Limited	No	Named Places & Transportation Hubs
Gambia	Limited	No	Named Places & Transportation Hubs
Ghana	Limited	No	Named Places & Transportation Hubs
Morocco	Limited	No	Named Places & Transportation Hubs
Guinea-Bissau	Limited	No	Named Places & Transportation Hubs
Kenya	Limited	No	Named Places & Transportation Hubs
Liberia	Limited	No	Named Places & Transportation Hubs
Libyan Arab Jamahiriya	Limited	No	Named Places & Transportation Hubs
Lesotho	Full	No	Yes
Namibia	Full	No	Yes
Madagascar	Limited	No	Named Places & Transportation Hubs
Malawi	Limited	No	Named Places & Transportation Hubs
Mali	Limited	No	Named Places & Transportation Hubs
Mauritania	Limited	No	Named Places & Transportation Hubs
Mauritius	Limited	No	Named Places & Transportation Hubs
Mayotte	Limited	No	Named Places & Transportation Hubs
Mozambique	Limited	No	Named Places & Transportation Hubs
Niger	Limited	No	Named Places & Transportation Hubs
Nigeria	Limited	No	Named Places & Transportation Hubs
Rwanda	Limited	No	Named Places & Transportation Hubs
São Tomé and Príncipe	Limited	No	Named Places & Transportation Hubs
Senegal	Limited	No	Named Places & Transportation Hubs
Seychelles	Limited	No	Named Places & Transportation Hubs
Sierra Leone	Limited	No	Named Places & Transportation Hubs
Somalia	Limited	No	Named Places & Transportation Hubs
South Africa	Full	No	Yes
St. Helena	Limited	No	Named Places & Transportation Hubs
Sudan	Limited	No	Named Places & Transportation Hubs
Tanzania, United Republic of	Limited	No	Named Places & Transportation Hubs
Togo	Limited	No	Named Places & Transportation Hubs
Tunisia	Limited	No	Named Places & Transportation Hubs
Uganda	Limited	No	Named Places & Transportation Hubs
Western Sahara	Limited	No	Named Places & Transportation Hubs
Zambia	Limited	No	Named Places & Transportation Hubs
Zimbabwe	Limited	No	Named Places & Transportation Hubs

=== Europe ===
Country	Navteq Coverage	Bird's Eye	Map POIs
Andorra	Full	No	Yes
Austria	Full	Yes	Yes
Belgium	Full	Yes	Named Places & Transportation Hubs
Croatia	Full	No	Yes
Czech Republic	Full	No	Yes
Denmark	Full	Yes	Yes
Estonia	Full	Yes	Yes
Finland	Full	Yes	Yes
France	Full	Yes	Yes
Germany	Full	Yes	Yes
Gibraltar	Full	Yes	Yes
Greece	Full	Yes	Yes
Guernsey	Full	No	Yes
Hungary	Full	No	Yes
Ireland	Full	Yes	Yes
Isle of Man	Full	No	Yes
Italy	Full	Yes	Yes
Jersey	Full	No	Yes
Latvia	Full	Yes	Yes
Liechtenstein	Full	No	Yes
Lithuania	Full	Yes	Yes
Luxembourg	Full	Yes	Yes
Monaco	Full	Yes	Yes
Netherlands	Full	Yes	Yes
Norway	Full	Yes	Yes
Poland	Full	Yes	Yes
Portugal	Full	Yes	Yes
Russian Federation	Full	No	Yes
San Marino	Full	Yes	Yes
Slovakia	Full	No	Yes
Slovenia	Full	No	Yes
Spain	Full	Yes	Yes
Sweden	Full	Yes	Yes
Switzerland	Full	Yes	Yes
Turkey	Full	No	Yes
United Kingdom	Full	Yes	Yes
Vatican City State	Full	Yes	Yes
Albania	Full	No	Named Places & Transportation Hubs
Belarus	Full	No	Named Places & Transportation Hubs
Bosnia and Herzegowina	Full	No	Named Places & Transportation Hubs
Bulgaria	Full	No	Named Places & Transportation Hubs
Iceland	Full	No	Named Places & Transportation Hubs
North Macedonia	Full	No	Named Places & Transportation Hubs
Moldova, Republic of	Full	No	Named Places & Transportation Hubs
Montenegro	Full	No	Named Places & Transportation Hubs
Romania	Full	Yes	Named Places & Transportation Hubs
Serbia	Full	Yes	Named Places & Transportation Hubs
Azerbaijan	Limited	No	Named Places & Transportation Hubs
Faroe Islands	Limited	No	Named Places & Transportation Hubs
Georgia	Limited	No	Named Places & Transportation Hubs
Armenia	Limited	No	Named Places & Transportation Hubs
Cyprus	Limited	No	Named Places & Transportation Hubs
Malta	Limited	No	Named Places & Transportation Hubs
Svalbard and Jan Mayen Islands	Limited	No	Named Places & Transportation Hubs
Ukraine	Limited	No	Named Places & Transportation Hubs

=== Asia / Oceania ===
Country	Navteq Coverage	Bird's Eye	Map POIs
Brunei	Full	No	Named Places & Transportation Hubs
Japan	Full	Yes	Named Places & Transportation Hubs
Afghanistan	Limited	No	Named Places & Transportation Hubs
American Samoa	Limited	No	Named Places & Transportation Hubs
Bangladesh	Limited	No	Named Places & Transportation Hubs
Bhutan	Limited	No	Named Places & Transportation Hubs
Cambodia	Limited	No	Named Places & Transportation Hubs
China	Limited	No	No
Cook Islands	Limited	No	Named Places & Transportation Hubs
Fiji	Limited	No	Named Places & Transportation Hubs
French Polynesia	Limited	No	Named Places & Transportation Hubs
Guam	Limited	No	Named Places & Transportation Hubs
Kiribati	Limited	No	Named Places & Transportation Hubs
Kyrgyzstan	Limited	No	Named Places & Transportation Hubs
Lao People's Democratic Republic	Limited	No	Named Places & Transportation Hubs
Maldives	Limited	No	Named Places & Transportation Hubs
Marshall Islands	Limited	No	Named Places & Transportation Hubs
Micronesia, Federated States of	Limited	No	Named Places & Transportation Hubs
Mongolia	Limited	No	Named Places & Transportation Hubs
Myanmar	Limited	No	Named Places & Transportation Hubs
Nauru	Limited	No	Named Places & Transportation Hubs
Nepal	Limited	No	Named Places & Transportation Hubs
New Caledonia	Limited	No	Named Places & Transportation Hubs
Niue	Limited	No	Named Places & Transportation Hubs
Norfolk Island	Limited	No	Named Places & Transportation Hubs
North Korea	Limited	No	Named Places & Transportation Hubs
Northern Mariana Islands	Limited	No	Named Places & Transportation Hubs
Pakistan	Limited	No	Named Places & Transportation Hubs
Palau	Limited	No	Named Places & Transportation Hubs
Papua New Guinea	Limited	No	Named Places & Transportation Hubs
Philippines	Limited	No	Named Places & Transportation Hubs
Solomon Islands	Limited	No	Named Places & Transportation Hubs
South Korea	Limited	No	Named Places & Transportation Hubs
Sri Lanka	Limited	No	Named Places & Transportation Hubs
Tajikistan	Limited	No	Named Places & Transportation Hubs
Timor-Leste	Limited	No	Named Places & Transportation Hubs
Tonga	Limited	No	Named Places & Transportation Hubs
Turkmenistan	Limited	No	Named Places & Transportation Hubs
Tuvalu	Limited	No	Named Places & Transportation Hubs
Uzbekistan	Limited	No	Named Places & Transportation Hubs
Vanuatu	Limited	No	Named Places & Transportation Hubs
Vietnam	Limited	No	Named Places & Transportation Hubs
Wallis and Futuna Islands	Limited	No	Named Places & Transportation Hubs
Australia	Full	Yes	Named Places & Transportation Hubs
Hong Kong	Limited	No	Yes
India	Full	Yes	Yes
Indonesia	Limited	No	Yes
Macau	Limited	No	Yes
Malaysia	Limited	No	Yes
New Zealand	Limited	Yes	Yes
Singapore	Limited	No	Yes
Taiwan	Limited	No	Yes
Thailand	Limited	No	Yes

=== Middle East ===
Country	Navteq Coverage	Bird's Eye	Map POIs
Bahrain	Full	No	Yes
Kuwait	Full	No	Yes
Oman	Full	No	Yes
Qatar	Full	No	Yes
Saudi Arabia	Full	No	Yes
United Arab Emirates	Full	No	Yes
Iran	Limited	No	Named Places & Transportation Hubs
Iraq	Limited	No	Named Places & Transportation Hubs
Israel	Limited	No	Named Places & Transportation Hubs
Lebanon	Limited	No	Named Places & Transportation Hubs
Syria	Limited	No	Named Places & Transportation Hubs
Yemen	Limited	No	Named Places & Transportation Hubs
Jordan	Full	No	No
Reunion	Full	No	No
Egypt	Limited	No	No

== Compatibility ==
Microsoft states that Bing Maps needs the following environment:

- Windows XP with SP2 or a later version
- Microsoft .NET Framework 2.0
- Windows Imaging Component
- 250 MB or more of hard disk space
- A 1.0-gigahertz (GHz) processor (2.8 GHz or faster is recommended)
- 256 MB of system memory (1 GB is recommended)
- A 32-MB video card (256 MB is recommended) that supports Microsoft DirectX 9, with 3D hardware acceleration enabled
- A high-speed or broadband Internet connection

Compatible browsers include Windows Internet Explorer 6 or later, Mozilla Firefox 3.0 or later, or Safari 3.1 or later. Opera is stated to be usable "with some functionality limitations". Users of browsers that are not considered compatible, as well as users of versions of compatible browsers that are not supported, will be directed away from viewing the map without an error message.

The 3D Maps viewer plug-in requires Microsoft Windows XP Service Pack 2, Microsoft Windows Server 2003, Windows Vista, or Windows 7 with Internet Explorer 6/7/8 or Firefox 1.5/2.0/3.0.

== See also ==
- Apple Maps – Map application operated by Apple
- Azure Maps – Geographic information system maintained by Microsoft
- Google Earth – 3D Internet global map program
- Google Maps – Web mapping service
- Here WeGo – Web mapping and navigation service since 2012
- MapQuest – American free online mapping service
- OpenStreetMap – Collaborative map database
- Tencent Maps – Chinese desktop and web mapping service application
- Yahoo! Maps – Website
