= Abermorddu =

Village in Flintshire, Wales

Coordinates: 53.104°N 3.033°W

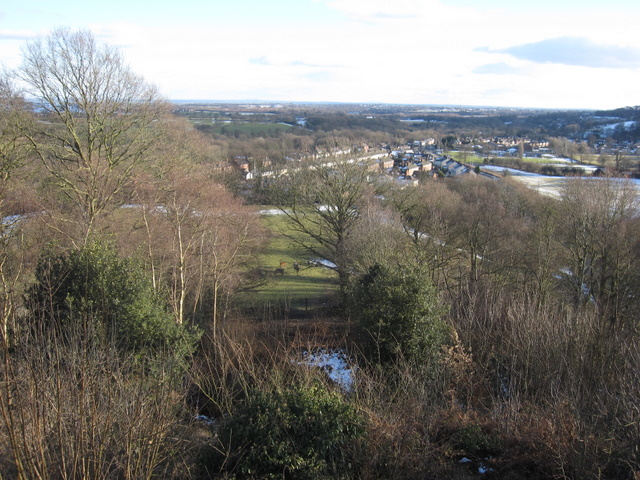
- View over Abermorddu from Caergwrle Castle

- Location within Flintshire
- OS grid reference: SJ307568
- Principal area: Flintshire
- Preserved county: Clwyd
- Country: Wales
- Sovereign state: United Kingdom
- Post town: WREXHAM
- Postcode district: LL12
- Dialling code: 01978
- Police: North Wales
- Fire: North Wales
- Ambulance: Welsh
- UK Parliament: Alyn and Deeside
- Senedd Cymru – Welsh Parliament: Alyn and Deeside

Abermorddu (Welsh pronunciation) is a village in the county of Flintshire, Wales, in the community of Hope. Approximately 5 miles north of Wrexham along the A541 road, it is contiguous with the main village of Caergwrle and closely related to the village of Hope. In the 19th century there was a turnpike road known as Abermorddu Branch running from the tollhouse at King's Ferry to Abermorddu.

Its name probably comes from the confluence (aber) of a small brook called Morddu with the River Alyn.

== Landmarks ==
Abermorddu Primary School, although originally in the village, has for the many decades had its site in Cefn-y-bedd, whilst the local secondary school is in nearby Hope.

To the northwest along the A541 is the ruins of Caergwrle Castle. It was probably built by Dafydd ap Gruffydd after being given land by Edward I of England after his initial conquest of Wales in 1277. It was damaged by the Welsh in 1282, and ceded to John of Cromwell in 1308 to rebuild it, but by 1335 it was in ruins and has remained as such.

A new housing estate has sprung up in the village at Parc Celyn. The estate, with three and four bedroom houses, lies off Cymau lane, next to Abermorddu Primary School.

Close to the housing estate is believed to be the remains of a Bronze Age burial chamber although the site is likely to be merely a barrow cemetery. A street in the estate is named "Llys Cromlech" (Cromlech)/Dolmen Court) in testament to the prehistoric activity in the vicinity.
