= Caergwrle Bowl =

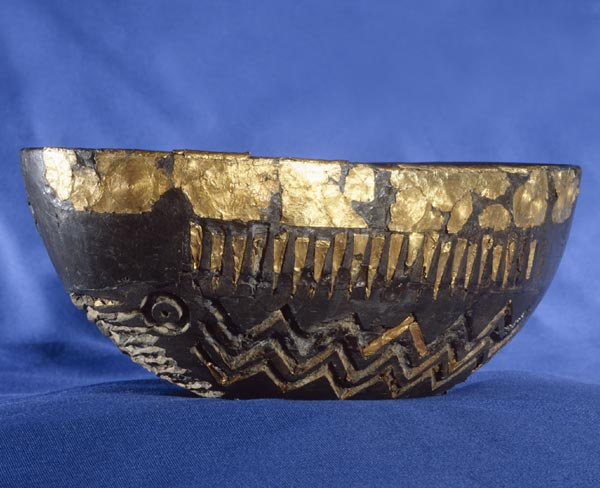
The Caergwrle Bowl

The Caergwrle Bowl is a unique object dating to the Middle Bronze Age, c. 1300 BC, originally manufactured from shale, tin and gold, and found in Caergwrle, Flintshire, north east Wales. It is thought to represent a boat, with its applied gold decoration signifying oars and waves, and either sun discs or circular shields. At both ends of the boat is a pair of oculi or 'eyes'.

== Construction and history ==
The Caergwrle Bowl may represent a mythological solar boat. Similarities have been noted with contemporary miniature gold boats from Nors in Denmark, which also bear circular solar symbols, and with the later Broighter gold boat from Ireland. The Caergwrle bowl has been compared to the earlier Nebra sky disc from Germany, which is thought to depict a solar boat, possibly in the form of a bowl. The gold cape from Mold, which dates from the same period as the Nebra sky disc, was found near to Caergwrle. Gold lunulae from the Early Bronze Age Bell Beaker culture, including examples from Wales, have also been interpreted as representations of solar boats. The zig-zag 'waves' on the Caergwrle bowl further resemble decorations on some Bell Beaker bowls.

Depictions of oculi on boats are also known from ancient Greece. In Ancient Greek poetry and art the 'Sun's vessel' is often depicted as a gold bowl, cup or cauldron that sails or flies across the sea. Both Early Bronze Age gold cups and Late Bronze Age cauldrons from Britain and Ireland have been connected archaeologically and culturally to similar artefacts from Greece.

Gold bowls from the Eberswalde Hoard in Germany and from the Nordic Bronze Age also bear circular solar symbols. The symbols on the Eberswalde bowls are thought to represent lunisolar calendars. Similar symbols are found on the Berlin Gold Hat which are thought to represent a lunisolar calendar based on the 19-year Metonic cycle.

== Discovery and restoration ==
The incomplete bowl was found in 1823 by a workman digging a drain in a field below Caergwrle Castle. It was donated to the National Museum Wales in 1912, and sent to the British Museum for restoration where it was originally reconstructed from wax with the decoration attached by an adhesive. Since then the bowl has been rebuilt again as the first conservation failed to be stable.

== See also ==
- Battersea Cauldron
- Hochdorf Chieftain's Grave
