= Flint Town Hall =

Municipal Building in Flint, Wales

- Neuadd y Dref Y Fflint (Welsh)
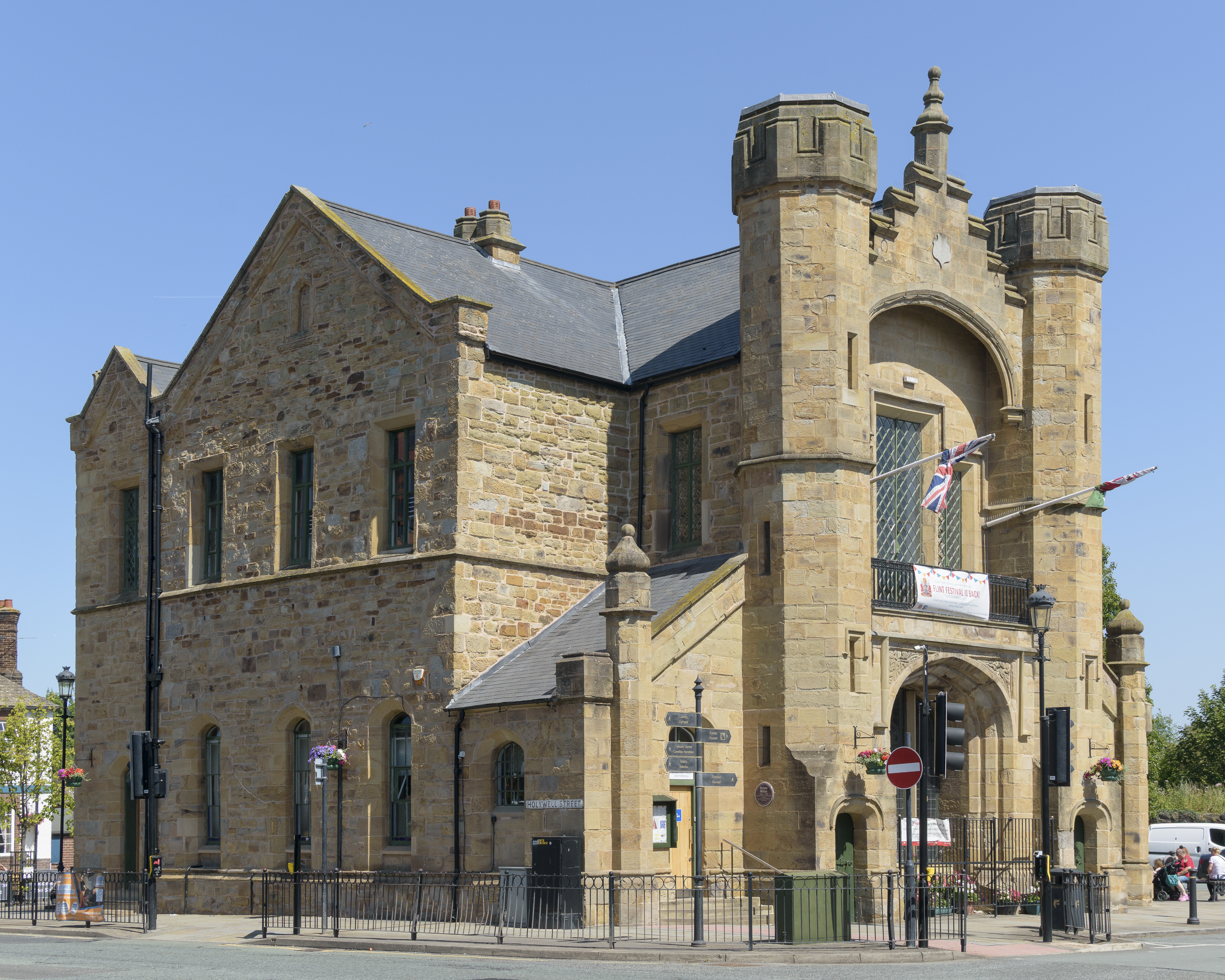
- Flint Town Hall in 2025

- Shown in Flintshire
- 53.2500°N 3.1337°W
- Location: Market Square, Flint

History
- Built: 1840

Site notes
- Architect: John Welch
- Architectural style: Gothic Revival style

Listed Building – Grade II
- Official name: Town Hall
- Designated: 5 December 1972
- Reference no.: 14891

Flint Town Hall (Welsh: Neuadd y Dref Y Fflint) is a municipal structure in the Market Square, Flint, Flintshire, Wales. The town hall, which is the meeting place of Flint Town Council, is a Grade II listed building.

== History ==
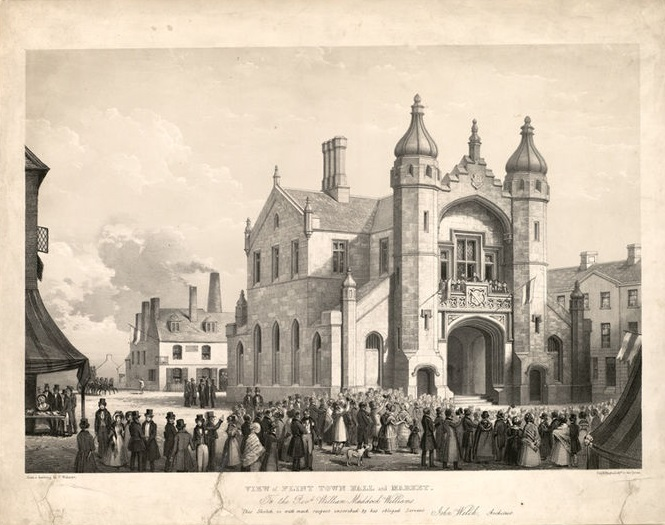
View of the current town hall shortly after it was built in 1840

The first municipal building in Flint was a half timbered town hall which was completed in the early 16th century. After the old building became dilapidated, civic leaders decided to demolish it and to erect a new town hall, financed by public subscription, in its place.

The new building was designed by John Welch in the Gothic Revival style, built in ashlar stone at a cost of £1,734 and was completed in February 1840. The design involved a symmetrical main frontage with three bays facing onto the Market Square; the central bay, which was projected forward, originally featured an arched doorway on the ground floor; there was a Venetian window with a balcony and a wrought-iron balustrade on the first floor, and an archway, a stepped gable and a stone finial above. The central bay was flanked by full-height castellated turrets. The outer bays were represented by the side elevations of two lean-to wings. Internally, the principal rooms were the council chamber, which featured a hammerbeam roof made from timbers recovered from the first town hall, and the mayor's parlour. The mayor's parlour was decorated at the expense of one of the burgesses, Ross Mahon, by fifteen panels, painted by Joseph Hall and depicting the Fifteen Tribes of Wales.

Flint was an ancient borough. Like most such boroughs it was reformed under the Municipal Corporations Act 1835 to become a municipal borough. The town hall served as the borough council's headquarters. The building also continued to be used for judicial purposes: both the county court and petty session hearings were held there. Six stained glass windows, designed by a Mr Drewitt depicting the six monarchs who had granted the town its charters, were installed in the council chamber in 1886. Representatives of the 384th (Royal Welch Fusiliers) Anti-Tank Regiment, Royal Artillery attended the town hall to receive the freedom of the borough in August 1947.

When Flintshire County Council was established in 1889, it initially held its meetings in rotation between Mold, Rhyl and the town hall in Flint until the early twentieth century, before deciding to base itself solely in Mold.

The building continued to serve as the headquarters of the Flint Borough Council until 1966, when a new building called Guildhall was built at the corner of Chapel Street and Church Street. Following local government reorganisation in 1974, the new guildhall passed to the successor Delyn Borough Council. The town hall became the meeting place of Flint Town Council, a lower-tier community council. An extensive programme of refurbishment words, which included restoration of the façade of the building, to a design by Donald Insall Associates, was completed in 2015.

A purple plaque commemorating the life of Eirene White, Baroness White, the former member of parliament for East Flintshire, was unveiled outside near the entrance on 10 June 2022.

Works of art in the town hall include portraits by Thomas Leonard Hughes of King Richard II, (Note: The portrait of Richard II is based on a similar depiction of the king in Westminster Abbey.) and of Sir Roger Mostyn, 1st Baronet. Richard II surrendered to Henry Bolingbroke at Flint Castle in August 1399, promising to abdicate the throne if his life was spared, while Mostyn defended Flint Castle on behalf of the Royalists against the besieging Parliamentary forces in August 1646 during the English Civil War. There is also a painting by Hector Giacomelli of a scene from William Shakespeare's play The Merchant of Venice.
