= Hope Mountain =

Hill in Flintshire, Wales

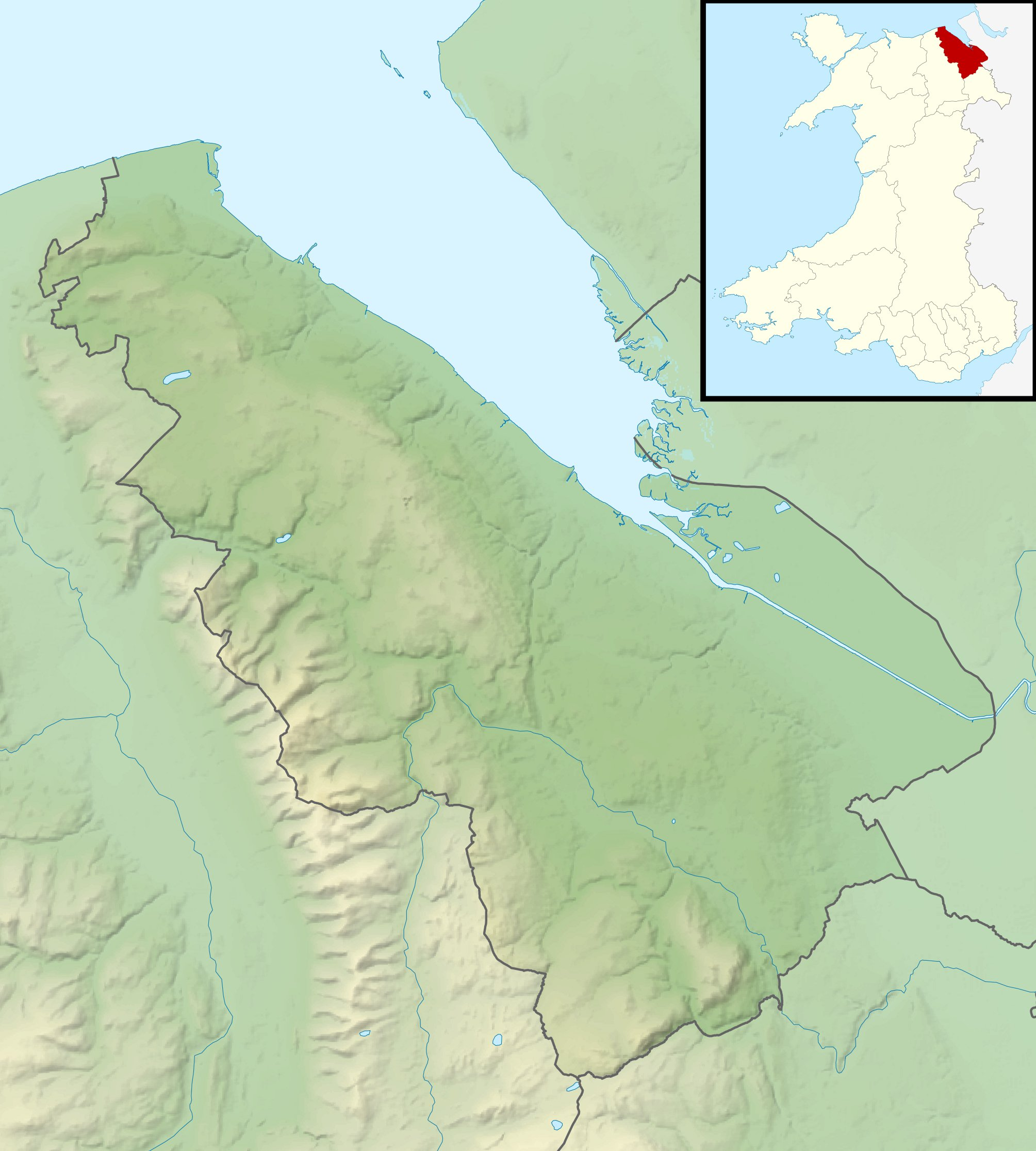
- Location within Flintshire

Highest point
- Elevation: 330 m (1,080 ft)
- Prominence: 187
- Listing: Marilyns in the British Isles
- Coordinates: 53°06′16″N 03°03′17″W

Geography
- Country: Wales
- County: Flintshire
- Village: Caergwrle

Hope Mountain is a Marilyn located by the village of Caergwrle in North Wales. It features a park at the top named Llyn-y-Waun and is located directly below the flight paths from Hawarden Airport. People often gather here to view the planes flying overhead fairly low.

The mountain is surrounded by other hills including Caergwrle Castle hill and Bryn-y-Gae. Bryn Iorcyn, a 17th-century stone building, is located on the east-facing side of the mountain.

The southern slope of the mountain was historically used as a limestone quarry.
