= Hope, Flintshire =

Village and community in Flintshire, Wales

Hope: Welsh: Yr Hôb
- Village and community
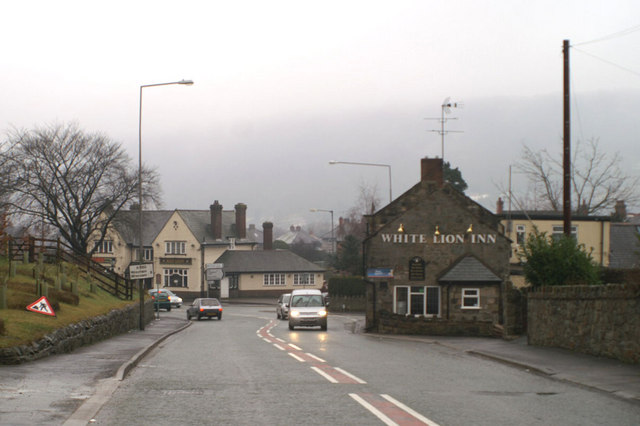
- The Red Lion and White Lion on the road into Hope

- Location within Flintshire
- Population: 4,224 (2011 Census)
- OS grid reference: SJ30705723
- Principal area: Flintshire
- Preserved county: Clwyd
- Country: Wales
- Sovereign state: United Kingdom
- Post town: WREXHAM
- Postcode district: LL12
- Dialling code: 01978
- Police: North Wales
- Fire: North Wales
- Ambulance: Welsh
- UK Parliament: Alyn and Deeside
- Senedd Cymru – Welsh Parliament: Alyn and Deeside; Delyn
- Website: Council website
- List of places UK Wales Flintshire 53.10774°N 3.03664°W Map of the community

Hope (Welsh: Yr Hôb) is a small village and community in Flintshire, north-east Wales. The village is located approximately 3 miles (4.8 km) from the Wales-England border, on the course of the River Alyn, and less than 5 miles from Wrexham.

Hope is one of several villages including Caergwrle, Abermorddu and Cefn-y-bedd which together form the community. At the 2001 Census, community the population was 2,522, increasing to 4,224 at the 2011 Census partly due to boundary changes. One of the major features in the area is Hope Mountain (Mynydd yr Hob), to the west of the village.

== History ==
Yr Hob was originally the name of a commote within the cantref of Maelor in the medieval Kingdom of Powys. Both the Welsh and English language names are derived from an Old English word hop meaning "enclosed land in a marsh", a relic of Mercian settlement in the area.

In 1086, when the Domesday Book was compiled, Hope was listed as a very small settlement and it was within the hundred of Exestan and the county of Cheshire.

The old parish of Hope was once divided into two parts by the River Alyn. One part, called Hope Medachied, was made up of the townships of Uwchmynydd, Cymau, Caergwrle and Rhanberfedd: the other was made of Hope Owen, Estyn and Shordley. In 1843 a large area of Hope Medachied was transferred to the new parish of Llanfynydd.

The old parish, also known as "St Cyngar’s Church" in Hope, is built on top of an ancient “llan” - a raised circular Celtic enclosure. Suggesting that long before the Norman stone church was built, the site was already a site of Christian worship that pre-dates the 12th Century church.

The village's long association with neighbouring Caergwrle has given rise to the local expression "Live in Hope, die in Caergwrle".

== Facilities ==
The English-medium secondary school Castell Alun High is located in the village.

Hope has good transport links with local towns and cities, notably Wrexham, Chester and Mold, with the Borderlands Line running directly through Hope railway station giving access to Liverpool via the Wirral Peninsula.

Hope has a library, a sports centre and football, cricket and rugby union clubs. The Castell Alun Colts Football Club play in the Welsh Football League system and are affiliated to the Football Association of Wales and the North East Wales Football Association. At present (2024/25 season) they play in the North East Wales Premier Division, the fourth level on the Welsh Football League pyramid.

In 2017, work began on a community project to build a replica of a Roman fort in a disused quarry in the village. The project known as "Park in the Past" is set to become a centre for education and leisure activities.

== Governance ==
An electoral ward of the same name exists, which covers the village of Hope and elects one county councillor to Flintshire County Council. This ward had a population of 2,605 at the 2011 census.

== See also ==
- Hope Hall
