= Cefn-y-bedd =

Village in Flintshire, Wales

Coordinates: 53.099°N 3.031°W

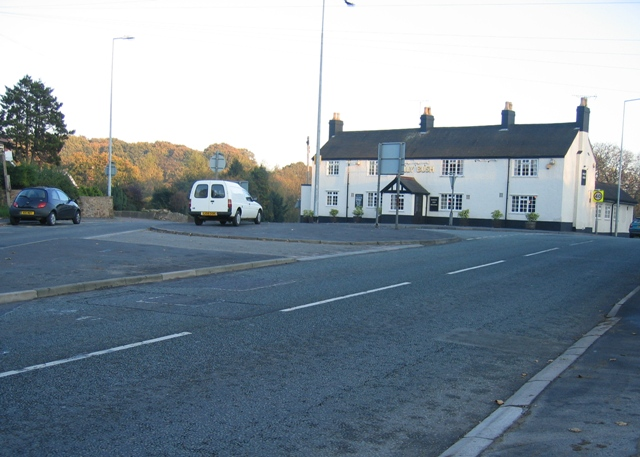
- The Hollybush public house, Cefn-y-Bedd

- Location within Flintshire
- OS grid reference: SJ310563
- Principal area: Flintshire
- Preserved county: Clwyd
- Country: Wales
- Sovereign state: United Kingdom
- Post town: WREXHAM
- Postcode district: LL12
- Dialling code: 01978
- Police: North Wales
- Fire: North Wales
- Ambulance: Welsh
- UK Parliament: Alyn and Deeside
- Senedd Cymru – Welsh Parliament: Alyn and Deeside

Cefn-y-bedd (Welsh pronunciation) is a village in Flintshire, north-east Wales.

The name translates into English as "the ridge of the grave", in reference to an old tumulus which a local tale said was the burial place of Gwrle Gawr, the legendary figure after whom Caergwrle was said to be named.

Cefn-y-bedd is on the A541 road to the south of its junction with the A550 road at Abermorddu. The village is served by Cefn-y-Bedd railway station on the Borderlands Line, linking Wrexham and Bidston on the Wirral Peninsula.

It is in the community of Llanfynydd, Flintshire.
