= Caergwrle =

Village in Flintshire, Wales

Coordinates: 53.1102°N 3.0406°W

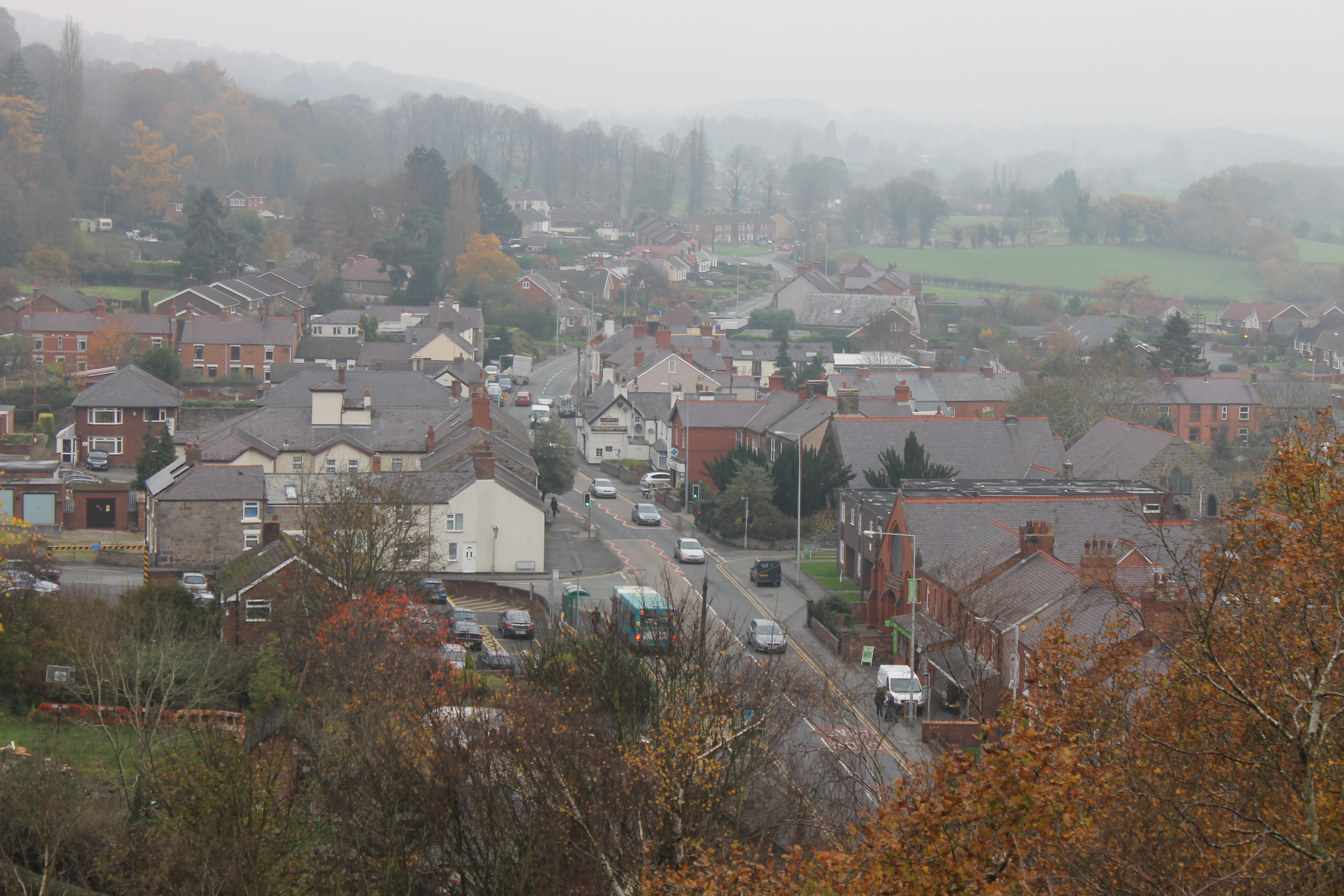
- Caergwrle's High Street from the castle

- Location within Flintshire
- Population: 1,619 (Ward, 2011)
- OS grid reference: SJ303575
- Community: Hope
- Principal area: Flintshire
- Preserved county: Clwyd
- Country: Wales
- Sovereign state: United Kingdom
- Post town: WREXHAM
- Postcode district: LL12
- Dialling code: 01978
- Police: North Wales
- Fire: North Wales
- Ambulance: Welsh
- UK Parliament: Alyn and Deeside
- Senedd Cymru – Welsh Parliament: Alyn and Deeside; Delyn

Caergwrle (Welsh pronunciation) is a village in the county of Flintshire, in north east Wales. Approximately 5–6 miles (8.0–9.7 km) from Wrexham and situated on the A541 road, it is contiguous with the villages of Abermorddu and Hope, though in parts Caergwrle and Hope are separated by a river border. The village lies on the River Alyn and sits at the base of Hope Mountain. At the 2001 Census, the population was 1,650. The population was subsequently absorbed in the community of Hope and only the electoral ward remained. The population of this ward as taken at the 2011 census was 1,619. The ward includes the area of Abermorddu. Further south is the village of Cefn-y-Bedd.

== Origins of name ==
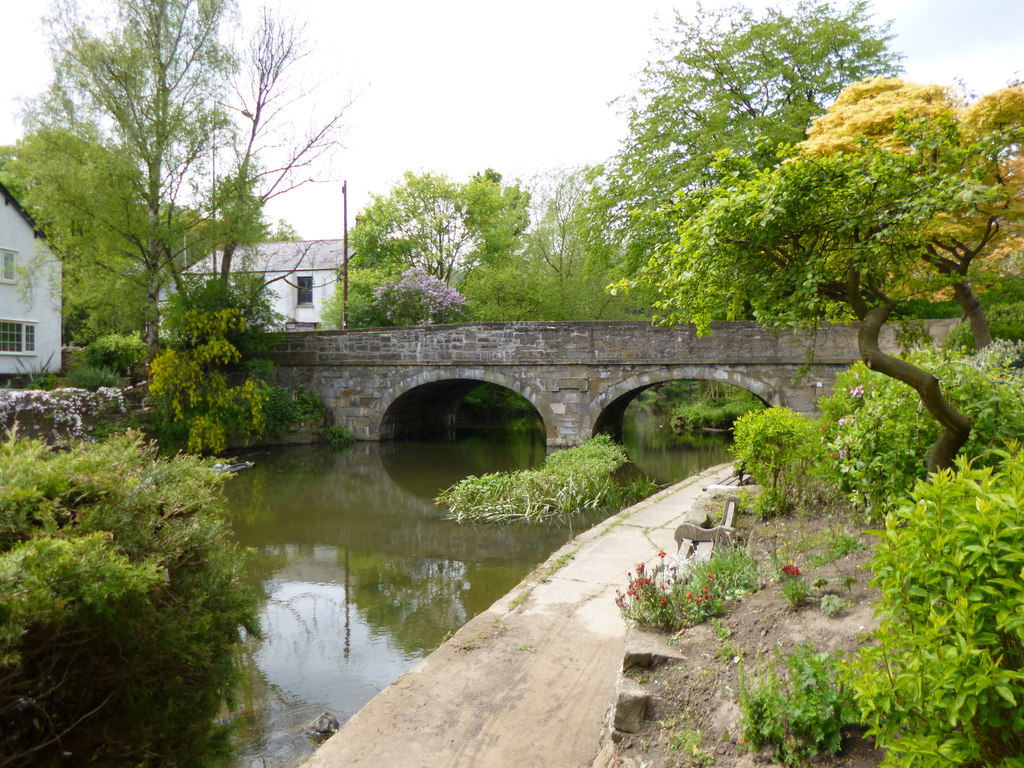
Caergwrle Bridge on the River Alyn

The name Caergwrle derives from the Welsh caer 'fort' and a lost English placename *Corley 'river meadow of the crane'. Folk etymology explained the name by means of a cawr ('giant') named Gwrle, who was supposed to have lived in nearby Caergwrle Castle and to have been buried in the nearby Neolithic burial mound at Cefn-y-bedd.

== Caergwrle Castle ==
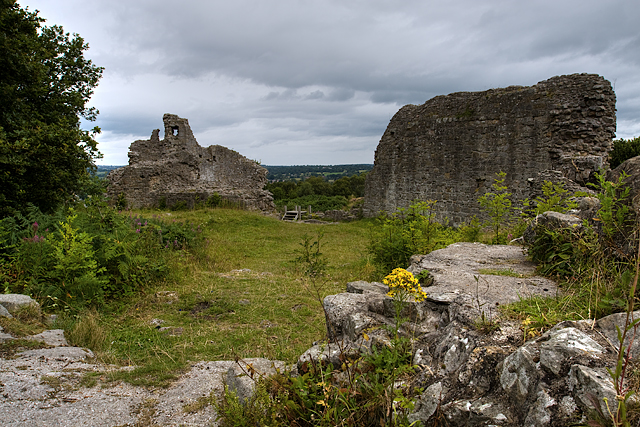
Caergwrle Castle

The 13th-century, ruined Caergwrle Castle, also sometimes known as Queen's Hope Castle, was first built by Tywysog (Prince) Dafydd ap Gruffydd, in lands agreed with Edward I of England during his invasion of Wales in 1277. Dafydd, in agreeing not to resist the invasion, had extensive improvements made to his castle at Edward's expense. In 1282 however, Dafydd bought his time and raised the banner of revolt, marching on Hawarden Castle controlled by Edward's invaders. Dafydd and his men seized the castle.

When Dafydd was executed on 3 October 1283 by King Edward I, Edward took control of the castle, and gave it to his Queen, Eleanor of Castile, which prompted the name Queen's Hope.

== Other features of Caergwrle ==
The 17th-century Packhorse Bridge, which is reputed to be haunted, was nearly destroyed by flooding in 2000, though it has since been restored. There have been many other developments and restorations in Caergwrle.

Caergwrle was also home to a Welsh International football player George Alfred Godding who played from 17 March 1923 to 14 April 1923 with two caps for Wales.

Caergwrle's long association with the adjacent village of Hope has given rise to a well-known local joke: "Live in Hope, die in Caergwrle". This was already described as an "old saying" in the 19th century, when it was recorded by the antiquarian John Askew Roberts.

== Religious and cultural link to India ==
In 1863 a missionary from northeast India died in the village. U Larsing (also known as Larsing Khongwir), was a Khasi evangelist from the Khasi Hills of India. He was buried locally before his remains were later transferred to Chester. A memorial stone bearing inscriptions in both English and Welsh was placed in his honour, and is now a Grade II listed monument.

== Transport ==
=== Rail ===
The service on the Borderlands line from Wrexham Central to Bidston passes through Caergwrle railway station. Bidston provides a connection to Liverpool via the Wirral Line. Caergwrle railway station is managed by Transport for Wales.

=== Bus ===
Caergwrle has bus links giving access to Mold, Broughton, Wrexham and Chester.

== The Caergwrle Bowl ==
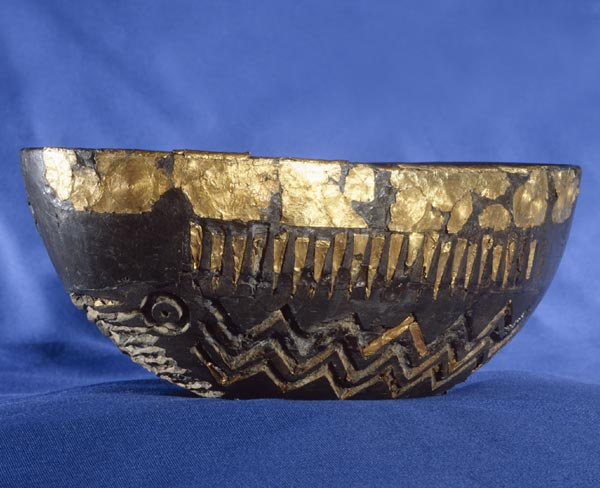
The Caergwrle Bowl.

The Caergwrle Bowl is a unique object dating to the Middle Bronze Age, c. 1300 BC, originally manufactured from shale, tin and gold. It is thought to represent a boat, with its applied gold decoration signifying oars and waves, and either sun discs or circular shields. Some researchers have suggested that the Caergwrle Bowl represents a mythological solar boat. Similarities have been noted with the contemporary miniature gold boats from Nors in Denmark, and with the later Broighter gold boat from Ireland. The Caergwrle bowl has also been related to the earlier Nebra sky disc from Germany, which is thought to depict a solar boat. Gold lunulae from the Early Bronze Age Beaker culture, including examples from Wales, have also been interpreted as representations of solar boats. The gold cape from Mold, which dates from the same period as the Nebra sky disc, was found near to Caergwrle.

The incomplete bowl was found in 1823 by a workman digging a drain in a field below Caergwrle Castle. It was donated to the National Museum Wales in 1912, and sent to the British Museum for restoration where it was originally reconstructed from wax with the decoration attached by an adhesive. Since then the bowl has been rebuilt again as the first conservation failed to be stable.
