= Barry Jones, Baron Jones =

British politician

The Right Honourable The Lord Jones PC
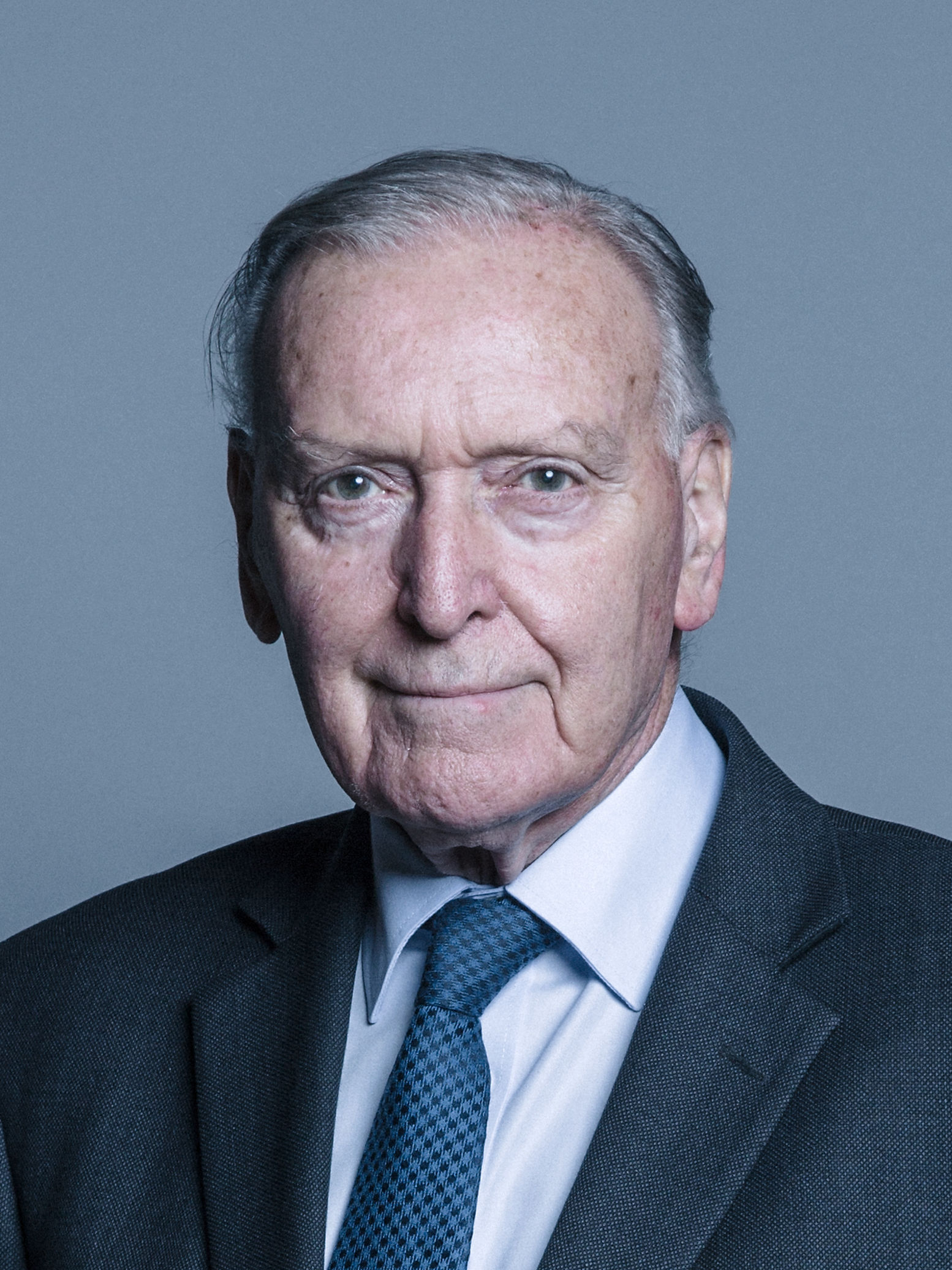
- Official portrait, 2018

Shadow Secretary of State for Wales
- In office 9 January 1989 – 18 July 1992
- Leader: Neil Kinnock
- Preceded by: Alan Williams
- Succeeded by: Ann Clwyd
- In office 31 October 1983 – 13 July 1987
- Leader: Neil Kinnock
- Preceded by: Denzil Davies
- Succeeded by: Alan Williams

Member of Parliament for Alyn and Deeside East Flintshire (1970–1983)
- In office 18 June 1970 – 14 May 2001
- Preceded by: Eirene White
- Succeeded by: Mark Tami

Member of the House of Lords
- Lord Temporal
- Life peerage 6 July 2001

Personal details
- Born: 26 June 1938 (age 88)
- Party: Labour

Stephen Barry Jones, Baron Jones PC (born 26 June 1938) is a British Labour Party politician who served as a Member of Parliament (MP) from 1970 to 2001, and since then as a life peer.

== Early life ==
Jones was educated at Hawarden Grammar School and Bangor College of Education. A teacher, he was president of the Flint County National Union of Teachers. He also served for two years in the Royal Welsh Fusiliers.

== Political career ==
Jones first stood for Parliament in Northwich in 1966, without success, although he reduced the Conservative majority from 4,385 to 703. He was the Member of Parliament (MP) for East Flintshire from 1970 to 1983.

He was a parliamentary under-secretary of state for Wales from 1974 to 1979, and became MP for Alyn and Deeside in 1983.

In 1994, Jones was appointed by the Prime Minister as a member of the then new Intelligence and Security Committee, on which he served until 2001; when the Committee was dissolved at that year's general election, Jones retired from the House of Commons and was made a life peer with the title Baron Jones, of Deeside in the County of Clwyd, as was Dale Campbell-Savours, who had served on the Committee since 1997. Jones was replaced as Alyn and Deeside MP by Mark Tami.

In the 1999 Queen's Birthday Honours, Jones was made a member of the Privy Council of the United Kingdom.

== Other positions ==
In 2007 he was elected as President of NEWI (Glyndŵr University). He was installed as Chancellor of the university in 2009.

Lord Jones was elected vice president of the charity Attend in 2013 and currently holds this position.

He was also appointed and currently holds the title of President of the Deeside Business Forum, a business advocacy forum for companies based on Deeside Industrial Park.

Lord Jones currently holds the title of President of the Army Cadet Force Association Wales,

As of 2023, Lord Jones was also appointed President to 2247 (Hawarden) Squadron, Air Training Corps.

President on Connah's Quay unit 91 of the sea cadet corps

== Personal life ==
Jones is a fan of Everton Football Club.

Parliament of the United Kingdom
Preceded by Eirene White	Member of Parliament for East Flintshire; 1970–1983	Constituency abolished
New constituency	Member of Parliament for Alyn and Deeside; 1983–2001	Succeeded by Mark Tami
Orders of precedence in the United Kingdom
Preceded by The Lord MacGregor of Pulham Market	Gentlemen; Baron Jones	Followed by The Lord King of Bridgwater
