= Flint, Flintshire =

Town and community in Flintshire, Wales

Flint: Welsh: Y Fflint
- Town and community
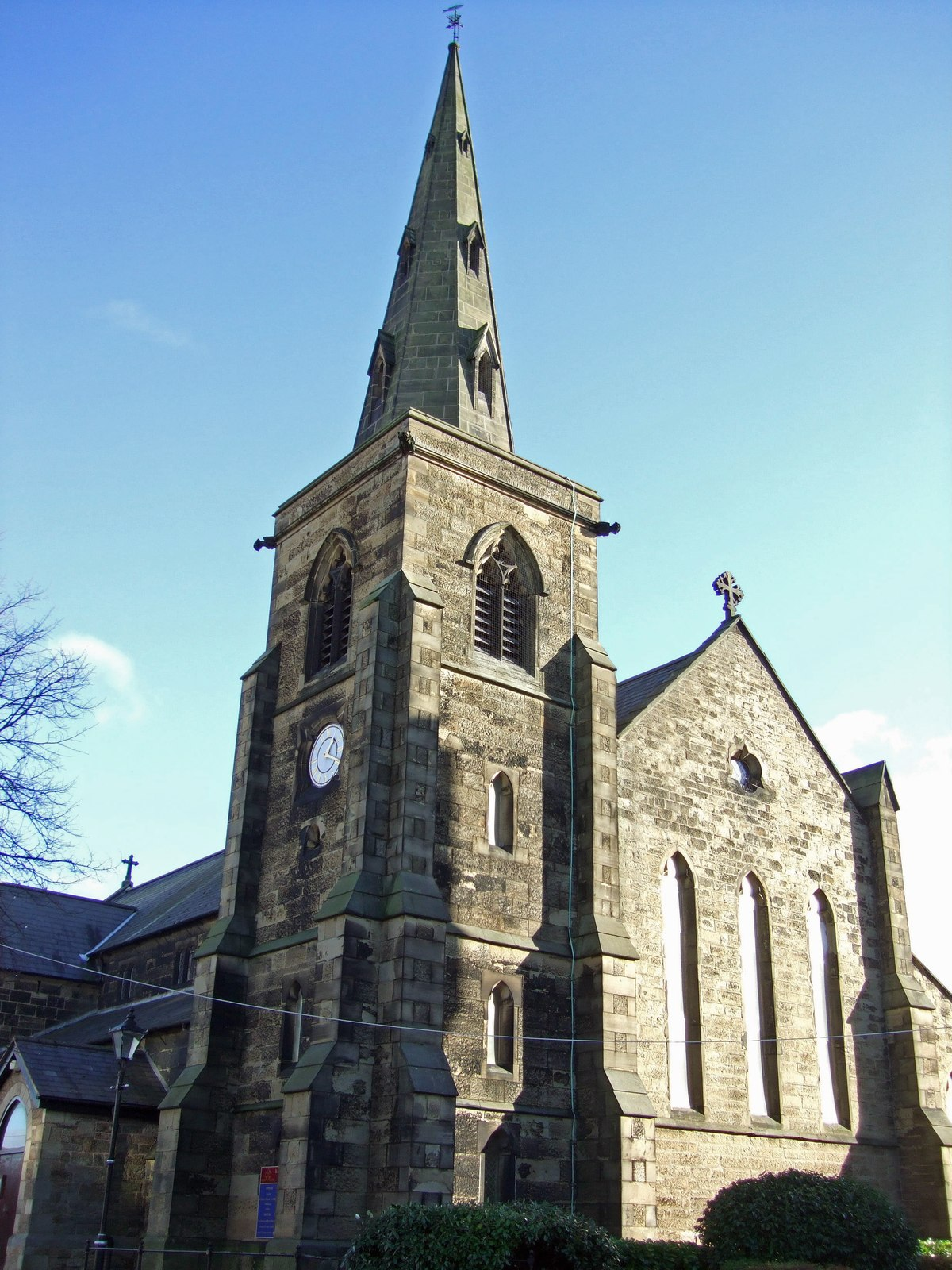
- St Mary's Church, Church Street

- Location within Flintshire
- Population: 13,736 (2021)
- OS grid reference: SJ243729
- Community: Flint
- Principal area: Flintshire
- Preserved county: Clwyd
- Country: Wales
- Sovereign state: United Kingdom
- Settlements: List: Flint; Flint Mountain; Oakenholt
- Post town: FLINT
- Postcode district: CH6
- Dialling code: 01352
- Police: North Wales
- Fire: North Wales
- Ambulance: Welsh
- UK Parliament: Alyn and Deeside
- Senedd Cymru – Welsh Parliament: Delyn
- Website: Town council website
- List of places UK Wales Flintshire 53.2482°N 3.1358°W Map of the community

Flint (Welsh: Y Fflint) is a town and community in Flintshire, Wales, lying on the estuary of the River Dee. It is the former county town of Flintshire. According to the 2011 Census, the population of the community of Flint was 12,953, increasing to 13,732 at the 2021 census. The urban area including Holywell and Bagillt had a population of 26,442.

== Geography ==
Flint is located in north-east Wales, adjoining the estuary of the River Dee, to the north of the town of Mold. Across the estuary, the Wirral can be seen from Flint and views to the south of the town include Halkyn Mountain. As the crow flies, Flint is located less than 12 miles from the English urban area of Liverpool, and even closer to its metro area. However, the two estuaries in between make the distance travelling on land almost twice as long.

== History ==
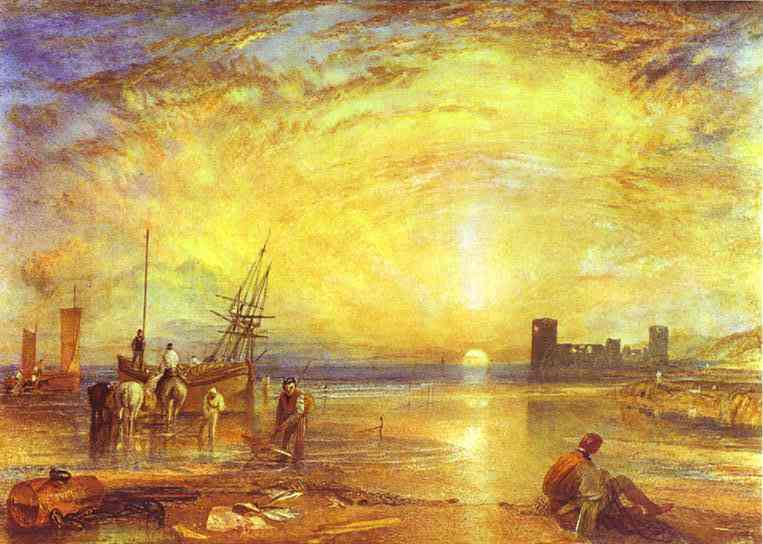
Flint Castle by William Turner

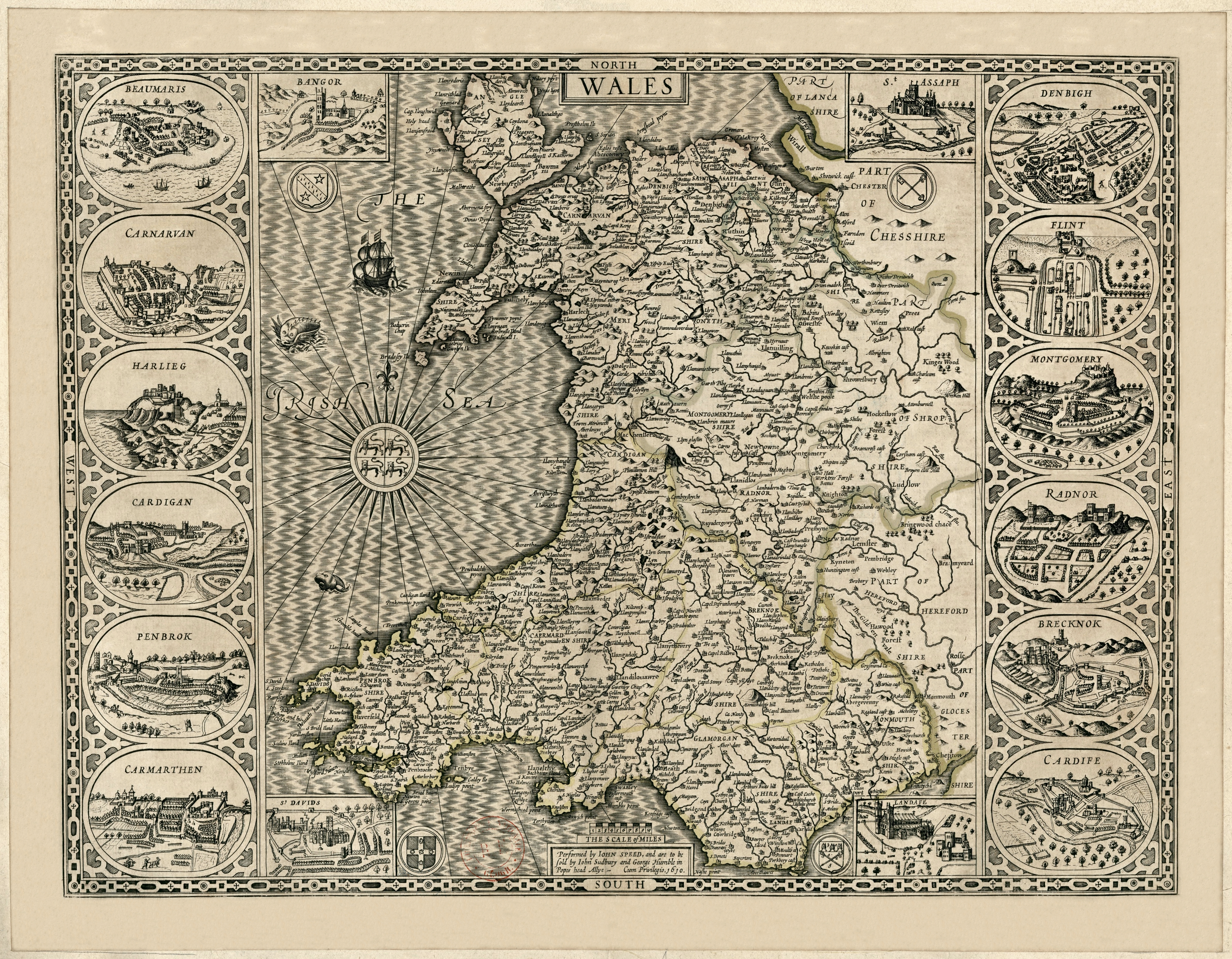
John Speed's map of Wales, made in 1610. The town of Flint can be seen at the top right

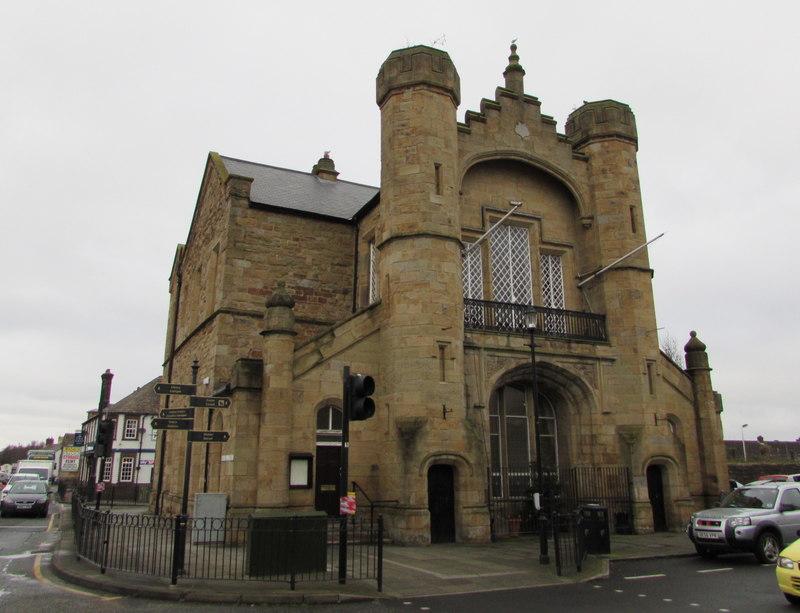
Flint Town Hall

The name refers to the stony platform on which the castle was built, and was first recorded in 1277 in the French form le Chaylou (cf modern French caillou, "gravel").

Edward I began to build Flint Castle in 1277, during his campaign to conquer Wales. Both castle and town were attacked by the forces of Madog ap Llywelyn during the revolt of 1294–95; the defenders of the town burnt it in order to deny its use to the Welsh.

Richard II was handed over to his enemy, and cousin, Henry Bolingbroke in the castle in 1399. As a consequence, it is the setting for Act III, Scene III of the Shakespeare play Richard II. The castle was the first of Edward I's 'iron ring' of royal castles to be built in Wales, and the design served as the basis for larger castles such as Harlech Castle and Rhuddlan Castle. Owain Glyndŵr unsuccessfully assaulted it at the commencement of his revolt in 1400.

The town did not have a wall, but a protective earthen and wooden palisaded ditch. The outline of this remained visible in the pattern of streets until the mid-1960s, and the medieval boundary can still be traced now. This can be seen in John Speed's map of Flintshire.

Flint Town Hall, the home of Flint Town Council, was erected in 1840. Until 1935 the Constable of Flint Castle served ex officio as Mayor of Flint.

In 1969 Flint hosted the National Eisteddfod, and so the town has a circle of Gorsedd stones in the field adjacent to Gwynedd County Primary School. In July 2006 the stones were centre stage in the National Eisteddfod Proclamation Ceremony which formally announced Mold as the 2007 host town of the event. The Urdd National Eisteddfod was held in Flint in 2016.

== Governance ==
Flint Town Council consists of 15 councillors who are elected from four wards; 2 from Oakenholt, 3 from Castle and 5 each from Coleshill and Trelawny wards. For elections to Flintshire County Council, three councillors are elected from Flint: Coleshill and Trelawny, and one each from Flint: Castle and Flint: Oakenholt. Flint is part of the Alyn and Deeside constituency and North Wales region for the Senedd, and of the Alyn and Deeside constituency for parliament.

== Culture and demography ==
In 2001 only 18% of the local population identified as Welsh, although this census controversially had no "Welsh" tick box.

In the census of 2011, 57.1% stated they had Welsh, or Welsh and other combined, identity. Many people in Flint have some knowledge of the Welsh language, although competence varies. Implementation of the European Union's freedom of movement provisions has led to a noticeable increase in the numbers of Polish-language speakers in Flint. Several retail businesses display information in Polish as well as in English and Welsh and the town has a number of Polish shops specialising in Polish products.

The Flint accent is frequently misidentified with that of Liverpool, although it has arisen in fact as a unique blending of the speech patterns of the area's Welsh speakers, earlier Irish settlers, and the residents of nearby Cheshire, Wirral, and the wider Merseyside region.

There are several songs associated with Flint. The most widely sung is "The Yard". Another popular song is "50 German bombers over Flint", which tells the story of a wartime bombing raid over nearby Liverpool that accidentally targeted the town of Flint instead. Verses describe the arrival of the bombers over Flint, and how they were shot down by the "Bagillt Navy". Eventually, the ill-fated German aircrew were fished out by the "Greenfield Fishers". The song is often sung in a drunken, friendly manner to the accompaniment of much hand clapping and revelry.

== Transport ==
Flint railway station lies on the North Wales Coast Line and is served by Transport for Wales services from Manchester Piccadilly to Llandudno. A north-south service between Cardiff and Holyhead also calls, as do some Avanti West Coast services between London Euston and Holyhead. Bus services are operated by Arriva Buses Wales.

== Education ==
The town has three high schools: St Richard Gwyn Catholic High School, Flint High School and Ysgol Maes Hyfryd. Primary schools in Flint include the Gwynedd School, Cornist Park School, Ysgol Croes Atti (Welsh medium), St Mary's Catholic Primary School and Ysgol Pen Coch.

== Community ==
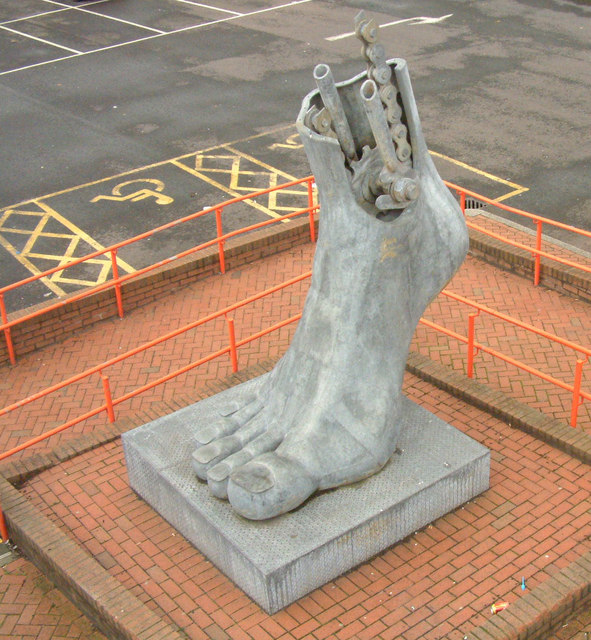
Footplate sculpture at Flint railway station, designed by Brian Fell.

Flint once had its own low-powered television relay transmitter, designed to provide improved coverage of Welsh channels in an area that would otherwise receive only English television signals. Since 2009, signals have been transmitted digitally from Storeton transmitting station on the Wirral.

Perhaps one of the town's most striking images, in addition to the castle, is the group of three tower blocks of flats near the town centre. The first two blocks were built in the 1960s and named Bolingbroke Heights and Richard Heights, with a third, Castle Heights, added shortly afterwards.

Flint's football team is Flint Town United. They play in the Cymru Premier, the top division of Welsh football following promotion from the Cymru North in 2023/24. Nicknamed "the Silkmen", they play their home games at Cae-y-Castell.

Brian Fell's sculpture footplate can be seen at Flint railway station. Initially it was thought to be an imitation of the famous Monty Python foot drawn by Terry Gilliam.

The town has a library which was extensively refurbished in 2020, and a leisure centre named the Jade Jones Pavilion to honour the town's Olympian. As of February 2023 Flint Retail Park was undergoing expansion, The town centre has been the subject of a regeneration scheme which began in 2012.

A lifeboat station was established in Flint in 1966, operated by the RNLI.

== Notable people ==
- Paul Draper (born 1970), songwriter and musician, went to school in Flint.
- Ian Puleston-Davies (born 1958), actor and writer, plays Owen Armstrong in Coronation Street.
- Julie Roberts (born 1963) painter who works in acrylics, oils and watercolours.

=== Sport ===
- Enoch Bagshaw (1884–1930), an American football player and coach.
- Ron Hewitt (1928–2001), footballer with over 500 club caps and 5 for Wales.
- Allan Jones (1940–1993), footballer with 249 caps with Brentford F.C.
- Brian Godfrey (1940–2010), footballer with over 590 club caps and 3 for Wales.
- Andy Holden (born 1963), footballer with over 170 club caps, nephew of Ron Hewitt
- Jade Jones (born 1993), 2012 and 2016 Olympic taekwondo gold medalist, attended Flint High School.
- Ian Rush (born 1961), footballer with 602 club caps and 73 for Wales, went to school in Flint; some family live in the area.
- Dylan Levitt (born 2000) footballer who came through Manchester United F.C. Academy, but now plays for Scottish Premiership football club Hibernian F.C.
