= Julie Roberts (artist) =

Welsh artist (born 1963)

- Born: 12 September 1963 (age 63); Flint, Wales, United Kingdom
- Education: Wrexham School of Art; Saint Martin's School of Art; Glasgow School of Art
- Occupation: Painter
- Website: julieroberts-art.co.uk

Julie Roberts (born 12 September 1963) is a Welsh painter who works in acrylics, oils and watercolours. Taught at the Wrexham School of Art, Saint Martin's School of Art and the Glasgow School of Art, she used medical equipment and furniture in her early works before moving on to include deceased humans, dolls and mannequins in her paintings. Roberts has done group or solo exhibitions in several major American and European cities and her works are held in the public or private collections of various museums.

== Early life and education ==
On 12 September 1963, Roberts was born in Flint, North Wales, United Kingdom. She and her three siblings briefly spent some periods of time in foster care and children's homes as a consequence of her father being an alcoholic before being reunited with her birth family. She was interested in feminism and the works of the French philosopher Michel Foucault. From 1980 to 1984, she studied design at Wrexham School of Art, earning an Ordinary National Certificate and a Higher National Diploma. Between 1986 and 1987, Roberts did postgraduate studies at Saint Martin's School of Art, London. She went on to study for a Master of Fine Arts degree at Glasgow School of Art, Glasgow from 1988 to 1990. Roberts was a visiting student at the Hungarian University of Fine Arts in 1992.

== Career ==
In her early works, she used medical equipment and furniture in composing a single image isolated against a saturated colour ground throughout the first decade of her career, such as in the 1992 work Obstetrics and Gynaecology Couch. Roberts made the Straightjacket series in which one of her 1995 paintings known as Restraining Coat (Female 2) presented several equipment pieces employed in the restraining of male and female patients by psychiatrists during the 19th century. She began to paint pictures of genetic monsters that same year. Her 1996 painting called Crime of Passion included a human individual seen to be a pair of legs lying beside a table. Roberts spent one year at the British School at Rome as the first artist on a scholarship from the Scottish Arts Council, and wanted to use her time in the city to begin mulling new ideas and broaden her knowledge on painting. She painted the study and desk of Sigmund Freud in multiple paintings in 1996, which was influenced by her one-year study period in Rome. In 1999, Roberts produced a series of works concerned with murder, painting and drawing Jack the Ripper's victims.

She subsequently produced paintings focused on abandoned or orphaned children, and of some famous individuals on their deathbeds. Roberts made the 2006 work called The Good Wife taken from 1930s manuals on how to be a good housewife. That same year, she used photographs of the Glasgow School of Art of female students in the 1900s drawing and painting in multiple places for the oil painting Girls Painting (The Drawing Lesson). The series partly paid tribute to Charles Rennie Mackintosh's building and to the school's progressive attitude towards women students at the 20th century's commencement. In 2010, she made a series of paintings reminiscent of children's books and instruction manuals taken from historical archives on children under constraints, estranged from normal family life or displaced. Roberts was inspired to produce the series by mid-20th century children's homes run by Barnardo's, foster care children and evacuees. Roberts has done group or solo exhibitions in several major European and American cities and her works are held in the collections of various museums and private collections.

== Analysis ==
Roberts paints in acrylics, oils and watercolours. According to Catherine M. Grant in Grove Art Online, Roberts used "a graphic style in which an object, painted from a photograph, is depicted floating against a monochromatic background". In Roberts' early career, humans were not featured in her works before introducing deceased bodies, dolls and mannequins. Ken Johnson of The New York Times observed that she "applies paint in tastefully muted hues so thickly it is as if she is frosting a cake. In so doing, she abstracts the imagery to sweetly cartoonish effect." The List's Alexander Kennedy wrote Roberts produced "images that manage to capture something of the difficulty that women artists feel when confronted with the ‘boys club’ mentality that surrounds painting, without making this explicit or the reductive justification for her work."
