= Eirene White, Baroness White =

British politician (1909–1999)

The Right Honourable The Baroness White

Under-Secretary of State for the Colonies with Lord Taylor
- In office 1964–1965
- Prime Minister: Harold Wilson
- Preceded by: Richard Hornby and Nigel Fisher
- Succeeded by: Lord Taylor and Lord Beswick

Member of Parliament for East Flintshire
- In office 23 February 1950 – 29 May 1970
- Preceded by: New constituency
- Succeeded by: Stephen Barry Jones

Personal details
- Born: Eirene Lloyd Jones; 7 November 1909 Belfast, Ireland, UK
- Died: 23 December 1999 (aged 90) Abergavenny, Wales, UK
- Party: Labour

Eirene Lloyd White, Baroness White (née Jones; 7 November 1909 – 23 December 1999) was a British Labour Party politician and journalist.

== Early life ==
White was born in Belfast, the daughter of Dr Thomas Jones, commonly known as "TJ", a civil servant, educationalist and friend of the establishment. She was educated at St Paul's Girls' School in London, and then read Philosophy, Politics and Economics at Somerville College, Oxford. She spent a year in Heidelberg before working for the New York Public Library. Back in England, she studied housing policies and the problems of the homeless.

== Career ==
During the Second World War, White joined the Women's Voluntary Service and became Welsh Regional Secretary. She was recruited by the Ministry of Labour to help with the training of workers in Wales, particularly women, for the war effort. She also worked as a civil servant at the Board of Education until 1945 and after the War as a political correspondent for both the Manchester Evening News and the BBC. Following national journalists such as Ellen Baylis, she was the first provincial journalist allowed access to the parliamentary lobby.

White stood for the Labour Party at the 1945 general election in Flintshire without success. She was elected a member of Labour's National Executive Committee (NEC) in the women's section in 1947. She was elected Labour MP for East Flintshire in 1950, becoming one of the first female MPs in Wales. Early on, she put forward a private member's bill that encouraged the government to relax the divorce laws. Annoyed by fights between left and right, she stepped down from the NEC in 1953 but returned in 1959 and remained until 1972.

When Labour came to power under Harold Wilson in 1964, White became parliamentary under-secretary at the Colonial Office, then in 1966 Minister of State at the Foreign Office and in 1967 Minister of State at the Welsh Office for three years. White managed to hang on to her marginal constituency for 20 years; at the 1959 election her majority was only 75 votes.

White was chairman of the Fabian Society in 1958–59 and of the Labour Party NEC in 1968–69. She was a governor of the British Film Institute and a member of the board of the Trade Films Council.

In 1970, she retired from the House of Commons and was created a life peer on 12 October 1970 taking the title Baroness White, of Rhymney in the County of Monmouth. Later posts included president of Coleg Harlech and governor of the National Library of Wales. She was chairman of the Land Authority for Wales (1976–80), deputy chairman of the Metrication Board (1972–76), and a member of the Royal Commission on Environment Pollution (1974–81). She was Deputy Speaker of the House of Lords from 1979 to 1989. She was awarded an Honorary Degree (Doctor of Laws) from the University of Bath in 1983.

On 10 June 2022, a purple plaque was unveiled at Flint Town Hall in her honour, recognizing the fact that she was one of the first three women to represent Wales in the UK Parliament, and indeed Wales's only female MP during ten years.

== Personal life ==
In 1948, she married fellow House of Commons lobby correspondent John Cameron White (1911–1968). They had no children.

== Death ==
She died, aged 90, in Abergavenny.

A viewfinder monument was erected on the summit of Allt yr Esgair at 393 metres/1290 feet (Grid Ref SO126243).

Parliament of the United Kingdom
New constituency	Member of Parliament for East Flintshire; 1950 – 1970	Succeeded by Barry Jones
Political offices
Preceded by Richard Hornby; Nigel Fisher	Under-Secretary of State for the Colonies; 1964–1965; With: Lord Taylor	Succeeded by Lord Taylor; Lord Beswick
Party political offices
Preceded by Roy Jenkins	Chairman of the Fabian Society; 1958–1959	Succeeded by Billy Hughes
Preceded by Jennie Lee	Chair of the Labour Party; 1968–1969	Succeeded by Arthur Skeffington
