= Mark Tami =

British politician (born 1962)

The Right Honourable Sir Mark Tami MP
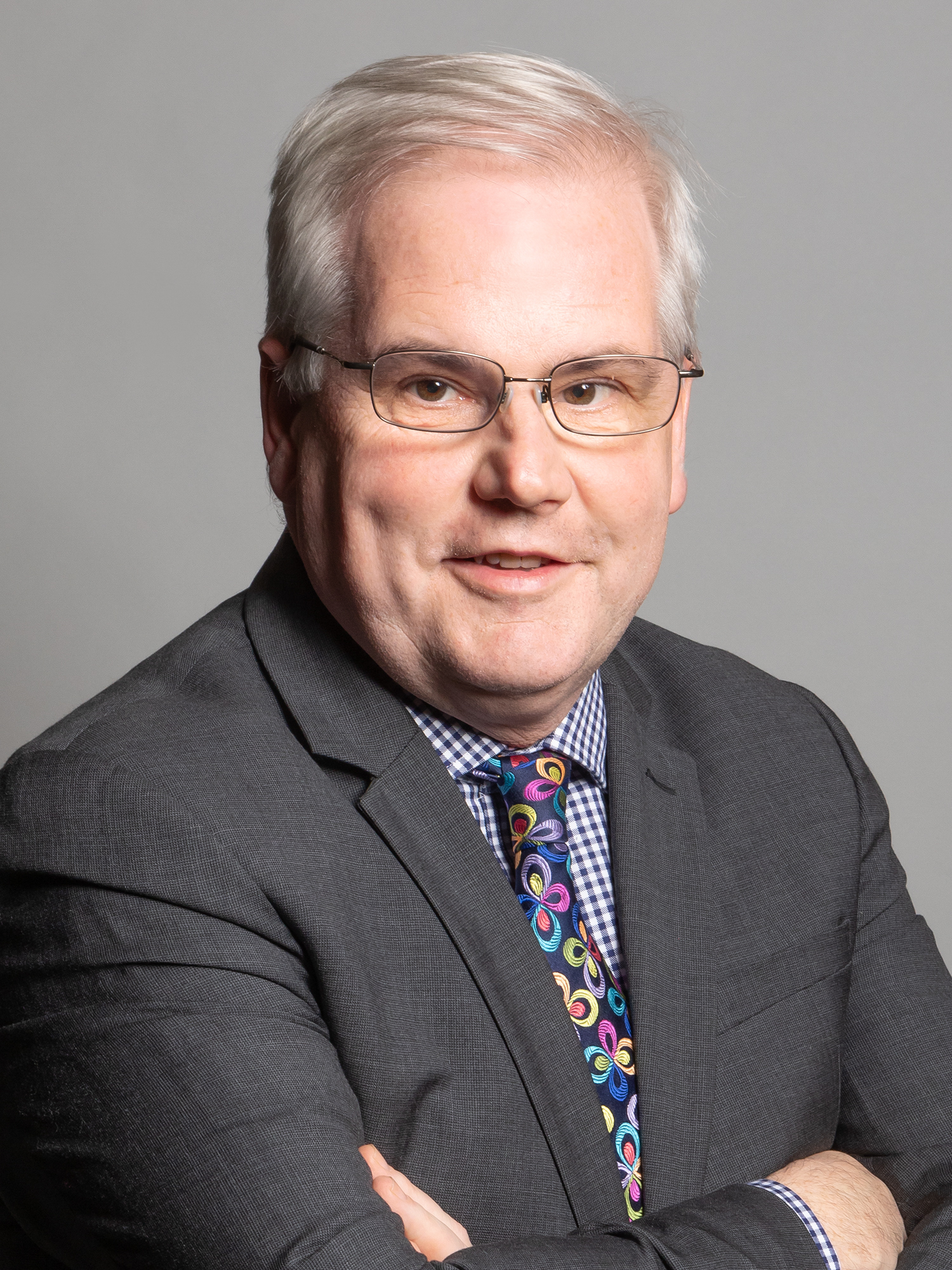
- Official portrait, 2020

Government Deputy Chief Whip Treasurer of the Household
- Incumbent
- Assumed office 10 July 2024
- Prime Minister: Keir Starmer; Andy Burnham
- Preceded by: Marcus Jones

Opposition Deputy Chief Whip in the House of Commons
- In office 5 September 2023 – 5 July 2024 Serving with Holly Lynch
- Leader: Keir Starmer
- Preceded by: Lilian Greenwood
- Succeeded by: Gagan Mohindra; Joy Morrissey

Opposition Pairing Whip
- In office 11 October 2010 – 5 September 2023
- Leader: Ed Miliband; Harriet Harman; Jeremy Corbyn; Keir Starmer
- Preceded by: Position Established

Member of Parliament for Alyn and Deeside
- Incumbent
- Assumed office 7 June 2001
- Preceded by: Barry Jones
- Majority: 8,794 (20.3%)

Personal details
- Born: Mark Richard Tami; 3 October 1962 (age 63) Enfield, London, England
- Party: Labour
- Spouse: Sally Daniels Tami
- Children: 2
- Education: University of Wales, Swansea
- Website: www.marktami.co.uk

Sir Mark Richard Tami (born 3 October 1962) is a Welsh Labour Party politician who has been the Member of Parliament (MP) for Alyn and Deeside since 2001. He has served as Deputy Government Chief Whip in the House of Commons since 2024.

== Early life ==
Born in Enfield, north London, Tami was educated at Enfield Grammar School (by then a comprehensive school), and graduated in history at the University of Wales, Swansea. He was previously National Head of Policy of the union Amicus (previously the Amalgamated Engineering and Electrical Union.

== Parliamentary career ==
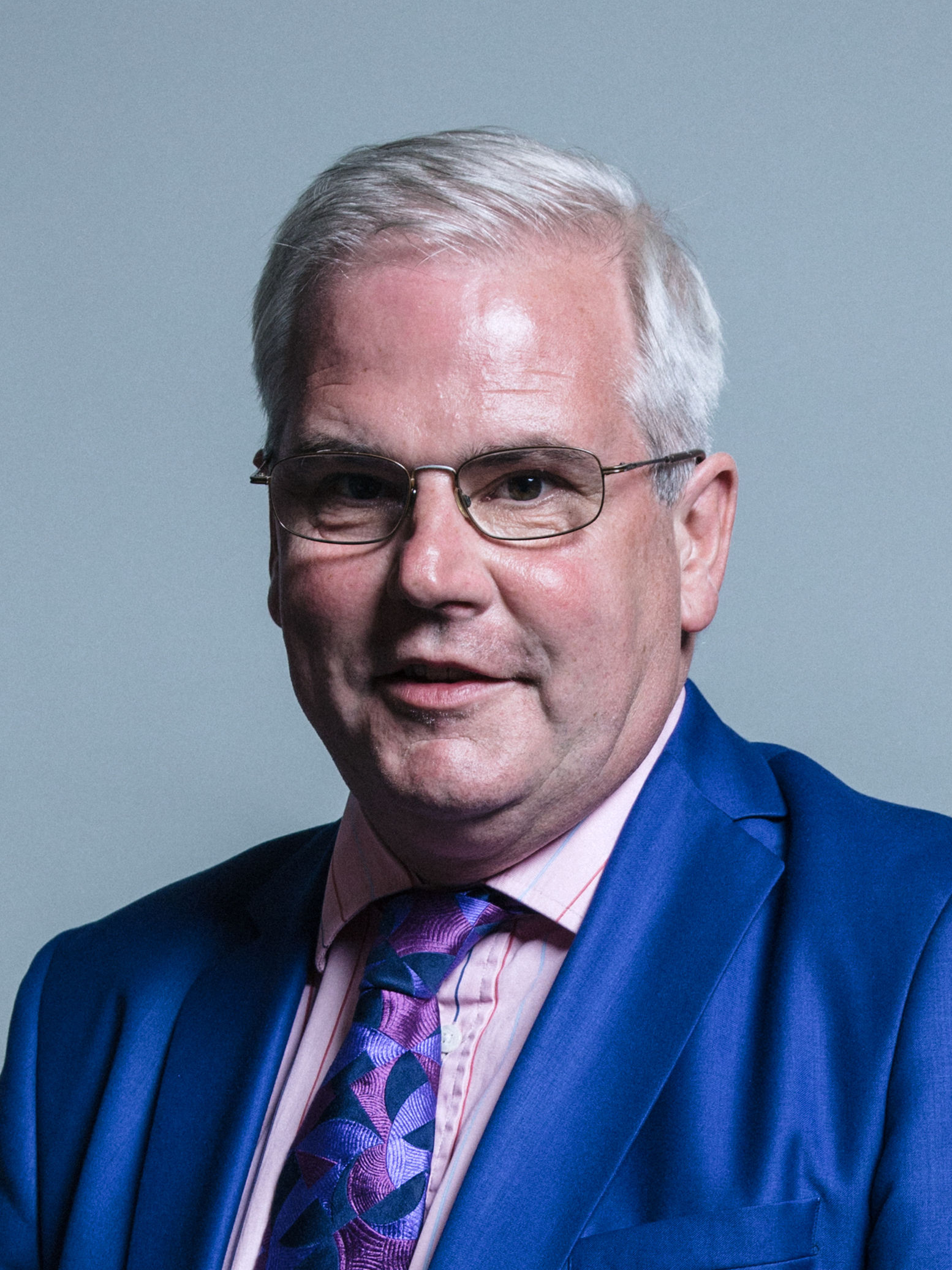
Official portrait, 2017

Tami was first elected as MP for Alyn and Deeside in 2001 with a majority of 9,222, following the decision of the seat's former MP Barry Jones to step down from Parliament.

Tami was returned again as MP for Alyn and Deeside at the 2005 general election, with a reduced majority. He resigned his post as Parliamentary Private Secretary to Dawn Primarolo on 6 September 2006, due to the refusal by Tony Blair to name a date for stepping down as Prime Minister. He was joined by future Deputy Leader of the Labour Party Tom Watson and fellow Welsh MPs Ian Lucas and Wayne David in resignation.

Tami was promoted by Gordon Brown in July 2007 to a whip. In the 2010 general election, Tami was re-elected for a third time, however with a further reduced majority of 2,919.

Tami was re-elected as MP for Alyn and Deeside on 7 May 2015 at the general election with a slightly increased majority from 2010. In the 2017 general election, Tami was returned with a vastly increased majority of 5,235 votes and a 52.1% share of the vote.

On Thursday 12 December 2019, Tami was the only Labour MP in North Wales not to lose his seat, narrowly beating the Conservative candidate Sanjoy Sen by just 213 votes, falling from a majority of over 5000 in the previous election.

In March 2020, Tami led a cross-party campaign to end the 9-week wait without income for people on Universal Credit when they reach state pension age. After Tami's campaign, the government changed the regulations. After the 2024 United Kingdom general election, he was appointed Deputy Chief Whip by Keir Starmer.

In July 2026, he was reappointed to the new government as Deputy Chief Whip by Andy Burnham.

== Expenses ==
During the MPs expenses scandal Tami was one of more than 50 MPs identified by the Daily Telegraph of over-claiming on council tax expenses for their second home. Tami said, "I will go back and calculate the exact level I have over-claimed in error and repay the sum involved." He paid back the full £996.70 for council tax on his London home.

== Personal life ==
He married Sally Daniels in July 1994 in Bromley and they have two sons. They live in Llanfynydd having lived in Bromley for many years. He is a former member of the TUC General Council and an active member of the Fabian Society.

Tami's eldest son, Max, was diagnosed with acute lymphoblastic leukaemia in 2007 at age 9. Max made a full recovery following intensive chemotherapy and a stem cell transplant at Alder Hey Children's Hospital. Tami has repeatedly called for the Government to do more to help cancer patients and their families, including providing appropriate psychological support.

== Styles ==
- Mr Mark Richard Tami (3 October 1962 – 7 June 2001)
- Mr Mark Richard Tami MP (7 June 2001 – 23 November 2018)
- The Right Honourable Mark Richard Tami MP (23 November 2018 – 14 June 2025)
- The Right Honourable Sir Mark Richard Tami MP (14 June 2025 – present)

Parliament of the United Kingdom
Preceded by Barry Jones	Member of Parliament for Alyn and Deeside; 2001–present	Incumbent
Party political offices
Preceded by Lilian Greenwood	Labour Deputy Chief Whip in the House of Commons; 2023–present	Incumbent
