= Caergwrle Castle =

13th-century castle in Flintshire, Wales

- Castell Caergwrle (Welsh) (Note: Since 2024, Cadw, who maintain the site, use the Welsh name only.)
- Caergwrle, Flintshire in Wales
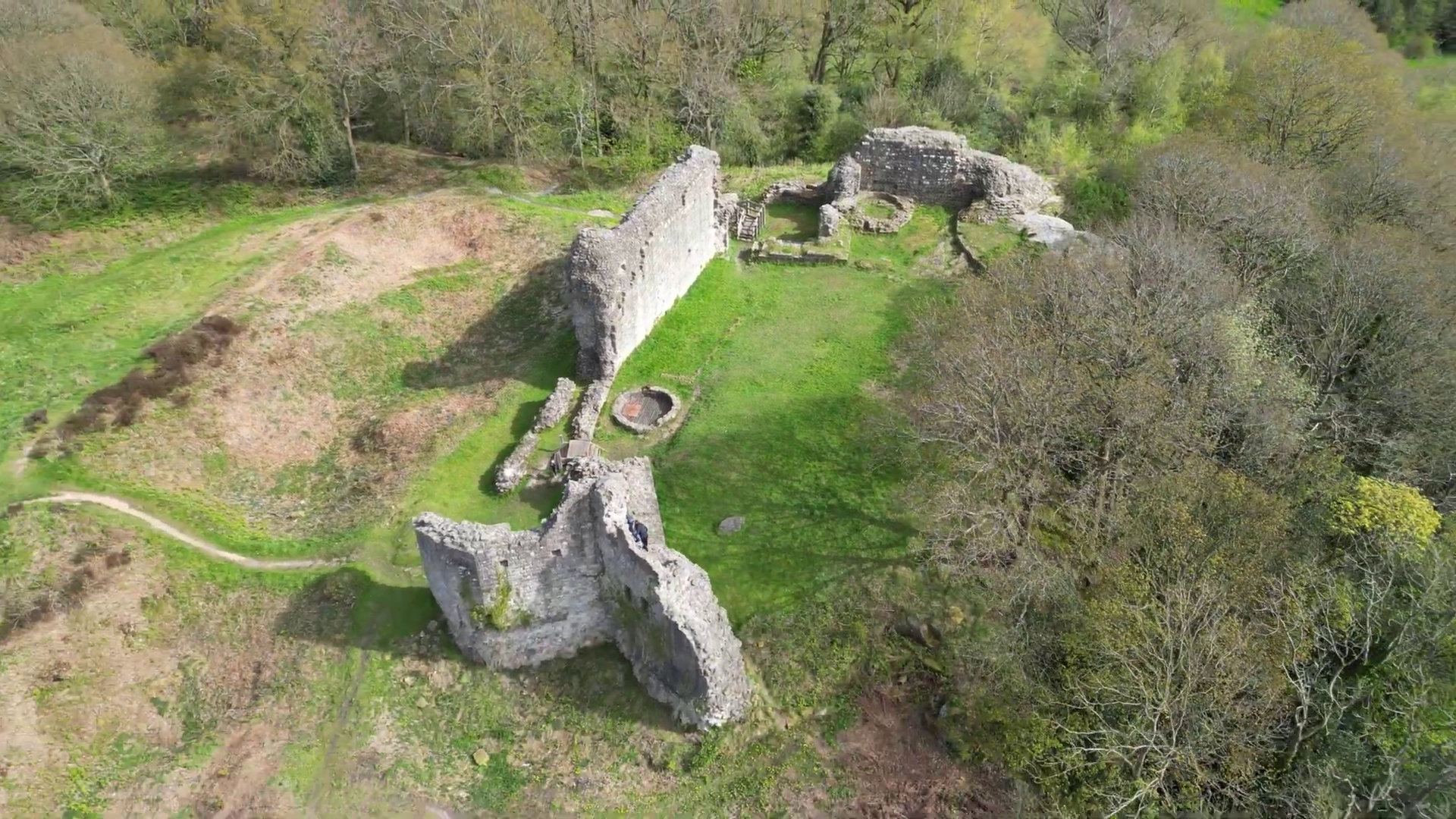
- Ruins of Caergwrle Castle

Site information
- Type: Castle
- Condition: Ruins remaining.
- Website: Castell Caergwle (Cadw)

Location
- Location in Wales
- Coordinates: 53.107290°N 3.037164°W

Site history
- Built: Approx 1277
- Materials: Stone
- Fate: Destroyed following fire.

Caergwrle Castle (Welsh: Castell Caergwrle), also known as Queen's Hope in scholarly texts, is a castle located in the village of Caergwrle, in Flintshire, Wales. It was built by the Welsh under Dafydd ap Gruffydd in service to Edward I of England. When Dafydd's forces rebelled against the English, Edward sent Reginald de Grey, 1st Baron Grey de Wilton to take the castle in June 1282, but Dafydd had retreated and sabotaged the structure. Rebuilding works began, and it was given to Edward's wife, Eleanor of Castile. A town was planned at the base of the castle, but this was abandoned after a fire broke out in September 1283 when both Edward and Eleanor were present. It was passed down the royal line, but was never rebuilt. In 1823, a workman discovered the Caergwrle Bowl near the castle; it is a unique Bronze Age bowl.

== Description ==
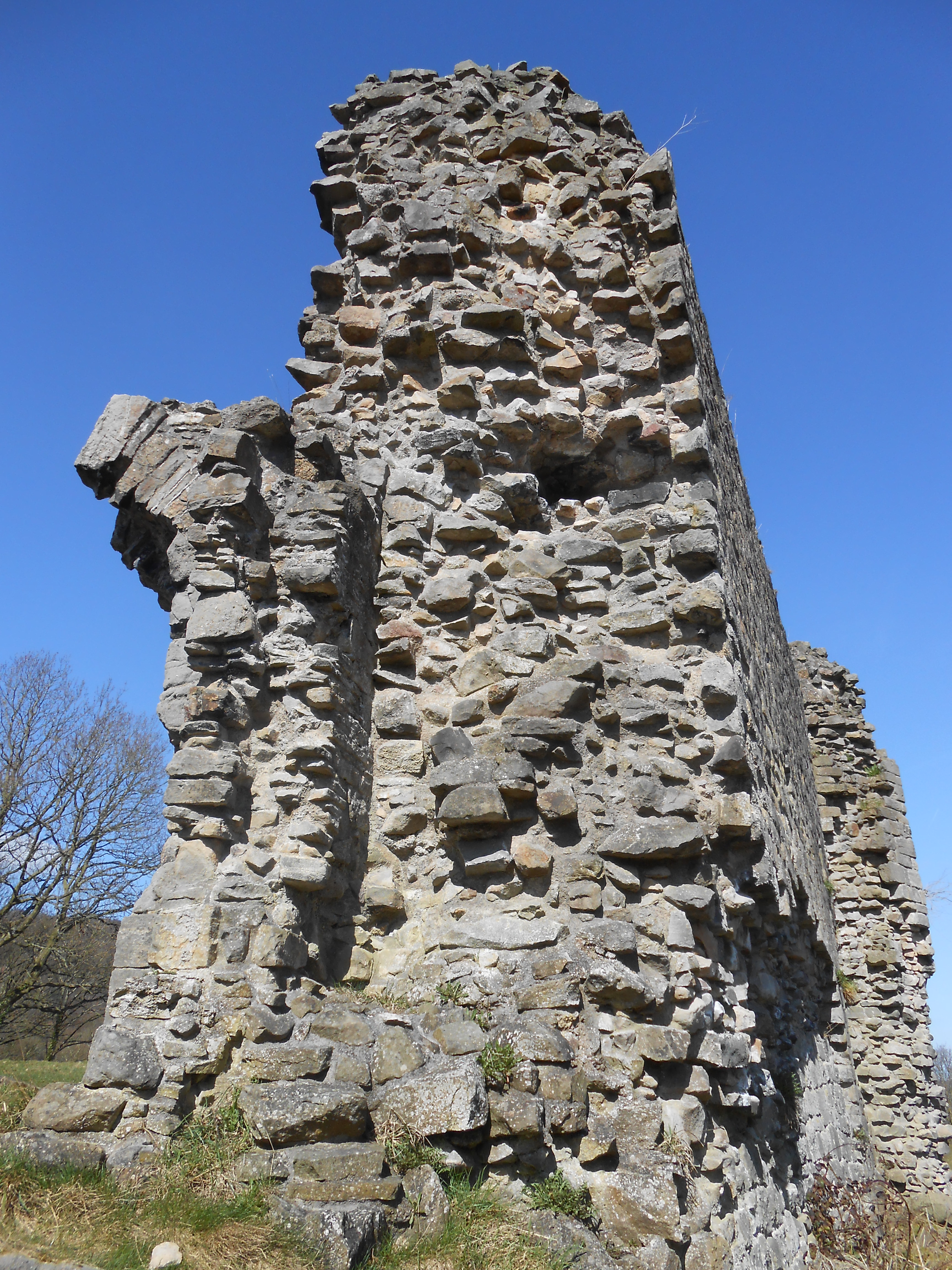
Castle ruins

Built on the south west corner of a steep hill near the Anglo-Welsh border, Caergwrle Castle has views which extend far into Cheshire. The foundations are made up of gritstone, locally quarried from Caergwrle hill, north west of the castle. There are two styles which appear in the masonry, with the most elaborate work taking place near the residential areas of the castle and on the exterior portions. During use the interior walls would have been plaster-covered, obscuring any masonry and therefore making detailed work unnecessary.

The west curtain wall is no longer present, nor is the majority of the south tower. The crag under which the south tower would have partially stood is missing, which may have been an indication of quarrying close to the castle itself. The hilltop was known for being used as a quarry for the construction of millstones during the 17th century. Following the destruction of the castle, looting took place. This resulted in several of the remaining walls missing large stones illustrating this taking place on an individual basis, as well as large sections of the castle entirely missing indicates that this would have taken place on an industrial scale. Historians suspect that the west wall and majority of the south tower was removed through those means, as it would have been easier to take apart and roll down the steep hill than other parts of the castle.

== History ==
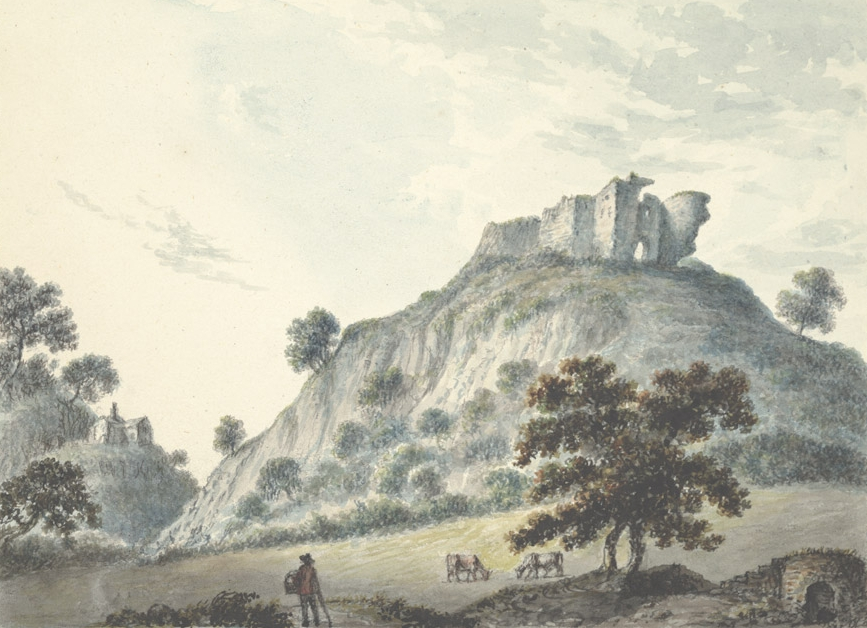
South aspect of Caergwrle Castle, c.1795

Prior to the current castle, of which ruins remain, there is thought to have been a hill fort at the site dating from either the late Roman/post Roman period. Construction of the castle began in 1277, after King Edward I of England gave the lordship of Hope to Dafydd ap Gruffydd as reward for his service in the wars against the Welsh which concluded earlier that year. Dafydd, brother to Llywelyn the Great, had fought against the Welsh after being imprisoned by Llywelyn to deny him his inherited land rights. Edward declared war in 1276, and afterwards enforced the division of inheritance on Llywelyn under Welsh law. This placed Edward in control of Welsh lands previously held by Llywelyn.

The first reference to the castle appears in the rolls of the Royal Wardrobe, referencing that Edward had sent 100 marks to Dafydd on 12 November 1278 towards the castle; however, there is debate between scholars whether this was to aid the initial construction or to help in the upkeep of an already extant building. Notable features included two D-shaped towers and a great circular keep overlooking the approach to the south-east. It has been speculated that Dafydd employed English masons to work on the castle, which was apparently unfinished when Dafydd revolted in 1282. Edward gathered an army to invade Wales in June. He sent Reginald de Grey, 1st Baron Grey de Wilton to take Caergwrle Castle. When forces under his command arrived on 16 June, they discovered Dafydd had already retreated and abandoned the location.

The Welsh had slighted the castle, even blocking up its well. Over the following fourteen weeks, Reginald set about restoring the castle. He left detailed notes on this venture, showing that it cost £1466 4s. 5 1/2d. Edward himself was thought to have been present for a couple of days prior to 6 July to instruct the architect James of Saint George in the reconstruction efforts. More than 340 carpenters and over 600 diggers were employed in the repair effort. A further 30 to 35 stonemasons worked on Caergwrle Castle each week from June through to November. A number of wooden buildings are referring to as having been constructed at this point, including a chapel, a bakehouse and several offices for clerks.

Edward gave Caergwrle Castle to his wife, Eleanor of Castile in February 1283. There are reports that the walls remained covered, indicating that works on them had not yet been finished when it was turned over to Eleanor. A town was planned to be built at the base of the castle, and on 25 June that year, Eleanor was granted permission to have a weekly market in the town. The intention was to allow English settlers to reside there, but an accidental fire in the castle occurred on 27 August while Edward and Eleanor were in attendance. The damaged castle was passed into the hands of Edward of Caernarfon (later Edward II of England), but he made no repairs. When Edward became king, it was passed to John of Cromwell for life on the basis that he would repair it. It has been doubted by historians that any repairs were made, as after John's death, it was given to Edward, the Black Prince, who noted that the walls and towers were in ruin and no housing was present. It was the final castle to be built by Welsh rulers before the loss of independence.

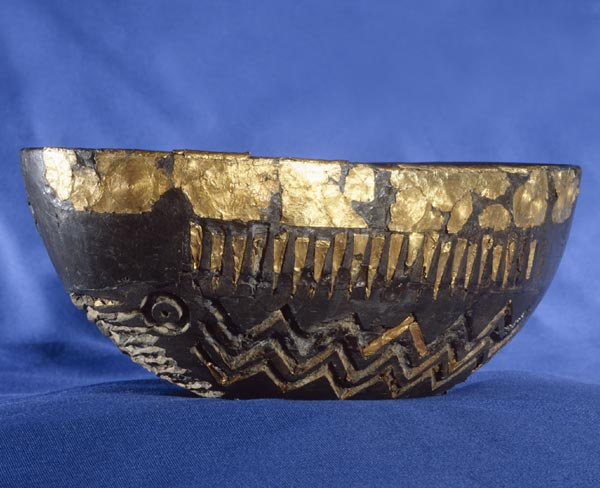
The Caergwrle Bowl discovered in the early 19th century, having been buried at the castle's grounds for over 3,000 years.

The Bronze Age Caergwrle Bowl was discovered by a workman digging a drain in the fields below the castle in 1823. It is made of shale, tin and gold in a unique configuration. Excavations took place at the castle in three phases between 1988 and 1990. They were concentrated on investigating the ground within the walls and the three surviving towers. Today, the castle's ruins are cared for by Cadw on behalf of the Welsh Government. They are a Grade I listed structure.

Since 2024, Cadw have used the Welsh name Castell Caergwrle in English, as part of an effort to standardise the names in both languages.
