= George Godding =

Welsh footballer (1896–1960)

Personal information
- Full name: George Alfred Godding
- Date of birth: 3 May 1896
- Place of birth: Chester, Cheshire
- Date of death: 18 November 1960 (aged 64)
- Place of death: Hawarden, Flintshire, Wales
- Height: 5 ft 10 in (1.78 m)
- Position: Goalkeeper

Senior career*
Years	Team	Apps	(Gls)
1922–1923	Wrexham		

International career
1923	Wales	2	(0)
- * Club domestic league appearances and goals

George Alfred Godding (3 May 1896 – 18 November 1960) was a Welsh footballer who played as a goalkeeper.

Godding played for Wrexham from 1922 to 1923.

He was part of the Wales national team, playing two matches. He played his first match on 17 March 1923 against Scotland and his last match on 14 April 1923 against Ireland.

== See also ==
- List of Wales international footballers (alphabetical)
