= East Flintshire =

UK Parliament constituency (1950–1983)

- Former county constituency for the House of Commons
- Preserved county: 1960–1974: Flintshire; 1974–1983: Clwyd

1950–1983
- Seats: One
- Created from: Flintshire
- Replaced by: Alyn & Deeside, Delyn and Wrexham

East Flintshire was a parliamentary constituency in Flintshire, North Wales. It returned one Member of Parliament (MP) to the House of Commons of the Parliament of the United Kingdom.

The constituency was created for the 1950 general election, and abolished for the 1983 general election.

== Boundaries ==
The Borough of Flint, the Urban Districts of Buckley, Connah's Quay, and Holywell, and the Rural Districts of Hawarden and Overton.

== Members of Parliament ==
Election	Member	Party
1950	Eirene White	Labour
1970	Barry Jones	Labour
1983	constituency abolished	

== Election results ==
=== Elections in the 1950s ===
General election 1950: East Flintshire
Party	Candidate	Votes	%	±%
Labour	Eirene White	21,529	48.5	
Conservative	George Currie	14,832	33.4	
Liberal	Stuart G Waterhouse	8,010	18.1	
Majority		6,697	15.1	
Turnout		44,371	88.0	
Labour win (new seat)				

General election 1951: East Flintshire
Party	Candidate	Votes	%	±%
Labour	Eirene White	23,959	53.8	+5.3
Conservative	George Currie	20,580	46.2	+12.8
Majority		3,379	7.6	−7.5
Turnout		44,371	86.4	−1.6
Labour hold		Swing	-3.8	

General election 1955: East Flintshire
Party	Candidate	Votes	%	±%
Labour	Eirene White	22,828	52.6	−1.2
Conservative	Kenneth G Knee	20,554	47.4	+1.2
Majority		2,274	5.2	−2.4
Turnout		43,382	84.1	−2.3
Labour hold		Swing	-1.2	

General election 1959: East Flintshire
Party	Candidate	Votes	%	±%
Labour	Eirene White	22,776	50.1	−2.5
Conservative	Fred Hardman	22,701	49.9	+2.5
Majority		75	0.2	−5.0
Turnout		45,477	86.4	+2.3
Labour hold		Swing	-2.5	

In the 1959 general election Flintshire East had the 9th highest turnout of any UK constituency.

=== Elections in the 1960s ===
General election 1964: East Flintshire
Party	Candidate	Votes	%	±%
Labour	Eirene White	25,469	54.2	+4.1
Conservative	Fred Hardman	21,513	45.8	−4.1
Majority		3,956	8.4	+8.2
Turnout		46,982	86.9	+0.5
Labour hold		Swing	-2.0	

In the 1964 general election Flintshire East had the 2nd highest turnout of any UK constituency.

General election 1966: East Flintshire
Party	Candidate	Votes	%	±%
Labour	Eirene White	24,442	51.3	−2.9
Conservative	Fred Hardman	15,960	33.5	−12.3
Liberal	Dennis O Diamond	6,348	13.3	New
Plaid Cymru	Gwilym Hughes	902	1.9	New
Majority		8,482	17.8	+9.4
Turnout		47,652	86.5	−0.4
Labour hold		Swing	-4.7	

In the 1966 general election Flintshire East had the 5th highest turnout of any UK constituency.

=== Elections in the 1970s ===
General election 1970: East Flintshire
Party	Candidate	Votes	%	±%
Labour	Stephen Barry Jones	24,227	46.1	−5.2
Conservative	Rodney M. Amyes	20,145	38.3	+4.8
Liberal	Dennis O Diamond	5,888	11.2	−2.1
Plaid Cymru	Gwilym Hughes	2,332	4.4	+2.5
Majority		4,082	7.8	−10.0
Turnout		52,592	81.1	−5.4
Labour hold		Swing	-5.0	

General election February 1974: East Flintshire
Party	Candidate	Votes	%	±%
Labour	Stephen Barry Jones	27,663	47.5	+1.4
Conservative	MJA Penston	18,811	32.3	−6.0
Liberal	Alex Carlile	10,653	18.3	+7.1
Plaid Cymru	Neil Taylor	1,135	2.0	−2.4
Majority		8,852	15.2	+7.4
Turnout		58,262	84.9	+3.8
Labour hold		Swing	-3.7	

General election October 1974: East Flintshire
Party	Candidate	Votes	%	±%
Labour	Stephen Barry Jones	27,002	48.9	+1.4
Conservative	MJA Penston	17,416	31.6	−0.7
Liberal	R.J.S. Fairley	8,986	16.3	−2.0
Plaid Cymru	F. Evans	1,779	3.2	+1.2
Majority		9,586	17.3	+2.1
Turnout		55,183	79.7	−5.2
Labour hold		Swing	-1.2	

General election 1979: East Flintshire
Party	Candidate	Votes	%	±%
Labour	Stephen Barry Jones	29,339	48.3	−0.6
Conservative	P Warburton-Jones	23,116	38.1	+6.5
Liberal	Alex Carlile	6,736	11.1	−5.2
Plaid Cymru	J Rogers	1,198	2.0	−1.2
Communist	G Davies	307	0.5	New
Majority		6,223	10.2	−6.9
Turnout		60,389	81.7	+2.0
Labour hold		Swing	-3.6	
