= Hector Giacomelli =

French painter

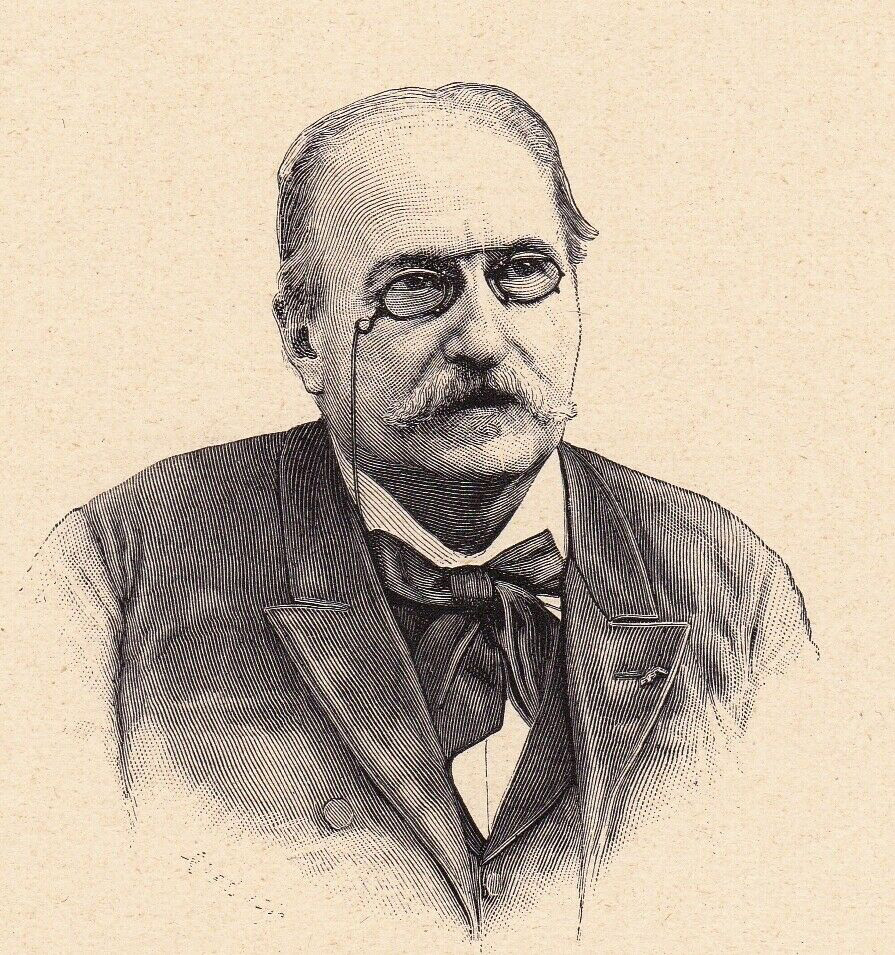
Hector Giacomelli

Hector Giacomelli (April 1, 1822 in Paris – December 1, 1904 in Menton), was a French watercolorist, engraver and illustrator, best known for his paintings of birds.

== Biography ==
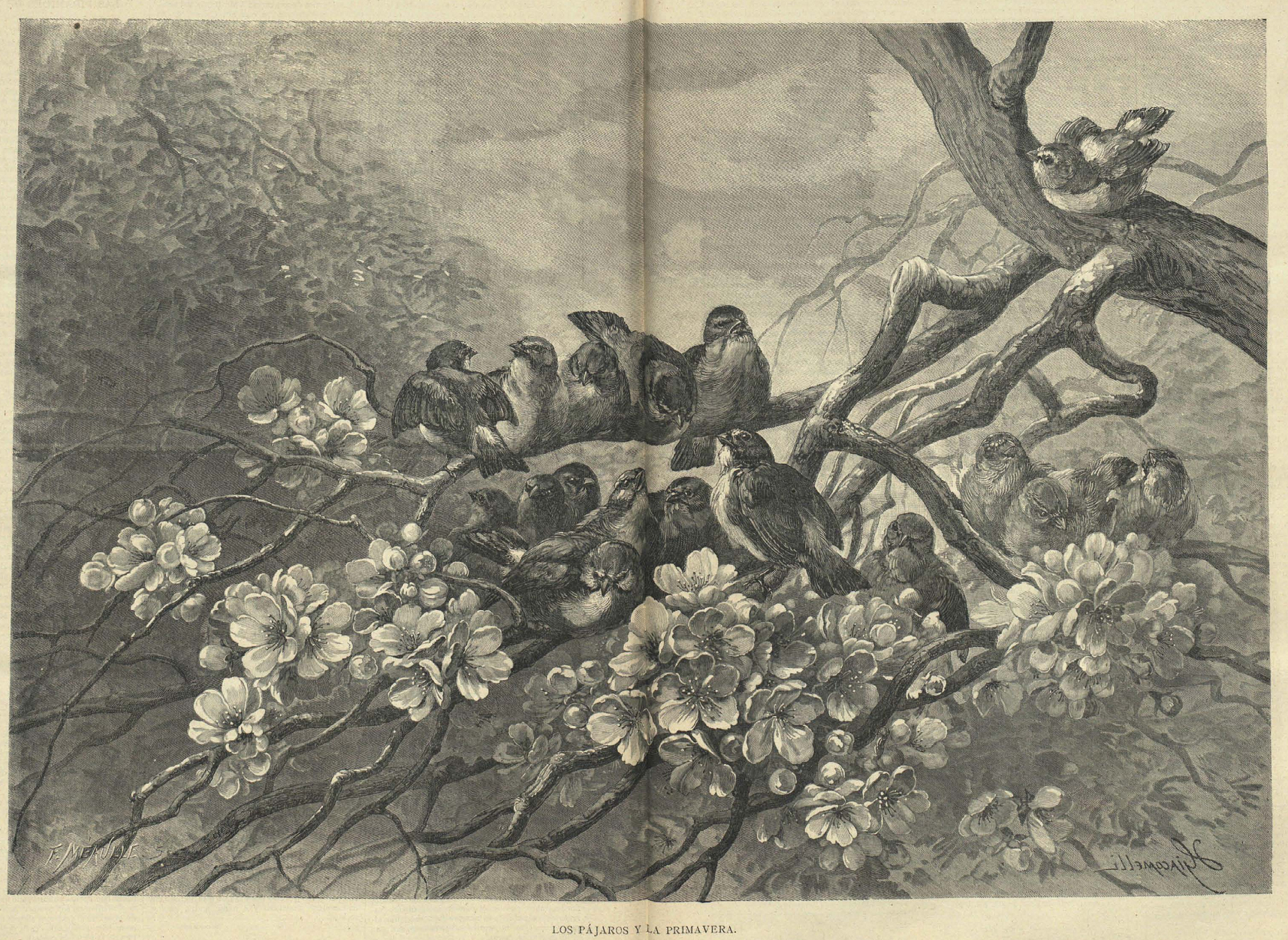
Work by Giacomelli, published in 1883.

His Italian father, a professor of singing, was first an engraver before becoming an industrial designer for a jeweler. When he was 30 years old, a serious illness forced him to go away from Paris. He then started to draw and paint plants, insects and birds around his new and spectacular house. Making much money in Paris, he developed a passion for the work of Auguste Raffet, whose catalogue of works he published in 1862. He worked with Gustave Doré, for which he composed ornaments like "The Holy Bible according to the Vulgate", published in 1866. He contributed drawings to several illustrated newspapers, such as Le Monde illustré, Le Magasin pittoresque, and L'Illustration. He also privately illustrated books that brought him wealthy bibliophiles. He was one of the organizers of the exposition of the century prints of 1887 and Section retrospective of Fine Arts, and the Universal Paris Exposition of 1889.

In addition to illustrating works by artists like Jules Michelet, André Theuriet François Coppée and Alfred de Musset, Giacomelli also became a collector.

== Works ==
Hector Giacomelli illustrated among others :

- Louis Desnoyers: The Mésaventures Jean-Paul Choppart (1865),
- Jules Michelet:
  - The Bird (1867),
  - The Bug (1875),
  - The Insect (1883)
- André Theuriet:
  - Nests (1879),
  - Sous Bois (1883),
  - Our Birds (1886),
- François Coppée: The Illustrated Month (1891),
- Alfred de Musset: History of a white merle (1904),
- (Eliza Allen Starr) "What We See" 1891
