= Battersea Cauldron =

Bronze cooking vessel found in England

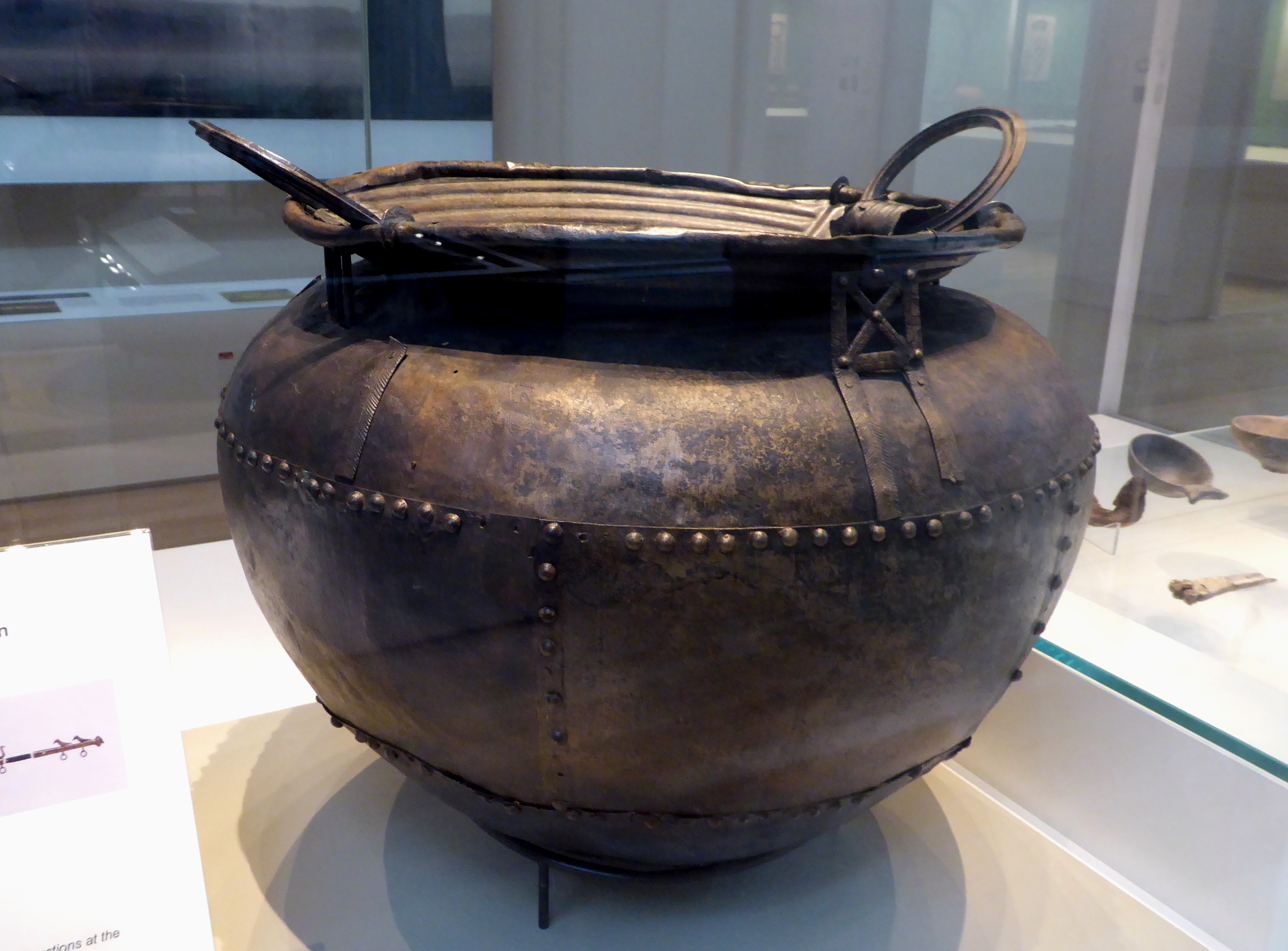
Battersea Cauldron in the British Museum in 2018

The Battersea Cauldron is a large bronze cooking vessel, dated to 800 BC to 700 BC. It was found in 1861 from dredging in the River Thames near the new Chelsea Bridge, which connects Chelsea on the north bank to Battersea on the south bank. It was bought by the British Museum from William Godwin shortly after it was discovered. It is one of over 60 examples of similar Late Bronze Age and Iron Age cauldrons found in Great Britain and Ireland.

The cauldron stands 40.5 centimetres (15.9 in) high, has a diameter of 56 centimetres (22 in), and a capacity of about 70 litres (15 imp gal; 18 US gal). It was made from seven curved plates of bronze riveted together, forming a cooking vessel with a large round body and narrower neck. The opening flares out, strengthened with corrugations around the rim, which has a separate tubular binding. Two ring handles are attached to riveted straps. As a large vessel for preparing food or drink, it may have been used for communal feasts, and has the patches and repairs from use over an extended period, perhaps several generations. It may have been deliberately placed in the river as a religious sacrifice.

Late Bronze Age and Iron Age cauldrons from Britain and Ireland have been connected archaeologically and culturally to similar cauldrons from Greece. Similar bronze cauldrons of the Atlantic Bronze Age are also known from Iberia.

Large bronze cauldrons are also found in elite burials of the Iron Age Hallstatt culture in Germany and France. The Hochdorf Chieftain's Grave in Germany contained a cauldron imported from Greece which was originally filled with mead and contained a gold serving bowl.

== Gallery ==
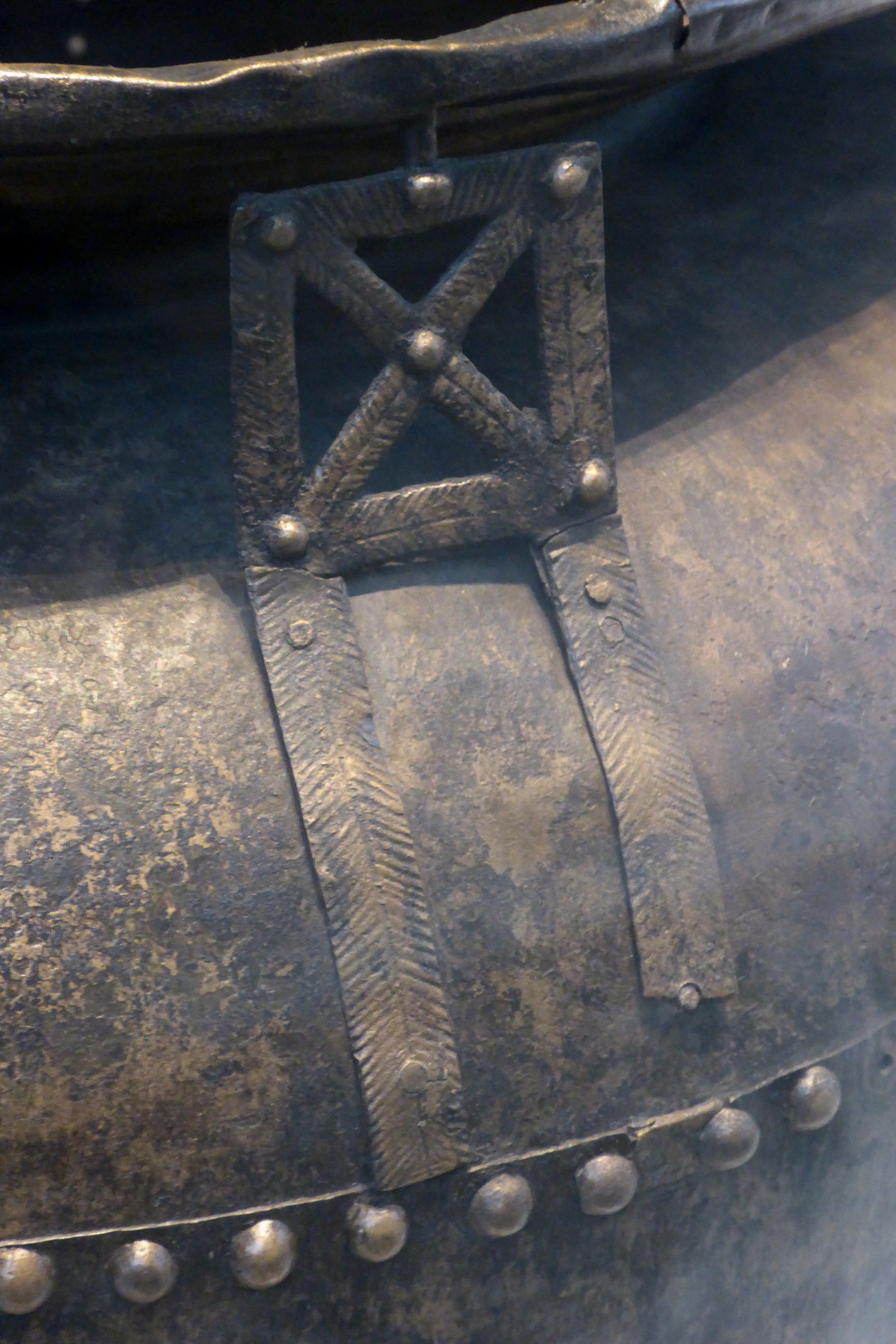
Side detail

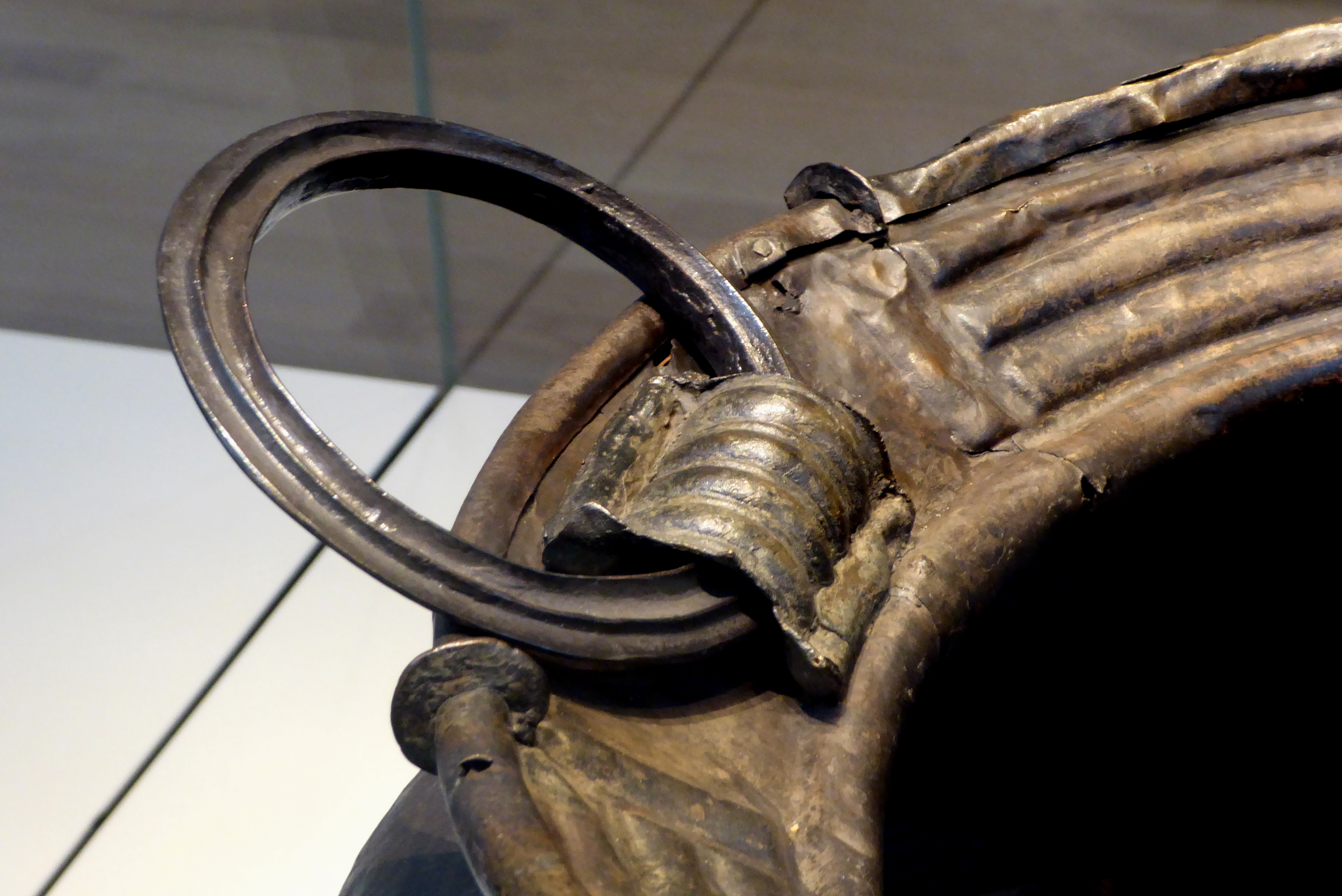
Ring handle

== See also ==
- Bronze Age Britain
- British Iron Age
- The Battersea Shield, found nearby a few years earlier
- A group of 17 cauldrons dated to around 300BC was found at Chiseldon in Wiltshire in 2004-5
