= Alyn and Deeside (UK Parliament constituency) =

UK Parliament constituency (since 1983)

Coordinates: 53.208°N 3.117°W

- County constituency for the House of Commons
- Interactive map of the constituency.
- Location of the constituency within Wales
- Preserved county: Clwyd
- Population: 82,505 (2011 census)
- Electorate: 75,695 (March 2020)
- Major settlements: Flint, Shotton, Connah's Quay, Buckley, Hawarden and Caergwrle

Current constituency
- Created: 1983
- Member of Parliament: Mark Tami (Labour)
- Seats: One
- Created from: Flintshire East

Overlaps
- Senedd: Fflint Wrecsam

Alyn and Deeside (Welsh: Alun a Glannau Dyfrdwy) is a parliamentary constituency (Note: A county constituency (for the purposes of election expenses and type of returning officer. As with all constituencies, the constituency elects one Member of Parliament (MP) by the first past the post system of election at least every five years.) represented in the House of Commons of the Parliament of the United Kingdom (at Westminster) since 2001 by Mark Tami of the Labour Party. The constituency was created in 1983, and it elects one Member of Parliament (MP) by the first-past-the-post method of election.

The Alyn and Deeside Senedd constituency was created with the same boundaries in 1999.

The constituency retained its name and gained wards, as part of the 2023 review of Westminster constituencies of the Boundary Commission for Wales for the 2024 general election.

== Boundaries ==
1983–1997: The District of Alyn and Deeside, and the Borough of Wrexham Maelor wards 13 and 14.

1997–2010: The District of Alyn and Deeside.

2010–2024: The Flintshire County electoral divisions of Aston, Broughton North East, Broughton South, Buckley Bistre East, Buckley Bistre West, Buckley Mountain, Buckley Pentrobin, Caergwrle, Connah's Quay Central, Connah's Quay Golftyn, Connah's Quay South, Connah's Quay Wepre, Ewloe, Hawarden, Higher Kinnerton, Hope, Llanfynydd, Mancot, Penyffordd, Queensferry, Saltney Mold Junction, Saltney Stonebridge, Sealand, Shotton East, Shotton Higher, Shotton West, and Treuddyn.

2024–present: From the 2024 general election the seat of Alyn and Deeside was expanded towards Flint as a result of the abolition of the Delyn constituency in the 2023 review of Westminster constituencies. Under the review, the constituency was defined as being composed of the following wards of the County of Flintshire as they existed on 1 December 2020:

- Aston, Bagillt East, Bagillt West, Broughton North East, Broughton South, Buckley Bistre East, Buckley Bistre West, Buckley Mountain, Buckley Pentrobin, Caergwrle, Connah's Quay Central, Connah's Quay Golftyn, Connah's Quay South, Connah's Quay Wepre, Ewloe, Flint Castle, Flint Coleshill, Flint Oakenholt, Flint Trelawny, Hawarden, Higher Kinnerton, Hope, Llanfynydd, Mancot, Penyffordd, Queensferry, Saltney Mold Junction, Saltney Stonebridge, Sealand, Shotton East, Shotton Higher, Shotton West, and Treuddyn.

Following a local government boundary review which came into effect in May 2022, the constituency now comprises the following wards of the County of Flintshire from the 2024 general election:

- Bagillt, Broughton North East, Broughton South, Buckley: Bistre East, Buckley: Bistre West, Buckley: Mountain, Buckley: Pentrobin, Caergwrle, Connah's Quay Central, Connah's Quay: Golftyn, Connah's Quay South, Connah's Quay: Wepre, Flint: Castle, Flint: Coleshill and Trelawney, Flint: Oakenholt, Hawarden: Aston, Hawarden: Ewloe, Hawarden: Mancot, Higher Kinnerton, Hope, Llanfynydd, Pen-y-ffordd, Queensferry and Sealand, Saltney Ferry, Shotton East and Shotton Higher, Shotton West, and Treuddyn.

== Constituency profile ==
This Welsh seat on the English border is part of the industrial hinterland north of Wrexham and west of Chester, with large employers including Toyota, BAE and Airbus. The main population areas in the current seat include Flint, Shotton, Connah's Quay, Buckley, Hawarden and Caergwrle. It was formerly known as East Flintshire until the 1983 boundary review, in which it was renamed after the Alyn and Deeside district created in 1974.

== Members of Parliament ==
Election	Member	Party
1983	Barry Jones	Labour
2001	Mark Tami	Labour

== Elections ==
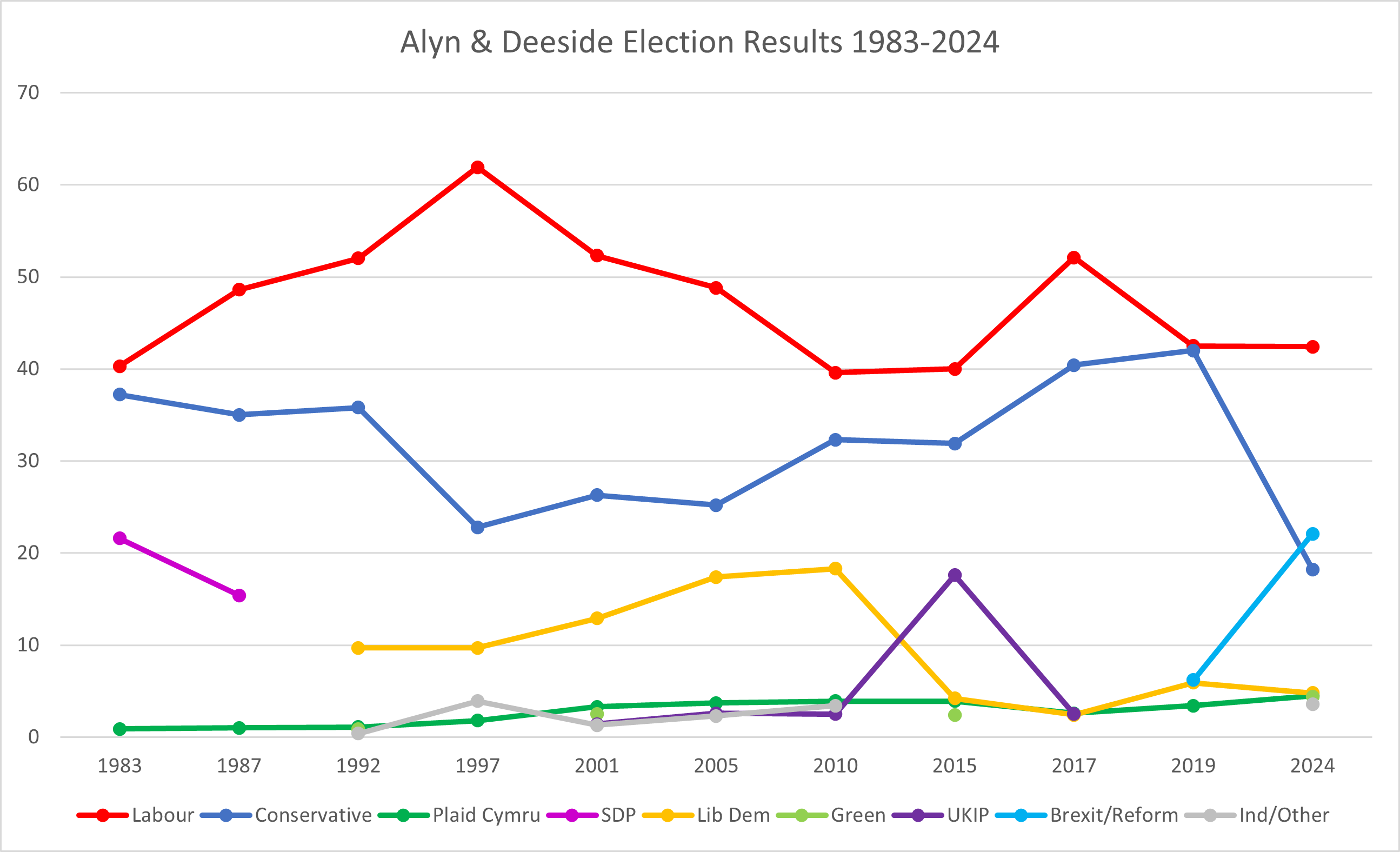
Alyn & Deeside Election Results 1983-2024

=== Elections in the 2020s ===
General election 2024: Alyn and Deeside
Party	Candidate	Votes	%	±%
Labour	Mark Tami	18,395	42.4	▼0.3
Reform	Vicki Roskams	9,601	22.1	▲16.1
Conservative	Jeremy Kent	7,892	18.2	▼23.8
Liberal Democrats	Richard Marbrow	2,065	4.8	▼1.1
Plaid Cymru	Jack Morris	1,938	4.5	▲1.1
Green	Karl Macnaughton	1,926	4.4	new
Independent	Edwin Duggan	1,575	3.6	new
Majority		8,794	20.3	▲19.6
Turnout		43,392	57.3	▼11.9
Registered electors		75,790		
Labour hold		Swing		

=== Elections in the 2010s ===
2019 notional result (Note: Estimate of the 2019 general election result as if the revised boundaries recommended under the 2023 boundary review were in place)
Party	Vote	%
Labour	22,374	42.7
Conservative	21,963	42.0
Brexit Party	3,137	6.0
Liberal Democrats	3,095	5.9
Plaid Cymru	1,781	3.4
Majority	411	0.8
Turnout	52,350	69.2
Electorate	75,695	

General election 2019: Alyn and Deeside
Party	Candidate	Votes	%	±%
Labour	Mark Tami	18,271	42.5	−9.6
Conservative	Sanjoy Sen	18,058	42.0	+1.6
Brexit Party	Simon Wall	2,678	6.2	N/A
Liberal Democrats	Donna Lalek	2,548	5.9	+3.5
Plaid Cymru	Susan Hills	1,453	3.4	+0.8
Rejected ballots		121		
Majority		213	0.5	−11.2
Turnout		43,008	68.5	−2.5
Registered electors		62,789		
Labour hold		Swing	−5.6	

Of the 121 rejected ballots:

- 103 were either unmarked or it was uncertain who the vote was for.
- 17 voted for more than one candidate.
- 1 had want of official mark.

General election 2017: Alyn and Deeside
Party	Candidate	Votes	%	±%
Labour	Mark Tami	23,315	52.1	+12.1
Conservative	Laura Knightly	18,080	40.4	+8.5
Plaid Cymru	Jacqui Hurst	1,171	2.6	−1.3
UKIP	David Griffiths	1,117	2.5	−15.1
Liberal Democrats	Pete Williams	1,077	2.4	−1.8
Rejected ballots		84		
Majority		5,235	11.7	+3.6
Turnout		44,760	71.0	+4.4
Registered electors		63,013		
Labour hold		Swing	+1.8	

Of the 84 rejected ballots:

- 63 were either unmarked or it was uncertain who the vote was for.
- 17 voted for more than one candidate.
- 4 had writing or mark by which the voter could be identified.

General election 2015: Alyn and Deeside
Party	Candidate	Votes	%	±%
Labour	Mark Tami	16,540	40.0	+0.4
Conservative	Laura Knightly	13,197	31.9	−0.4
UKIP	Blair Smillie	7,260	17.6	+15.1
Liberal Democrats	Tudor Jones	1,733	4.2	−14.1
Plaid Cymru	Jacqueline Hurst	1,608	3.9	0.0
Green	Alasdair Ibbotson	976	2.4	N/A
Rejected ballots		50		
Majority		3,343	8.1	+0.8
Turnout		41,314	66.6	+1.1
Registered electors		62,016		
Labour hold		Swing	+0.4	

Of the 50 rejected ballots:

- 41 were either unmarked or it was uncertain who the vote was for.
- 9 voted for more than one candidate.

In February 2015, the Conservative Party inadvertently leaked a list of non-target seats considered safe Labour, or where winning was considered highly unlikely, which included Alyn and Deeside. Independent Phil Woods announced he would stand, but did not do so.

General election 2010: Alyn and Deeside
Party	Candidate	Votes	%	±%
Labour	Mark Tami	15,804	39.6	−9.2
Conservative	Will Gallagher	12,885	32.3	+7.1
Liberal Democrats	Paul J. Brighton	7,308	18.3	+0.9
Plaid Cymru	Maurice Jones	1,549	3.9	+0.2
BNP	John Walker	1,368	3.4	N/A
UKIP	James Howson	1,009	2.5	−0.1
Majority		2,919	7.3	−16.3
Turnout		39,923	65.5	+5.3
Registered electors		60,931		
Labour hold		Swing	−8.1	

=== Elections in the 2000s ===
General election 2005: Alyn and Deeside
Party	Candidate	Votes	%	±%
Labour	Mark Tami	17,331	48.8	−3.5
Conservative	Lynne Hale	8,953	25.2	−1.1
Liberal Democrats	Paul J. Brighton	6,174	17.4	+4.5
Plaid Cymru	Richard Coombs	1,320	3.7	+0.4
UKIP	Billy Crawford	918	2.6	+1.2
Forward Wales	Klaus Armstrong-Braun	378	1.1	N/A
Independent	Judith Kilshaw	215	0.6	N/A
Communist	Glyn Davies	207	0.6	0.0
Majority		8,378	23.6	−2.4
Turnout		35,496	60.2	+1.6
Registered electors		59,441		
Labour hold		Swing	−1.2	

General election 2001: Alyn and Deeside
Party	Candidate	Votes	%	±%
Labour	Mark Tami	18,525	52.3	−9.6
Conservative	Mark Isherwood	9,303	26.3	+3.5
Liberal Democrats	Derek Burnham	4,585	12.9	+3.2
Plaid Cymru	Richard S. Coombs	1,182	3.3	+1.5
Green	Klaus Armstrong-Braun	881	2.5	N/A
UKIP	William Crawford	481	1.4	N/A
Independent	John Cooksey	253	0.7	N/A
Communist	Glyn Davies	211	0.6	N/A
Majority		9,222	26.0	−13.1
Turnout		35,421	58.6	−13.6
Registered electors		60,478		
Labour hold		Swing	−6.5	

=== Elections in the 1990s ===
General election 1997: Alyn and Deeside
Party	Candidate	Votes	%	±%
Labour	Barry Jones	25,955	61.9	+9.9
Conservative	Timothy P. Roberts	9,552	22.8	−13.0
Liberal Democrats	Eleanor Burnham	4,076	9.7	0.0
Referendum	Malcolm J. D. Jones	1,627	3.9	N/A
Plaid Cymru	Siw Hills	738	1.8	+0.7
Majority		16,403	39.1	+22.9
Turnout		41,948	72.2	−7.9
Registered electors		58,091		
Labour hold		Swing	+11.5	

General election 1992: Alyn and Deeside
Party	Candidate	Votes	%	±%
Labour	Barry Jones	25,206	52.0	+3.4
Conservative	Jeffrey J. Riley	17,355	35.8	+0.8
Liberal Democrats	Robert A. Britton	4,687	9.7	−5.7
Plaid Cymru	John D. Rogers	551	1.1	+0.1
Green	Victor J. Button	433	0.9	N/A
Independent	John Cooksey	200	0.4	N/A
Majority		7,851	16.2	+2.6
Turnout		48,432	80.1	−0.3
Registered electors		60,477		
Labour hold		Swing	+1.3	

=== Elections in the 1980s ===
General election 1987: Alyn and Deeside
Party	Candidate	Votes	%	±%
Labour	Barry Jones	22,916	48.6	+8.3
Conservative	Nicholas Twilley	16,500	35.0	−2.2
SDP	Eric Owen	7,273	15.4	−6.2
Plaid Cymru	John Rogers	478	1.0	+0.1
Majority		6,416	13.6	+10.5
Turnout		47,167	80.4	+2.3
Registered electors		58,764		
Labour hold		Swing	+5.3	

General election 1983: Alyn and Deeside
Party	Candidate	Votes	%	±%
Labour	Barry Jones	17,806	40.3	N/A
Conservative	Simon Burns	16,438	37.2	N/A
SDP	Eric Owen	9,535	21.6	N/A
Plaid Cymru	Keith Shore	413	0.9	N/A
Majority		1,368	3.1	N/A
Turnout		44,192	78.1	N/A
Registered electors		56,618		
Labour win (new seat)				

== See also ==
- Alyn and Deeside (Senedd constituency)
- List of parliamentary constituencies in Clwyd
- List of parliamentary constituencies in Wales
