= A541 road =

Road in North Wales

Coordinates: 53.16697°N 3.13295°W

A541

Route information
- Length: 26 mi (42 km)

Major junctions
- North end: Trefnant, Denbighshire
- A525 A543 A5119 A494 A549 A5118 A5104 A550 A483 A5152
- South end: Wrexham

Location
- Country: United Kingdom
- Primary destinations: Mold

Road network
- Roads in the United Kingdom; Motorways; A and B road zones

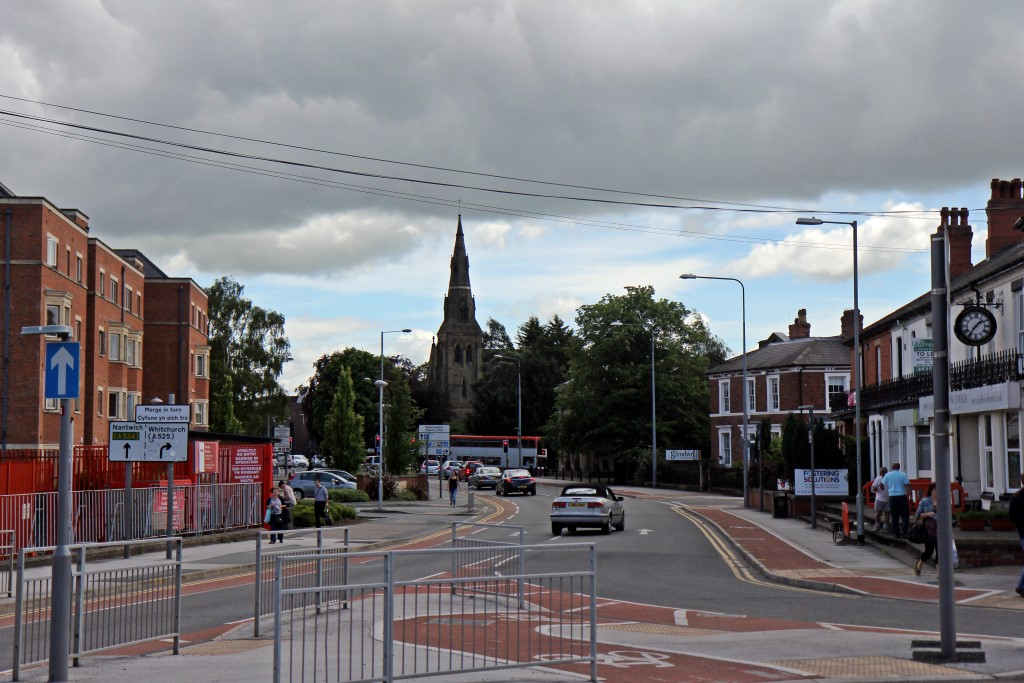
A541 Regent Street, in Wrexham, Wales.

The A541 is an A road in North Wales. The road starts on the A525 in Trefnant, between St Asaph and Denbigh, and ends in Wrexham. On the way, it passes the town of Mold. It also passes through many villages. In northern-central Wrexham it joins the B5101 road.

Prior to 2009, the section of the road between Mold and Denbigh, centered on Rhydymwyn, was described by North Wales Police as the most dangerous road in North Wales.
