= Luddendenfoot railway station =

Former railway station in Northern England

Luddendenfoot
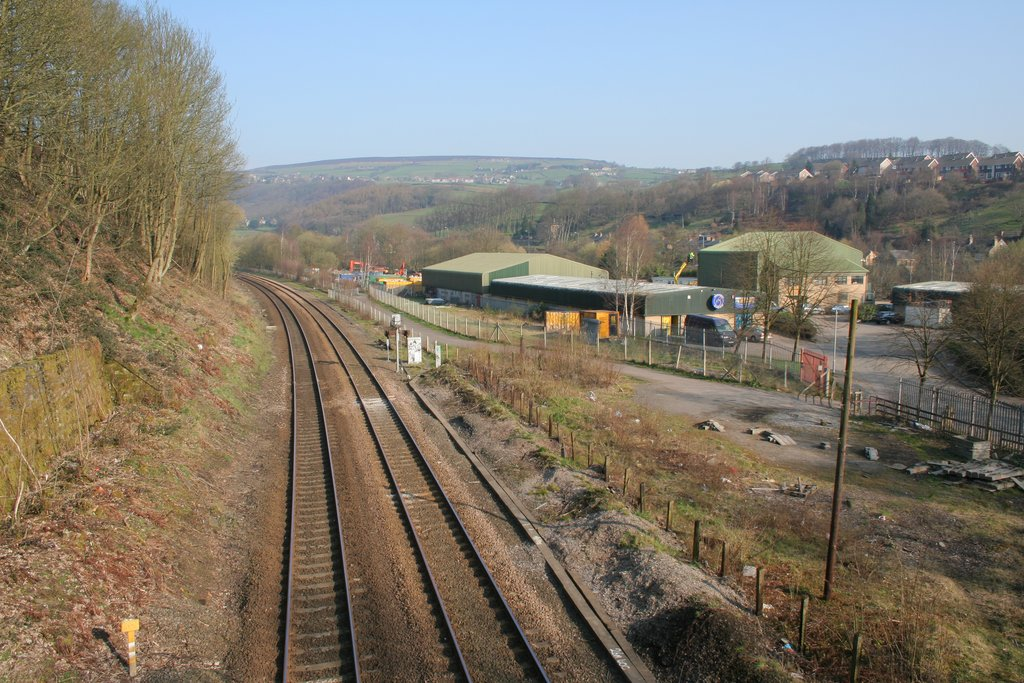
- site of station in 2007, looking north

General information
- Location: Luddendenfoot, Calderdale; England
- Coordinates: 53.721800°N 1.947450°W
- Grid reference: SE035250
- Platforms: 2

Other information
- Status: Disused

History
- Original company: Manchester and Leeds Railway
- Pre-grouping: Lancashire and Yorkshire Railway
- Post-grouping: London, Midland and Scottish Railway

Key dates
- 5 October 1840: Station opened
- 10 September 1962: Station closed
Location

Luddendenfoot railway station served the village of Luddendenfoot in West Yorkshire, England, from 1840 until 1962.

== History ==
The Manchester and Leeds Railway, which was authorised in 1836 for a line from Manchester to Normanton, was opened in stages; the second section, between Normanton and Hebden Bridge, opened on 5 October 1840, and one of the original stations was that at Luddendenfoot.

On 1 April 1841, Branwell Brontë was transferred from Sowerby Bridge and appointed 'clerk in charge' at Luddendenfoot at a salary of £130 per annum. Under him was a porter named Watson; and when Brontë went drinking, he left Watson in charge. Later, an audit of the station accounts showed a deficit of eleven pounds, one shilling and sevenpence, which Watson had probably stolen; but Brontë was dismissed, and also had to make up the shortfall from his outstanding salary.

In 1880 the bridge across the River Calder leading to the station was destroyed by a flood. The Luddendenfoot Local Board of Health commissioned the new Boy Bridge from Halifax architects Utley and Grey, with James Wild, a local stonemason and ironwork by Wood Brothers of Sowerby Bridge. James Wild also built the Station Bridge over the Rochdale Canal. The Lancashire and Yorkshire Railway contributed £1,625 to the cost of rebuilding the bridge and it was completed in 1882.

Two fatal accidents occurred close to the station before its closure - the first in 1925 and the second thirty years later in 1955.

The station closed on 10 September 1962.

The site has been developed since 2007 and the northern half is now occupied by the Station Industrial Park, which is accessible via Old Station Road. Two gate pillars from the original station flank the entrance to the road.

Preceding station	Historical railways	Following station
Mytholmroyd	L&YR; Caldervale Line	Sowerby Bridge
