= Mytholmroyd railway station =

Railway station in Northern England

Mytholmroyd
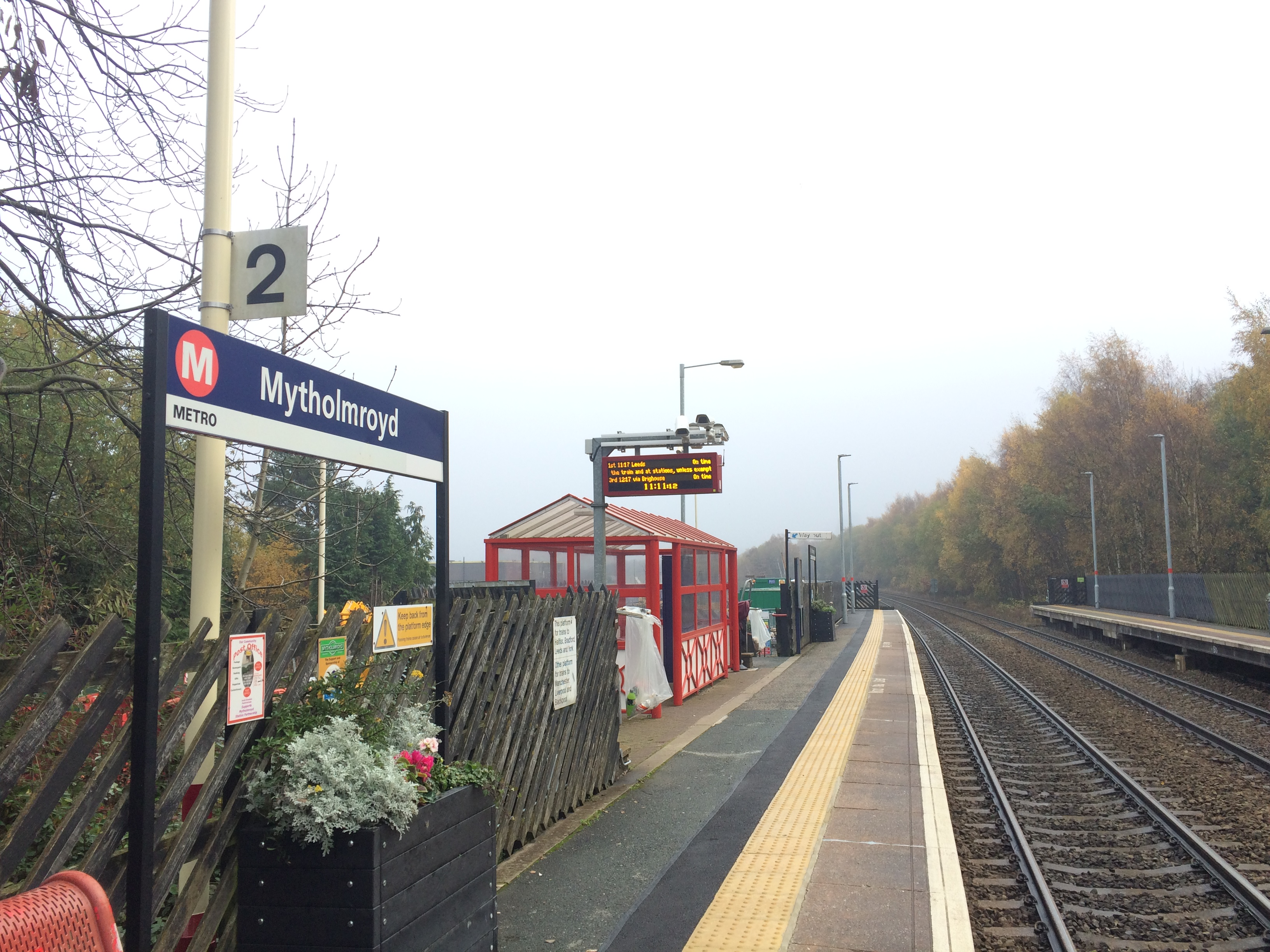
- Platform 2 at Mytholmroyd

General information
- Location: Mytholmroyd, Calderdale; England
- Coordinates: 53.729120°N 1.981840°W
- Grid reference: SE012258
- Managed by: Northern
- Transit authority: West Yorkshire (Metro)
- Platforms: 2

Other information
- Station code: MYT
- Fare zone: 5
- Classification: DfT category F1

History
- Original company: Manchester and Leeds Railway
- Pre-grouping: Lancashire and Yorkshire Railway
- Post-grouping: London, Midland and Scottish Railway

Key dates
- 5 October 1840: Line opened
- May 1847: Station opened

Passengers
- 2020/21: ▼45,912
- 2021/22: ▲0.136 million
- 2022/23: ▲0.157 million
- 2023/24: ▲0.169 million
- 2024/25: ▲0.196 million
Location
Notes
- Passenger statistics from the Office of Rail and Road

Mytholmroyd railway station serves the communities of Mytholmroyd, Luddendenfoot, Midgley, Cragg Vale, and surrounding areas in West Yorkshire, England. It has disabled access via ramps instead of steps on both platforms, unusually as the station is built on a viaduct. It lies on the Calder Valley Line operated by Northern and is situated 7.5 miles (12 km) west of Halifax and 25 miles (40 km) west of Leeds.

== History ==
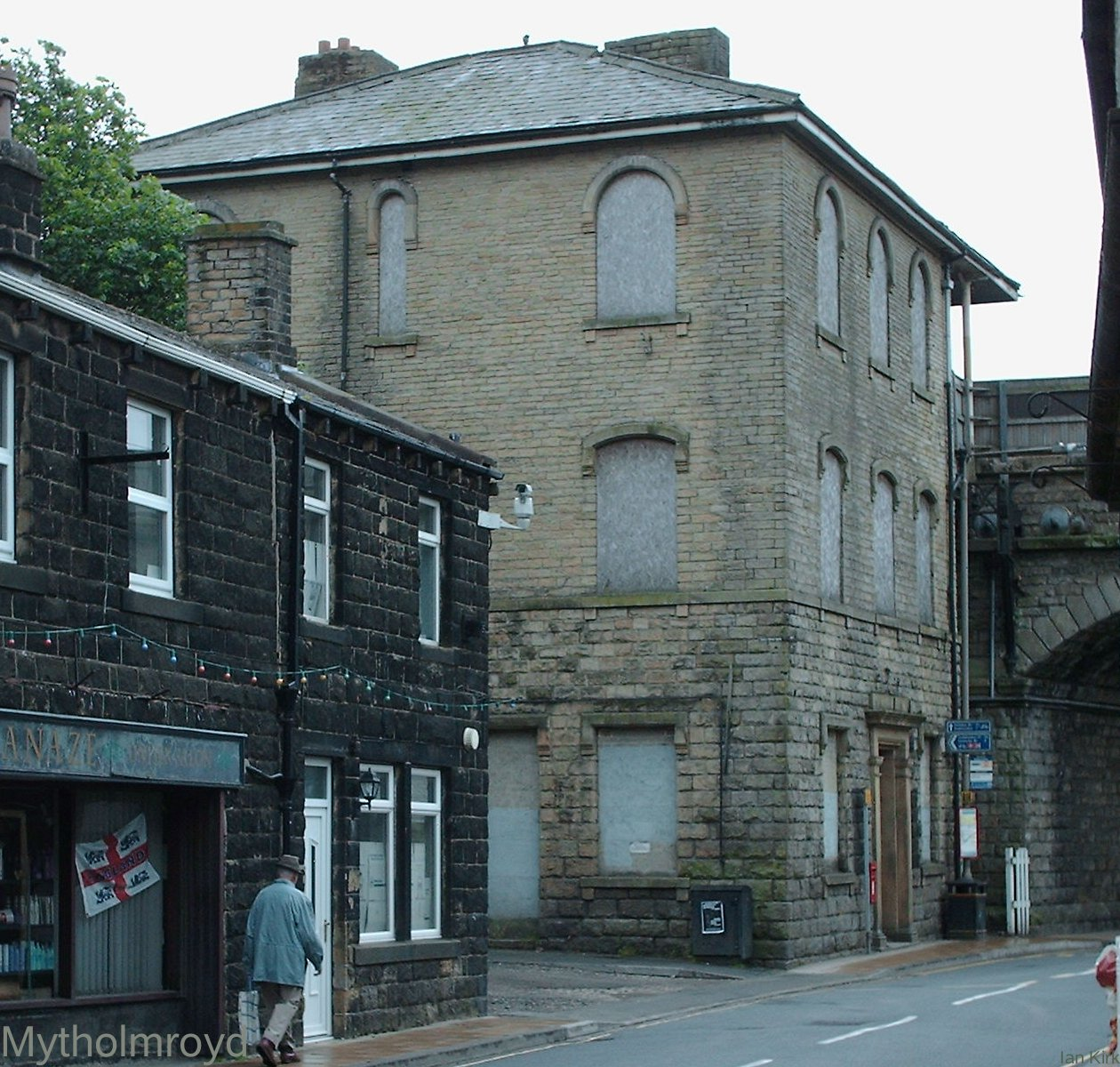
Old station building on New Road

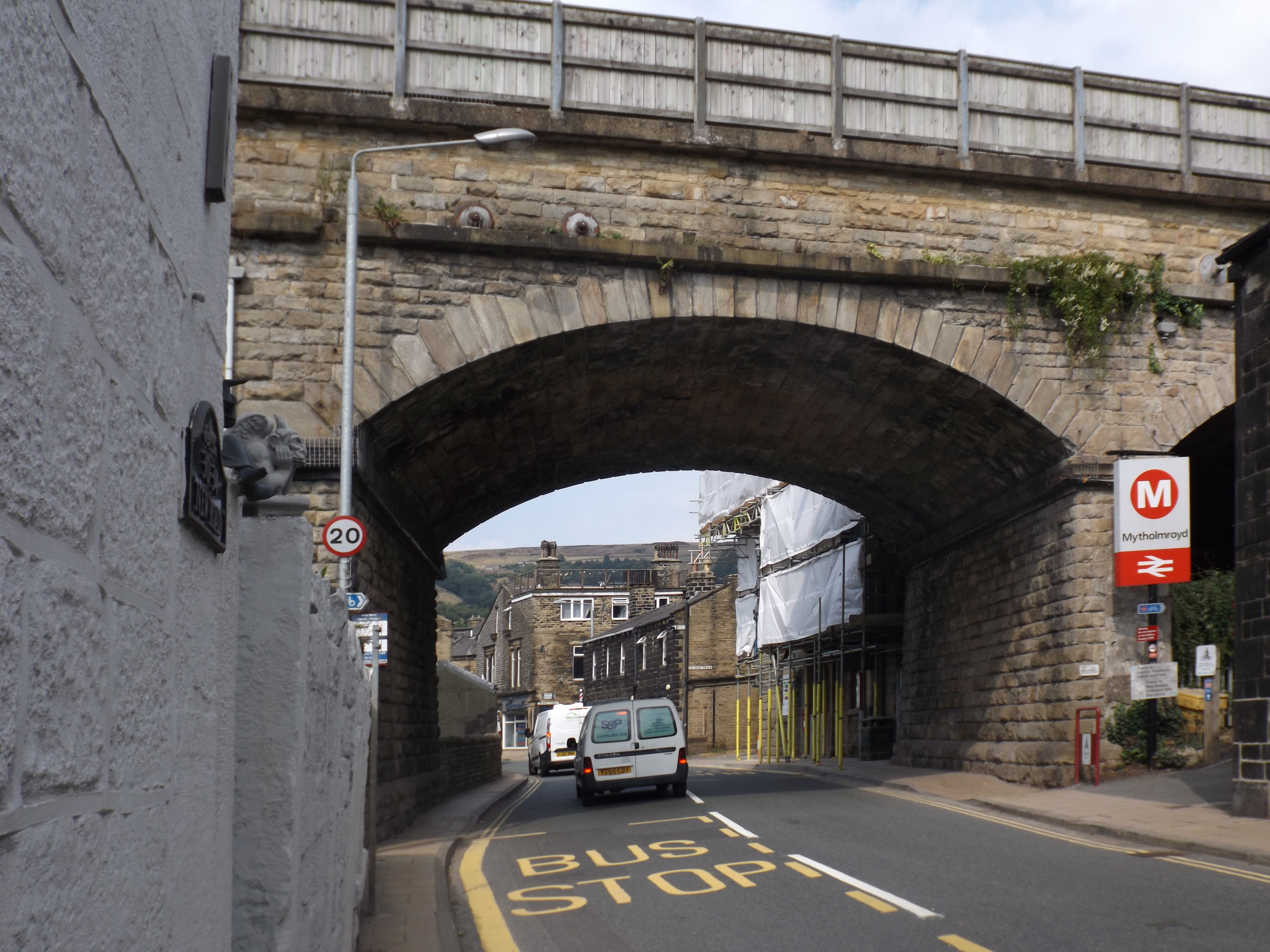
Entrance to the station from below the viaduct

The Manchester and Leeds Railway (M&LR) was opened in stages. The section between Normanton and Hebden Bridge was opened on 5 October 1840 and completed in 1841, without a station between Luddendenfoot and Hebden Bridge.

The station was opened by the M&LR in May 1847; within a few weeks of this, the company became the Lancashire and Yorkshire Railway.

== Facilities ==
The entrance to the station is by way of two long step-free paths from each side of the Mytholmroyd Viaduct. The original station building (as seen above) included a ticket office, as the main entrance to both platforms. The station building was later closed and tickets had to be purchased on the train but later sheltered ticket machines were installed on platform 2, payable by card. Northern's online 'click and collect' system Application, allows the user to purchase tickets, which are then collected on Platform 2. In October 2004, the first arch of the viaduct on the access ramp was cleaned, the path was extended and new fencing was installed. Two live information screens have been added showing the trains service, type and stops / calls. In 2013, a bicycle area was added at the top of one of the ramps, covered by CCTV.

In August 2016, planning permission was granted to return the station into commercial use. The planning permission allowed for the floors to be ripped out and reinstated, fireplaces to be refurbished and floors / windows to be installed. The station partnership is currently looking for the community to develop a business plan to use the building for community use. Ideas raised include a 'Ted Hughes' museum, bar and cafe. There is an active station user group - Mytholmroyd Station Partnership, which has enhanced the station area with gardens, flower tubs and school art - including the Northern Mosaic by students from Calder High School. A car park, at the top of platform 2 access road, which engineers use to get machinery onto the tracks in the area, will be completed as of Winter 2020 with near 200 spaces including e-car charging facilities as well as car club spaces and secure cycle lockers.

== Services ==
The station has seen its daytime service cut significantly at the winter 2019 timetable change, as the York to Blackpool service no longer calls here on weekdays. There are now two trains per hour each way, both running to Leeds eastbound (one via Bradford, the other via Brighouse) and Manchester Victoria westbound; the latter then continue to either Chester or Wigan Wallgate.

On Sundays, the Leeds to Chester via Manchester Victoria and York to Blackpool North trains both call hourly.

Preceding station	National Rail	Following station
Hebden Bridge	Northern; Caldervale Line	Sowerby Bridge
	Historical railways	
Hebden Bridge	L&YR; Caldervale Line	Luddendenfoot

== See also ==
- Listed buildings in Hebden Royd
