= Hebden Bridge Picture House =

Picture house in Hebden Bridge, West Yorkshire, England

Coordinates: 53.7409°N 2.0124°W

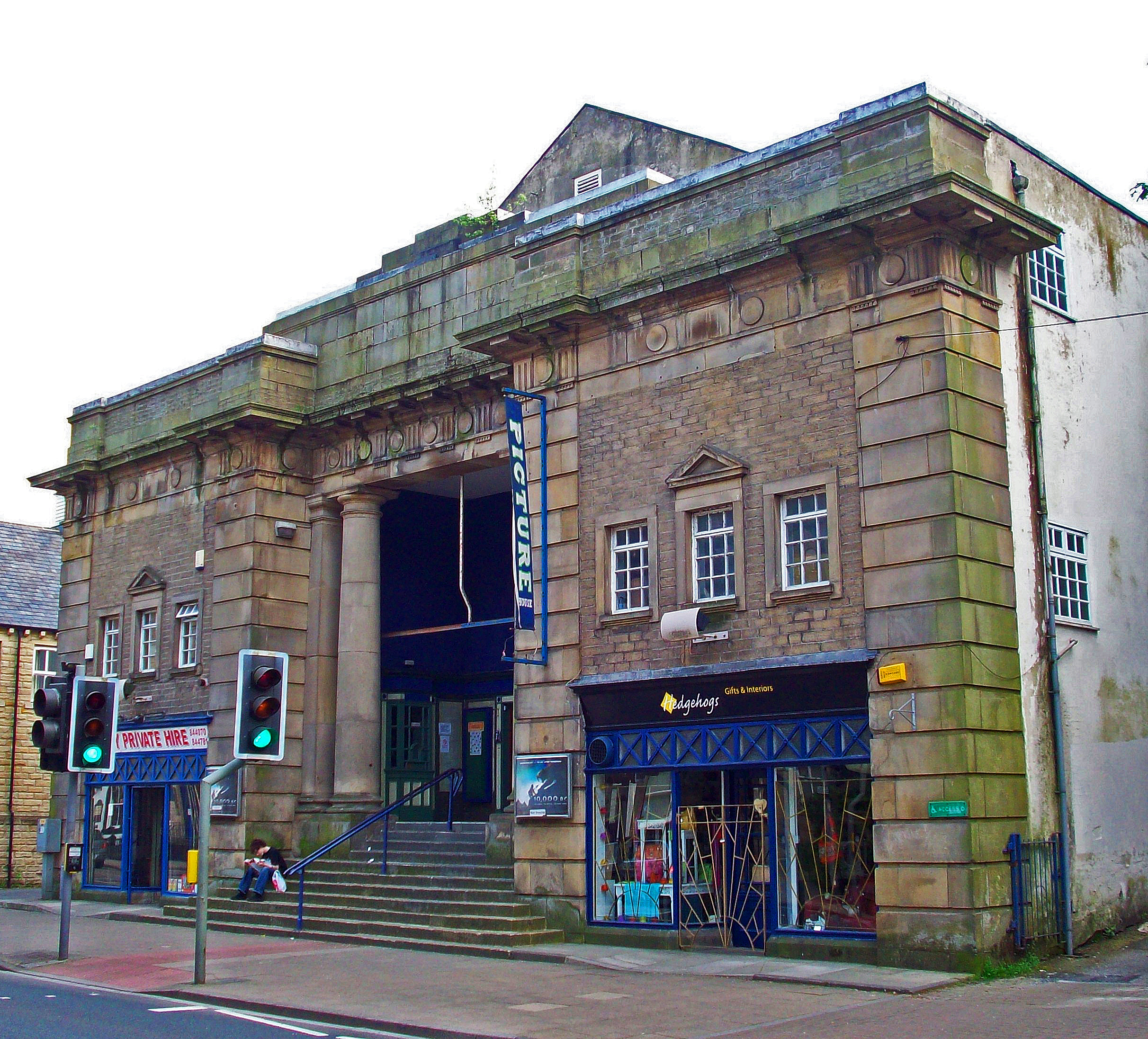
Hebden Bridge Picture House

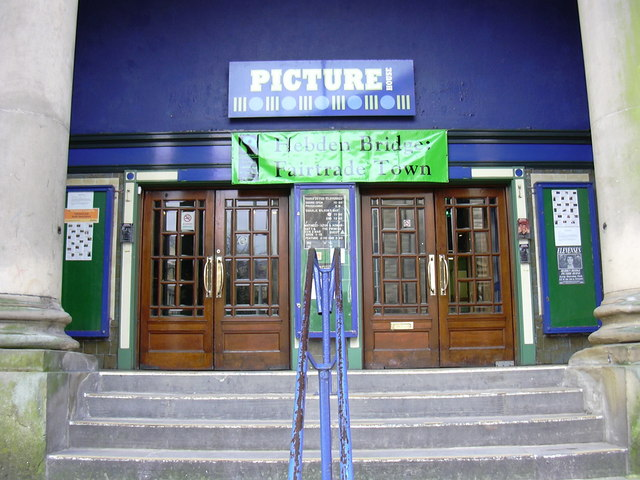
Hebden Bridge Picture House

Hebden Bridge Picture House in Hebden Bridge, West Yorkshire, is a cinema that's owned and run by Hebden Royd town council. Together with the adjacent shops, it forms a Grade II listed building.

The Picture House, built between 1919-1921, is an independent cinema with daily evening screenings, weekend matinees and tea time screenings, and matinees most days during school holidays. There is a screening every Thursday morning, at which free tea and biscuits are provided. It also screens live broadcasts of theatre, opera, ballet, music and arts documentaries via satellite. It has both digital and 35mm projection facilities. It has one screen with over 500 seats, and mainly operates from the stalls (accessible) seating downstairs. It has a kiosk serving hot and cold drinks, cake, popcorn, sweets, chocolates and savoury snacks.

The Picture House offers a wide-ranging programme of film and live events. It shows anywhere between 16 and 26 films per month, ranging from mainstream and blockbuster to art-house and foreign language films. There are regular screenings of specialist films and touring programmes from a range of organisations, including the British Film Institute. Certain screenings come with subtitles and / or audio description.

== History ==
Hebden Bridge's Picture House cinema first opened its doors in 1921 and is one of the last civic-owned cinemas in Britain. Originally boasting over 900 seats, its first screening was a double bill of Torn Sails and The Iron Stair. The venue became the main place of entertainment for the weavers, mill-workers, and other residents of Hebden Bridge and the upper Calder Valley and has been in continuous use as a cinema.

In the late 1960s, when many of the mills had closed, the Picture House itself was near to closure. It was saved for the town by the actions of the then Hebden Royd Urban District Council (HRUDC) who purchased it from private ownership for about £6,000. The cinema passed into the control of Calderdale Metropolitan Borough Council (CMBC) when local government was reorganised in 1974. CMBC oversaw a refurbishment in 1978, removing half of the seats to bring the total to the current figure of 492.

In 1999, the future of the Picture House again appeared to be at risk when the site was earmarked for development. A community campaign called Friends of the Picture House emerged and a mass lobby of the CMBC in July 1999 resulted in the development plans being rejected.

Today, typically, between 15 and 26 films are shown each month. The programming deliberately caters for all tastes, ranging from mainstream Hollywood to art-house and foreign language films.

2012 saw the transfer of the Picture House to Hebden Royd Town Council, a successor to HRUDC. Since then there have been many upgrades and improvements to the cinema, the most important of which has been the installation of digital projection, ensuring the Picture House can continue to screen the latest film releases.

== Friends ==
The Friends of the Picture House is a voluntary group that represents everyone who uses the Picture House. Its elected committee meet regularly to consider what its members want from the Picture House and how the Friends can ensure that the cinema continues to thrive. Two members of the Friends attend the Town Council's Picture House management committee meetings to ensure that the views of the cinema-goers are well represented.

Membership of the Friends is free and open to anyone who has an interest in seeing the Picture House continue to cater for the diverse interests of its customers.

== See also ==
- Listed buildings in Hebden Royd
