= Listed buildings in Hebden Royd =

Hebden Royd is a civil parish in the metropolitan borough of Calderdale, West Yorkshire, England. It contains 254 listed buildings that are recorded in the National Heritage List for England. Of these, twelve are at Grade II*, the middle of the three grades, and the others are at Grade II, the lowest grade. The parish contains the market town of Hebden Bridge, the large village of Mytholmroyd, the valley to the south of Mytholmroyd which contains the village of Cragg Vale, and the surrounding area.

Most of the listed buildings in the parish are houses and associated structures, cottages, farmhouses, and farm buildings. Almost all the buildings are in stone with stone slate roofs, and most of the windows are mullioned. The River Calder and the Rochdale Canal run through the parish, and the listed buildings associated with these are bridges, locks, an aqueduct, two overflow facilities, and a lock-keeper's house. The railway built by the Manchester and Leeds Railway also runs through the parish, and the listed buildings associated with this are two viaducts, parts of Mytholmroyd railway station and Hebden Bridge railway station, the latter built later by the Lancashire and Yorkshire Railway, and a signal box. The other listed buildings include road bridges and footbridges, boundary stones, guide posts, milestones, public houses, former mills, factories and workshops, churches and chapels, some of which have been converted for other purposes, a school, former public buildings, a cinema, two war memorials, and a telephone kiosk.

== Key ==
Grade	Criteria
II*	Particularly important buildings of more than special interest
II	Buildings of national importance and special interest

== Buildings ==
Name and location	Photograph	Date	Notes	Grade
Broad Bottom Old Hall; 53.73578°N 1.98961°W		Late medieval	A timber framed hall that was encased in stone in the 16th century. It has a stone slate roof with coped gables and kneelers, and consists of a two-storey cross-wing. The doorway has a chamfered surround and a segmental-arched lintel. All the windows have chamfered mullions, some also with transoms.	II*
Wadsworth Banks Farmhouse; 53.73727°N 1.97869°W		Late medieval	A timber framed house that has been gradually encased in stone. It has a blue slate roof, two storeys, and an L-shaped plan consisting of a hall range, and a cross-wing on a plinth with a coped gable, kneelers and a finial. The windows are chamfered with mullions, some also with transoms and hood moulds. In the hall range is an eight-light window with a six-light window above. The cross-wing contains an inserted doorway with monolithic jambs.	II*
The Old Bridge over the Hebden Water; 53.74202°N 2.01331°W		c. 1510	Originally a packhorse bridge and subsequently repaired, it is in stone and consists of three segmental arches. The bridge has chamfered cutwaters, on the southwest side rising to the height of the parapet, and on the other side capped off at level. On the bridge are three inscribed date plaques. The bridge is also a scheduled monument.	II*
Barn north of Lower Hathershelf; 53.72373°N 1.96168°W	—	Early 16th century	The barn has a timber framed core, it was later encased in stone, and has coped gables with kneelers. It has a T-shaped plan, and internally is double-aisled. The barn contains wide cart entries, doorways with chamfered surrounds, and chamfered rectangular arrow-slit vents.	II*
Churn Milk Joan or Savile's Lowe; 53.74562°N 1.97147°W		16th century (possible)	An upright stone marking the boundary between two townships, it is about 7 feet (2.1 m) high. The stone has a rectangular plan, with sides of about 15 inches (380 mm) and 11 inches (280 mm), and is broader towards the bottom. On the stone is a bench mark.	II
Brearley Hall; 53.72976°N 1.95539°W	—	Late 16th century	The house has a timber framed core, and is encased in stone. It has a stone slate roof with coped gables, kneelers, and crocketed finials. There are two storeys, and an H-shaped plan, consisting of a hall and cross-wings. On the front is a two-storey gabled porch that has a tall doorway with a moulded surround and a Tudor arched lintel. All the windows are mullioned with hood moulds.	II*
Great Burlees; 53.73974°N 2.00133°W	—	Late 16th century	The house was extended in the 17th century to from an H-shaped plan, consisting of a hall range and two cross-wings, and there is also a rear kitchen wing. It is in stone and has a stone slate roof with coped gables and kneelers. There are two storeys and an attic, and the windows have mullions, and many also have transoms. The west wing is the oldest part, and has a 19th-century porch and a 16th-century doorway with a chamfered surround. The hall range contains a 20-light window, an eight-light window in a gabled dormer above, and a doorway with a chamfered surround and a depressed arched lintel. In the east wing is a string course, and ten-light windows in both floors.	II*
Great Mount; 53.74269°N 1.98716°W	—	Late 16th century	A house, later used as a club house, it is in stone and has a stone slate roof with a coped gable on the right. There are two storeys, a hall range, a projecting cross-wing, and a lean-to porch with a doorway that has a chamfered surround. The windows in the ground floor have chamfered moulded mullions and a continuous hood mould above, and the windows in the upper floor have been altered.	II
Higher Cragg; 53.71784°N 1.99768°W	—	Late 16th century	A stone house with a modern tile roof, two storeys and three bays. The doorway has a pointed arch, and all the windows are chamfered and mullioned, with moulded mullions.	II
Barn northeast of Higher Cragg; 53.71797°N 1.99750°W	—	Late 16th century	The barn is in stone and has a stone slate roof with coped gables, kneelers and a finial. It has three bays and an aisle. The cart entries, doorways, and vents have chamfered surrounds.	II
Hoo Hole Farmhouse and rear wing 53.72464°N 1.99047°W	—	Late 16th century	The oldest part is a cross-wing, which is attached to the 18th-century former kitchen wing of a house that has been replaced. The building is in stone with a stone slate roof, and both parts contain mullioned windows. The cross-wing has a coped gable with kneelers, and two inserted doorways. The kitchen wing contains a doorway with a depressed Tudor arched lintel.	II
Barn southwest of Hoo Hole Farmhouse; 53.72447°N 1.99070°W	—	Late 16th century	The double-aisled barn is in stone, and has a stone slate roof with coped gables and kneelers. In the gable end is a doorway with a Tudor arched lintel, and arched and chamfered rectangular vents. The right return contains a doorway and a mullioned window.	II
Redacre House; 53.73274°N 1.98328°W		Late 16th century|	The house is in stone, with a stone slate roof that has coped gables and kneelers. There are two storeys and an F-shaped plan, with a front of four bays, the right bay consisting of a projecting gabled cross-wing, and with a projecting a two-storey gabled porch in the second bay. The windows are chamfered with moulded mullions. In the left bay is an altered window, above which is a single arched light with spandrels, and a gabled dormer. The upper storey of the porch is jettied on a moulded cornice, and the doorway has a moulded surround and a Tudor arch. In the third bay is a dormer window with a carved ball on the apex. The cross-wing contains an inserted doorway with monolithic jambs, and at the rear is a doorway with a chamfered surround and a pointed arch.	II*
Wadsworth Royd Farmhouse; 53.73710°N 1.98134°W		Late 16th century	The farmhouse is in stone, and has a stone slate roof with coped gables, kneelers, and a base for a finial. There are two storeys and an L-shaped plan, consisting of a three-bay hall range, and a projecting gabled cross-wing. Most of the windows are chamfered with mullions, some also have hood moulds, and in the cross-wing are inserted sash windows. The doorway has a chamfered surround, composite jambs and a heavy monolithic lintel.	II
Windle Hill; 53.71825°N 1.98138°W	—	Late 16th century	The house is in stone and has a stone slate roof with a coped gable and kneelers. There is one storey and an attic, floors at different levels following the line of the hill, and three bays. All the windows have moulded surrounds and mullions, and the doorway at the rear in a lean-to has a moulded surround.	II*
White Lee, White Lee House and archway 53.73205°N 1.97804°W	—	1607	A house that was later extended and divided into two dwellings, it is in stone with a string course, and has a stone slate roof with coped gables and kneelers. There are two storeys and three bays. The windows are mullioned, there is a doorway with a dated lintel, and another doorway with monolithic jambs. At the north corner of the rear of the house is a tall semicircular arched entry to rear courtyard with a moulded impost.	II
Old Cragg Hall; 53.70810°N 2.00404°W		1617	The house is in stone on a plinth, with a moulded string course, and a stone slate roof that has coping gables with kneelers, ball finials, and carved faces on the apex stones. There are two storeys, and an F-shaped plan, with a front of five bays. The left two bays have a double-depth plan, and protrude with two gables and a two-span roof. In the fourth bay is a two-storey gabled porch, with a jettied upper storey. The entrance has a moulded surround, and a dated depressed Tudor arch lintel. Above this is a carved heraldic tablet. The windows are chamfered and mullioned, and some also have transoms.	II
Banks Farmhouse and Banks Cottages; 53.73732°N 1.97806°W	—	Early 17th century (possible)	A barn that was altered in the 19th century to form cottages. It is in stone and has coped gables with kneelers. The barn contains a segmental-arched cart entry with a chamfered surround and inscribed voussoirs, and the windows are mullioned. The two cottages each has a doorway with monolithic jambs, and mullioned windows.	II
Frost Hole; 53.72056°N 2.00152°W	—	Early 17th century	The house, which was extended in the 19th century, is in stone with a stone slate roof. There are two storeys, three bays, and the remains of a kitchen at the rear. The doorway has a chamfered surround, composite jambs, and a straight lintel. The windows have mullions, and some also have transoms.	II
Great Stubb and Stubb; 53.73196°N 1.99460°W	—	Early 17th century	A house later subdivided, it is in stone with a string course, and has a stone slate roof with coped gables and kneelers. There are two storeys and an H-shaped plan, consisting of a three-bay hall range and cross-wings, and there is also a rear kitchen wing. The doorway has a chamfered surround, and the windows are chamfered and mullioned, most with moulded mullions.	II
Hill House Farmhouse and Cottage; 53.73675°N 1.98360°W	—	Early 17th century	The house is in stone, and has a stone slate roof with coped gables and kneelers. There are two storeys, three bays, the right bay projecting, and a single-storey wing, and the house is flanked by single-storey buildings with quoins. The windows are chamfered and most have mullions. On the front is a lean-to porch and a doorway with composite jambs, and a monolithic lintel, and at the rear is an open gabled porch dated 1698.	II
Lower Clough Foot; 53.71958°N 1.98982°W	—	Early 17th century	A stone house with a stone slate roof. There are two storeys and an L-shaped plan, with a three-bay front range, a rear dairy and a lean-to extension, and a projecting wing to the north. Most of the windows have mullions, some have been altered, and the doorway has been moved.	II
Lower Han Royd; 53.73688°N 1.96562°W	—	Early 17th century	A house and attached barn in stone with stone slate roofs. The house has two storeys and two bays, and mullioned windows. At the junction of the house and the barn is a porch with a coped gable and kneelers, an entrance with a moulded surround, and a dated and initialled lintel, and the inner doorway has a chamfered surround. The barn contains a cart entry with a chamfered surround.	II
May Royd; 53.73817°N 2.00497°W	—	Early 17th century	The stone house originated as a hall range and a cross-wing, and a further wing was added to the south in the 19th century. Most of the windows in the hall range and cross-wing to the right are mullioned and transomed, those in the ground floor with a continuous hood mould. In the apex of the cross-wing is a dovecote, and in the right return is a stair window. The later wing to the left has a plinth, five bays, an eaves band, and a coped gable, and the windows are sashes.	II
Park Fold; 53.72853°N 1.99899°W	—	Early 17th century	A wing was added in 1641. The house is in stone and has stone slate roofs with coped gables and kneelers. The house has two storeys and the original range has a front of two bays. The wing has a plinth and a moulded string course. The windows are chamfered with mullions and hood moulds, and in the gable end of the wing is a 16-light window above an eight-light window. In the wing is a doorway with an elaborately moulded surround, and a depressed Tudor arched lintel with the date and initials. In the main range is a doorway with monolithic jambs.	II
Throstle Nest Farmhouse; 53.72861°N 1.98808°W	—	Early 17th century	The farmhouse is in stone with a string course, and a stone slate roof that has coped gables and kneelers. There are two storeys and an attic, a main range of three bays, and at the rear is a half-aisle and a one-bay kitchen wing at right angles, forming a T-shaped plan. The doorway has a chamfered surround and a Tudor arched lintel inscribed with initials and a date. The windows are chamfered with mullions.	II
Upper Clough Foot; 53.71759°N 1.98957°W	—	Early 17th century	A stone house that has a stone slate roof with coped gables and kneelers. There are two storeys, three bays, and a gabled outshut containing a doorway. At the rear is a blocked doorway with a chamfered surround, and a heavy lintel, and the windows are chamfered with mullions.	II
Barn north of Upper Clough Foot; 53.71778°N 1.98953°W	—	Early 17th century (probable)	The barn is in stone, and has a stone slate roof with coped gables. There is a central cart entry with a monolithic lintel and a chamfered surround. Flanking it are doorways, the one to the left with a deep lintel, composite jambs, and a chamfered surround. The doorway to the right has monolithic jambs, and elsewhere are rectangular chamfered vents.	II
Weather Hill; 53.71233°N 1.98255°W	—	Early 17th century	A stone house that has a stone slate roof with a coped gable and moulded kneelers. There are two storeys, two bays, and a later kitchen wing. The windows are chamfered and mullioned. In the main range is a blocked doorway with monolithic jambs, and in the kitchen wing is a lean-to porch and a doorway with a depressed Tudor arch.	II
Wheatley Royd Farmhouse; 53.72736°N 1.95774°W	—	Early 17th century	A stone house that has a stone slate roof with coped gables and kneelers. There are two storeys, reducing to one storey at the service end, a main range of three bays, and a projecting cross-wing with a moulded string course. The windows are chamfered with mullions, some also have transoms, and some have hood moulds. The main doorway has a chamfered surround, composite jambs, a Tudor arched lintel, and a decorative hood mould, and there is an inserted doorway with monolithic jambs.	II
Barn southwest of Wood Top; 53.71323°N 1.98331°W	—	Early 17th century	The barn is in stone with quoins and a stone slate roof, and it has two storeys and two aisles. It contains a square-headed cart entry on the front, two arched doorways, and a room with a warehouse above entered by an upper floor doorway. At the rear in another square-headed cart entry and a doorway, both with chamfered surrounds, and arrow-slit vents.	II
Stannery End; 53.72148°N 1.97580°W	—	1629	A stone house that has a stone slate roof with coped gables and kneelers. There are two storeys, a single-storey aisle, and a two-storey kitchen wing at the rear. Most of the windows are chamfered with mullions and hood moulds. On the front is a doorway that has a chamfered surround, composite jambs, and a dated Tudor arched lintel. There is another doorway at the rear with a chamfered surround and a depressed arch, and in the right return is an inserted doorway with monolithic jambs.	II
Stocks Spring; 53.71536°N 1.98291°W		c. 1635	A stone house with a stone slate roof. There are two storeys, three bays, and a rear kitchen wing. The windows are double chamfered with mullions, and some have hood moulds, and the doorway has a chamfered surround and a depressed Tudor arch.	II
Mytholmroyd Farmhouse; 53.72825°N 1.98278°W		Early to mid 17th century	The house has a timber framed core, with external walls in stone. and a stone slate roof. There are two storeys, and a T-shaped plan, consisting of a hall range and a projecting cross-wing. On the front of the house are two gables with kneelers and an apex stone carved with a fleur-de-lys. The windows are chamfered and mullioned, most have hood moulds, some have transoms, and they have up to ten lights. The main doorway has a chamfered surround, composite jambs, and a Tudor arched lintel.	II*
Little Burlees Farmhouse and barn 53.74034°N 1.99934°W	—	1637	The porch was added in 1733 and the barn in the 18th century. The house is in stone with quoins, and has a stone slate roof with coped gables and kneelers. There are two storeys and a F-shaped plan, with a front of five bays, the left bay being a projecting wing, and in the middle bay is a porch. The windows are mullioned, some also with transoms; in the main range is an 18-light window and above it is a stepped window of four over six lights. The porch is gabled, it has two storeys, rusticated quoins, a semicircular-arched doorway with a dropped keystone, and a moulded impost. The inner doorway has a chamfered surround and a dated depressed Tudor arched lintel. Above the porch is an inscribed and dated tablet. The barn projects and has a gabled porch with a semicircular-arched cart entry, and there is a similar entry at the rear.	II*
Wood Top, Cragg Vale; 53.71339°N 1.98320°W	—	1637	A stone house with a stone slate roof, two storeys, and three bays. The windows are mullioned, some with a chamfered surround and some with a moulded surround; some also have hood moulds. The doorway has a chamfered surround, composite jambs, and a Tudor arched lintel with the date in a tressure.	II
Brearley Old Hall; 53.73118°N 1.96068°W	—	1638	The house was altered in 1678, and the south front was rebuilt in the 19th century. It is in stone, and has a stone slate roof with coped gables. The oldest part is at the rear, where there is a doorway with a chamfered surround and a depressed Tudor arched lintel. At the front are four bays. The left bay has a single storey containing an inserted doorway with monolithic jambs. The other three bays have two storeys and are symmetrical; they contain a doorway with an architrave, an entablature, and a cornice. All the windows have mullions, some also have transoms, and some have hood moulds. In the right return is a blocked doorway with an architrave and a dated keystone.	II
Bank Top, Cragg Vale; 53.70348°N 1.99625°W	—	Mid 17th century	A stone house, partly rendered, with quoins, and coped gables with kneelers. There are two storeys, a double-depth plan, and two bays. The doorway has composite jambs, and a Tudor arched dated lintel. The windows are mullioned, some with arched lights, and some with hood moulds.	II
Bell House, Cragg Vale; 53.71826°N 2.00735°W		Mid 17th century	An outshut was added to the rear of the house in the 18th century. The house is in stone with a stone slate roof, and has two storeys and two bays. The door to the left has a chamfered surround, composite jambs, and a Tudor arched lintel. The windows contain chamfered mullions.	II
Birchen Lee Carr and barn 53.73666°N 1.97993°W	—	Mid 17th century	The rear kitchen wing was added in about 1673, and the barn in 1886. The house is in stone on a plinth, with quoins, a string course, and a stone slate roof with coped gables and kneelers. There are two storeys, two bays project forward and are gabled, the doorway has a moulded surround. All the windows are mullioned, some with hood moulds, the main window has 16 lights, and the parlour window has three over five lights. The attached barn has an elliptically-arched cart entry with an inscribed and dated keystone, and above is a circular pitching hole with four keystones. The barn also contains doorways, mullioned windows and arrow-slit vents.	II*
Elphaborough Hall; 53.72999°N 1.98377°W	—	Mid 17th century	The house, which was enlarged in the 19th century, is in stone with quoins and gutter brackets, and has a stone slate roof with coped gables and kneelers. There are two storeys and two bays. The windows in the ground floor are mullioned, and in the upper floor they are sashes. In the left return is a doorway and two blocked taking-in doors.	II
Higher Cragg Farmhouse; 53.71786°N 1.99716°W	—	17th century	The farmhouse, which was extended in the 19th century, is in stone and has a stone slate roof with a coped gable on the right. There are two storeys, a T-shaped plan, and a south front of two bays. The doorway has a dated lintel, and the windows are mullioned.	II
Barn west of Hill House Farmhouse; 53.73675°N 1.98393°W	—	17th century (probable)	The barn is in stone, and has a stone slate roof with a coped left gable and kneelers. It contains square-headed cart entries, and doorways, one with composite jambs and a chamfered surround. In the left return are arrow slit vents.	II
Barn at rear of Little Stubb; 53.73193°N 1.99506°W	—	Mid 17th century	The barn is of cruck construction, encased in stone, and has a stone slate roof. There is a T-shaped plan, it has 1½ aisles, and contains square-headed cart entries and doorways. Inside, there are full base crucks with collars.	II
Lower Ewood; 53.73281°N 1.96616°W		Mid 17th century	A stone house with a stone slate roof, it has an L-shaped plan, consisting of a three-bay hall range with two storeys and a hipped roof, and a projecting cross-wing of two storeys and an attic and a roof with a coped gable and kneelers. The windows are chamfered and mullioned, and there is a doorway in the middle bay of the hall range.	II
Cottage northeast of May Royd; 53.73826°N 2.00458°W	—	Mid 17th century	A stone house with quoins, a stone slate roof, and two storeys. The south face has a coped gable with kneelers, and each floor contains four-light mullioned windows, the upper floor with a hood mould, and between the windows are small blocked chamfered lights. On the right return is a lean-to porch.	II
Middle Hathershelf Old Farmhouse; 53.72330°N 1.96332°W		Mid 17th century	The house was later altered and extended. It is in stone with quoins, and has a stone slate roof with coped gable and kneelers. There are two storeys, a double-pile range at the rear, and two bays. The windows are chamfered and mullioned, those in the ground floor with hood moulds. The doorway has an arched dated and initialled lintel.	II
Owlers; 53.73864°N 1.98993°W	—	Mid 17th century	The house was altered in the 18th century. It is in stone with quoins, and has a stone slate roof with coped gables and kneelers. There are two storeys and two bays. The doorway has a chamfered surround, monolithic jambs, and a dated lintel. The windows are chamfered and mullioned.	II
Te Deum Stone; 53.70412°N 2.04726°W		17th century (possible)	The stone stands by a footpath which is an ancient packhorse route. The stone is inscribed with a cross and the opening words of the Te Deum.	II
Wood Top, Hebden Bridge; 53.73395°N 2.00480°W	—	Mid 17th century	In the 19th century, a barn and cottages were added, and later converted into a dwelling. The building is in stone with a stone slate roof and two storeys. The original part has a plinth, a moulded string course, and a coped gable with kneelers and finials. It contains two 18-light mullioned and transomed windows, a cross window, and an inserted doorway with monolithic jambs. At right angles is a single-bay cottage, and at a lower level are cottages and the converted barn. The barn has a semicircular-arched cart entry and the cottages contain mullioned windows.	II
White Lion Public House; 53.74239°N 2.01199°W		1657	The public house was largely rebuilt and extended in the 19th century, the extension curving along the road to the right. It is in stone and has a stone slate roof with coped gables and kneelers. The main block has two storeys and two wide bays. The central doorway has a chamfered surround, composite jambs, and a decorative lintel with a date in a tressure. Above it is a moulded cornice on consoles, and a gabled hood on consoles for the signboard. The windows are mullioned and transomed, with a continuous hood mould over the ground floor windows, and at the rear is a seven-light window.	II
Barn northwest of Stake Farmhouse; 53.72276°N 1.97259°W	—	1658	The barn is in stone and has a stone slate roof with a partly coped gable and kneelers. It has two aisles and five bays. The barn contains cart entries with monolithic lintels, composite jambs, and chamfered surrounds, a doorway with a Tudor arch and a chamfered surround, three rows of arch-headed vents, and a datestone.	II
Higher House; 53.69847°N 2.00244°W	—	1666	A stone house with a slate roof, two storeys and three bays. The windows have chamfered mullions, there is a doorway with a chamfered surround, composite jambs, and a dated Tudor arched lintel, and an inserted doorway with monolithic jambs.	II
Bee-boles west of Higher House; 53.69834°N 2.00268°W	—	c. 1666	The bee boles are set into a wall. They consist of a long row of 16 recesses with monolithic lintels and composite jambs.	II
Lower Hathershelf and Heather Cottage; 53.72350°N 1.96184°W	—	1671	A house, later divided into two, it is in stone and has a stone slate roof with coped gables, kneelers, and finials. There are two storeys, and the house consists of a three-bay hall range, a cross-wing on the left, and gabled wings at the rear with an outshut between them. All the windows have double chamfered mullions. The cross wing contains an eight-light window with a hood mould, and a blocked taking-in door with monolithic jambs. The left bay of the hall range has an 18-light mullioned and transomed window in the ground floor, and a gabled dormer above. In the middle bay is a doorway with a chamfered surround and a Tudor arched head, and the right bay is gabled and contains an eight-light window in each floor.	II
Crumber Hill; 53.71451°N 2.00003°W		Late 17th century	A house with an attached barn; the front of house was rebuilt in about 1840. The buildings are in stone with a stone slate roof. The house has two storeys and two bays. Each bay has a doorway, and the right bay also has a porch with a moulded surround and an ogee lintel. The windows are mullioned. The barn has an arched cart entry over which is a Venetian window, and also contains doorways and mullioned windows.	II
Dean Head; 53.69441°N 1.99809°W	—	Late 17th century (probable)	A house with an attached barn that has been converted for residential use, it is in stone with quoins, and has a stone slate roof, and two storeys. The original house had two bays, and the windows are mullioned; windows with concrete mullions have been inserted into the barn. Between the house and the barn is an inserted gabled porch.	II
Little Stubb; 53.73182°N 1.99506°W	—	Late 17th century	A house, later divided into three, it is in stone with a moulded string course and a stone slate roof. There are two storeys and three bays. All the windows are chamfered with mullions.	II
Lower Cragg; 53.71746°N 1.99446°W	—	Late 17th century	A stone house with quoins and a stone slate roof. There are two storeys, three bays, and a single-storey attached building to the right. The windows are mullioned and the doorway has an inscribed lintel. In the attached building is a doorway with monolithic jambs.	II
Park Farmhouse and barn 53.72947°N 1.99838°W	—	Late 17th century	The barn was added to the left of the farmhouse in the 18th century. The building is in stone, and has a stone slate roof with coped gables and kneelers. The house has two storeys, most of the windows are mullioned, on the front is a later porch, and the doorway has a chamfered surround and a lintel with a depressed Tudor arch. The barn has a semicircular-arched cart entry on the front and the rear, and above the rear entry is a Venetian window.	II
Former White Lion Fisheries and barn 53.74222°N 2.01211°W	—	Late 17th century	A house, later altered and used for other purposes, with a barn added in the 18th century. The buildings are in stone with a stone slate roof, there are two storeys and attics, and the buildings form an L-shaped plan. The gable end of the former house faces the road and has a doorway with a chamfered surround, and a depressed Tudor arched lintel, and most of the windows are mullioned. In the left return a flight of stone steps leads up to a doorway in the upper floor that has monolithic jambs. The barn is to the right of the house and has a semicircular-arched cart entry, and at the rear is a doorway and rectangular vents.	II
Mytholmroyd Bridge; 53.73043°N 1.98243°W		1684	The bridge, which carries New Road over the River Calder, was widened in 1823, the original part surviving to the west. The bridge is in stone, and consists of two segmental arches with a central chamfered pier and a pointed cutwater. Each arch has a span of 42 feet (13 m) and is 9 feet (2.7 m) wide. The bridge has a band, a parapet and keystones, and there are two land arches.	II
Upper Hathershelf; 53.72232°N 1.96814°W	—	1687	The house is in stone with quoins, and a stone slate roof that has gables with kneelers. There are two storeys, a double-depth plan, and three bays. The doorway has monolithic jambs, and a dated lintel, and the window are chamfered with mullions.	II
Park Cottage; 53.72929°N 1.99749°W	—	1695	A stone cottage with a stone slate roof, two storeys, and mullioned windows. The doorway has a chamfered surround and a depressed Tudor arched lintels that is inscribed with the date and initials. On the front is an inserted gabled porch.	II
5 Stubbing Square, Hebden Bridge; 53.74119°N 2.02455°W	—	1705	A stone house that has a tile roof with coped gables, kneelers and finials. There are two storeys and a T-shaped plan, and most of the windows have chamfered mullions. On the wing is a single-storey gabled porch on a plinth that has a doorway with a chamfered surround, and a coped gable with kneelers.	II
Stoney Spring; 53.72938°N 1.95692°W		1706	Two cottages were added to the house in the 19th century. The buildings are in stone with a stone slate roof. The house has two storeys and two bays, and the windows are mullioned. The doorway is in the right return and has a chamfered surround, composite jambs, and an arched lintel. The cottages have three storeys, paired doorways with monolithic jambs, and the windows are sashes.	II
Barn and cottage southeast of Stoney Spring; 53.72925°N 1.95675°W	—	c. 1707	The cottage was inserted into one bay of the barn in the late 18th century. The building is in stone with quoins, a stone slate roof, and has two storeys. The doorways have monolithic jambs, one with large heavy lintel. At the rear is a large semicircular-arched cart entry, the windows are mullioned, and there are arrow-slit vents.	II
Barn west of Foster Clough Farmhouse; 53.74017°N 1.97216°W	—	1707	A stone barn with quoins, and a stone slate roof with coped gables. It contains a square-headed cart entry with quoined jambs and a monolithic lintel, a doorway with monolithic jambs, another doorway with a long quoined dated lintel, and chamfered arrow-slit vents.	II
Hollock Lee Bottom; 53.72535°N 1.99433°W	—	1712	A stone house with quoins and a stone slate roof. There are two storeys, a double-pile plan, and two bays. The windows are chamfered with mullions, there is a doorway with monolithic jambs, and another with a chamfered surround, composite jambs, and a quoined, dated and initialled lintel.	II
Stoney Royd Farmhouse; 53.73610°N 1.96919°W		1715	The house is in stone on a plinth, with quoins, a moulded string course, and a stone slate roof with coped gables and kneelers. There are two storeys and an attic, a double-pile plan, and a symmetrical front of five bays, the middle three bays projecting under a pediment. Three semicircular steps led up to the central doorway that has a moulded surround, composite jambs, and a depressed Tudor arched lintel inscribed with initials and the date. Above the doorway is an oval sundial with initials and the date in the spandrels. All the windows are double chamfered and have mullions. At the rear is a doorway with a chamfered surround, composite jambs, and an arched lintel, and in the upper floor is a taking-in door converted into a window.	II*
Barn northwest of Stoney Royd Farmhouse; 53.73634°N 1.96956°W	—	c. 1715	The barn is in stone, and has a stone slate roof with a coped gable and kneelers on the left. It contains a square-headed cart entry with composite jambs and a monolithic lintel, and a doorway with monolithic jambs and a chamfered lintel.	II
Scout Bottom Farmhouse and barn 53.72768°N 1.97082°W	—	1717	The house was extended in about 1833 and a barn was also added to the right and two cottages at the rear. The buildings are in stone with stone slate roofs. The farmhouse has quoins, two storeys and two bays. The windows are mullioned, and on the front is a gabled porch, and a doorway with a chamfered surround, composite jambs, and a lintel inscribed with initials and dates. The barn has a tall semicircular-arched cart entry converted into a window, and a doorway with monolithic jambs.	II
New House, Mytholmroyd; 53.72684°N 1.98277°W	—	1718	A stone house on a plinth, with rusticated quoins, a raised band, and a stone slate roof with coped gables and kneelers; one gable has a lantern finial. There are two storeys and three bays. On the front is a two-storey porch that has a semicircular-arched doorway with a moulded impost, a dropped keystone, and a ball finial. The inner doorway has a chamfered surround, composite jambs, and a dated lintel. Above the porch is a bull's eye window with a moulded cornice, and the other windows are chamfered with mullions.	II
10 and 12 Blind Lane, Luddendenfoot; 53.72633°N 1.95939°W	—	Early 18th century	A house converted into two cottages, it is in stone with quoins, and has a stone slate roof. There are two storeys, three bays, a rear wing, and a loom shop. The doorways have monolithic jambs, in the upper floor is a semicircular-arched doorway, and in the west front is a corner entrance with semicircular arches and a short Tuscan column. The windows are mixed; some are mullioned, some also have transoms, and some are sashes.	II
Cottage east of 3 Little Hollin Hey; 53.72181°N 1.98350°W	—	Early 18th century	The cottage was raised from one to two storeys in the 19th century. It is in stone with a stone slate roof, and its windows are mullioned. At the rear is a doorway with monolithic jambs, and an inserted cart entry.	II
1, 3, 10 and 12 Sandal Street, Hebden Bridge; 53.74312°N 2.00797°W	—	Early 18th century	A house that was altered in the 19th century and now consists of four cottages. It is in stone with a stone slate roof, two storeys, and a single-bay rear wing. On the front is a west porch with a coped gable and kneelers. There is one mullioned window on the front of the house, one in the porch, and one in the rear wing, and the other windows are sashes. The doorways on the front have monolithic jambs, and in the rear wing is a doorway with composite jambs and a chamfered surround.	II
Bloomer Gate House; 53.73398°N 1.96444°W	—	Early 18th century	Originally three single-bay cottages, the house was refronted in about 1800. It is in stone with quoins, and has a stone slate roof, two storeys, and a double-pile plan. Each cottage had a doorway with monolithic jambs, which is now blocked, and a new doorway has been inserted in the centre. The windows are mullioned, and in the upper floor is a blocked taking-in door.	II
Broad Bottom Farmhouse and barn 53.73567°N 1.98931°W	—	Early 18th century	The farmhouse has an earlier timber framed core, and the barn was added in 1897. The buildings are in stone with stone slate roofs, and the house has two storeys and three bays. The left bay has a coped gable with kneelers, and to the right is a gabled porch that has an entrance with a chamfered surround and an arched lintel. The windows are mullioned. To the right is the barn that has a semicircular-arched cart entry with a chamfered surround, above it is a Venetian window, and it is flanked by doorways. In the right return are arrow-slit vents and a lunette with a keystone.	II
Scar Bottom Cottages; 53.72813°N 1.98568°W		Early 18th century	The cottages are in stone with quoins, and have a stone slate roof with coped gables and moulded kneelers. There are two storeys, and the windows are mullioned with small-pane glazing. There are two doorways, one with a chamfered surround, and the other with monolithic jambs.	II
White Lee Cottages, Mytholmroyd; 53.73171°N 1.97815°W		Early 18th century	A group of stone cottages with quoins and stone slate roofs. There are two storeys, and the cottages form an L-shaped plan. The windows are mullioned, two doorways have monolithic jambs, and there are blocked or altered taking-in doors.	II
Wicken Hill; 53.74151°N 1.98172°W	—	Early 18th century	The house has been joined to a later 18th-century barn by an inserted re-used 17th-century porch. The building is in stone with quoins, and a tile roof. The main range has two storeys and three bays, and a wing with one storey and an attic. The windows are mullioned, the doorway has monolithic jambs and a heavy lintel, and the inserted porch is gabled and has a doorway with a chamfered surround. The former barn is at right angles and contains a semicircular-arched cart entry, above which is a Venetian window.	II
Hawks Clough Farmhouse; 53.73322°N 1.99145°W	—	1731	A stone house that has a stone slate roof with a coped gable, kneelers and finial on the right. There are two storeys, three bays, and a later two-storey two-bay rear wing. On the front is a later outshut within which is a doorway with a moulded surround and a Tudor arched dated lintel. At the rear is a doorway with a segmental-arched head, a moulded surround and a keystone, and above it is a circular window. The other windows in the main part of the house are mullioned. The rear wing has a plinth, rusticated quoins, an eaves band, and gutter brackets, and it contains sash windows.	II
Slater Bank; 53.74590°N 2.01532°W	—	c. 1740	A range was added to the rear in the 19th century, and the house has been divided into three. It is in stone with quoins, and a stone slate roof with coped gables and kneelers. There are two storeys on the west front, three on the east front, and an attic. On the west front the windows are mullioned, and there is a doorway with monolithic jambs and a fanlight. In the left return is a blocked taking-in door, and the windows on the east front are sashes.	II
Lower Hathershelf; 53.72341°N 1.96152°W		1743	A pair of cottages with another cottage at the rear, they are in stone with quoins and stone slate roofs. They have two storeys, and the cottages at the front have one bay each. The doorways have monolithic jambs, and the windows in the rear cottage are mullioned.	II
60 and 62 Bridge Lanes, Hebden Bridge; 53.74134°N 2.01845°W	—	Mid 18th century	A pair of cottages that were altered in the 19th century. They are in stone, and have quoins, square gutter brackets, three storeys, and one bay each. The doorways are paired in the centre, and the windows are mullioned.	II
2–10 Hob Lane, Luddendenfoot; 53.72677°N 1.96286°W	—	Mid 18th century	A row of cottages later combined into one dwelling. It is in stone with quoins, and a stone slate roof. There are two storeys and five bays, and the windows are mullioned. In the first two bays are doorways with monolithic jambs, and the windows in the other bays have arched lights, sunken spandrels, and hood moulds.	II
Guide post at SE 000272; 53.74165°N 2.00077°W		18th century (probable)	The guide post stands at a road junction. It is an upright stone in gritstone, and has four faces, one of which is inscribed with "HEBDEN BRIDGE".	II
Guide post at SE 015270; 53.73975°N 1.97754°W		18th century (probable)	The guide post is on the north side of Height Road. It is an upright stone with four sides, two are engraved with pointing hands, one of which also has "MIDGELEY", and the other "HEBDEN BRIDGE".	II
Guide post at SE 026264; 53.73402°N 1.96069°W		18th century (probable)	The guide post stands at a road junction. It is an upright stone with four sides, two are engraved with pointing hands, the north face also has "HOWARTH", and the south face "MYTHOLMROYD".	II
Hirst Bridge; 53.74556°N 2.00370°W		Mid 18th century (probable)	A former packhorse bridge crossing Ibbot Royd Clough, it is in stone and consists of a single segmental arch. The bridge has a parapet capped by large flagstones.	II
Kirby Cote; 53.70684°N 1.98988°W		Mid 18th century	A stone house with a quoined angle on the left, and a stone slate roof with a coped gable with kneelers on the left. There are two storeys, a double-pile plan, and two bays. On the front is a gabled porch with cappings and kneelers, and most of the windows are mullioned.	II
Barn south of Little Hollin Hey; 53.72149°N 1.98379°W	—	Mid 18th century	A stone barn with a stone slate roof. It contains segmental-ached cart entries, doorways with monolithic jambs, a square pitching hole, and vents of various types.	II
Manor House, cottage and barn, Hebden Bridge; 53.74222°N 1.99952°W		Mid 18th century	The cottage and barn were added to the house in 1814. The buildings are in stone with quoins, and a stone slate roof with coped gables and kneelers. There are two storeys, the house has two bays, and the cottage to the left has one bay. The house and cottage each has a doorway with monolithic jambs, flanking the doorway of the house are bay windows with a tile roof, and the other windows are mullioned. The barn, further to the left, contains a semicircular-arched cart entry with a Venetian window above, and a doorway to the left.	II
Swillington and barn 53.70715°N 1.98517°W	—	Mid 18th century	The barn was added to the house in 1848. The buildings are in stone with a stone slate roof. The house has quoins, two storeys, three bays, and a rear outshut. The doorway has monolithic jambs, and the windows are mullioned. The barn to the left has an arched cart entry with a dated keystone, a Venetian window above, and doorways at the sides.	II
Upper Needless; 53.74221°N 1.99570°W	—	Mid 18th century	Originally a Baptist meetinghouse and school, later a private house, it is in stone with quoins and a stone slate roof. There are three storeys, a wide gabled porch over which is an inscribed plaque, and mullioned windows. At the rear is a two-storey building with paired doorways, over which is a dated plaque.	II
Wood End House; 53.74681°N 2.01023°W	—	1760	The house was altered and extended in the 19th century, and further extended to the rear in the 20th century. It is in stone with quoins and a stone slate roof. There are two storeys, four bays and a rear extension. The windows are mullioned, and at the rear is an outshut with a barrel vaulted cellar.	II
Summer house east of 3 Ewood Court; 53.73429°N 1.96650°W	—	1762	The summer house is in stone with quoins, a moulded eaves cornice, and a hipped stone slate roof. It has a square plan, and it contains a semicircular-arched doorway with a moulded impost and a keystone inscribed with the date and initials.	II
Kimbo Cottage; 53.73241°N 1.97810°W		1762	A stone house with raised quoins, a band, and a stone slate roof with coped gables and kneelers. There are two storeys and four bays. The doorway has monolithic jambs, the windows are mullioned, and above the doorway is a date plaque.	II
Mytholm Cottage; 53.74289°N 2.02510°W	—	1763	A stone house on a plinth, with quoins, a band, and a stone slate roof. There are two storeys, a symmetrical front of three bays, and an attached single-storey gabled building at the rear. In the centre of the front is a doorway with monolithic jambs that has been converted to a French window, and the other windows are mullioned. Above the doorway is a date plaque, and in the left return is a blocked taking-in door.	II
West End Bridge, Hebden Bridge; 53.74130°N 2.01466°W	—	1771–72	The bridge carries the A646 road over Hebden Water. It originated as a turnpike road, and in the mid-19th century another bridge was added to the northeast. The bridge is in stone and consists of two segmental arches. The older part has decorative voussoirs over a bull-nosed cutwater. The later part has central buttresses, a pointed cutwater, a band and a parapet with chamfered cappings.	II
Barn west of 1 Park Fold; 53.72853°N 1.99932°W	—	Late 18th century (probable)	The barn is in stone and has a stone slate roof. There is a single aisle, it contains arched cart entries flanked by doorways, and in the gable apex is an owl hole.	II
Cottage south of 1 Park Fold; 53.72846°N 1.99910°W	—	Late 18th century	The cottage is in stone with quoins, a stone slate roof, and two storeys. External steps lead up to a doorway in the west gable end that has monolithic jambs, and in each floor is a five-light mullioned window. The other faces also contain mullioned windows.	II
Brearley Bridge; 53.72982°N 1.96112°W		Late 18th century	The bridge carries Brearley Lane over the River Calder. It is in stone, and consists of two segmental arches of different sizes. The bridge has parapets and buttressed ends.	II
Briar Hey, Mytholmroyd; 53.73096°N 1.97309°W	—	Late 18th century	This consists of a pair of two-storey cottages and a three-storey former warehouse at right angles, forming an L-shaped plan. The buildings are in stone with stone slate roofs. The cottages have three bays, mullioned windows, and doorways with monolithic jambs. In the upper floor is a blocked taking-in window, and in the right corner is a segmental-arched passageway. The former warehouse has three bays, some of the windows are mullioned, and others have been replaced.	II
Bridge over the River Calder, Hebble End; 53.74086°N 2.01778°W	—	Late 18th century	The bridge carries Hebble End over the River Calder, and was widened in 1806. It is in stone, and consists of a single segmental arch. The bridge has rusticated voussoirs, a band, and a parapet with chamfered capping, and at the ends are circular domed piers.	II
Bridge No. 8, Brearley Bridge; 53.73080°N 1.96155°W		Late 18th century	The bridge carries Brearley Lane over the Rochdale Canal. It is in stone and consists of a single horseshoe elliptical arch. The bridge has a band, a parapet, and buttressed piers at the ends.	II
Bridge No. 15, Mayroyd Bridge; 53.73736°N 2.00462°W		Late 18th century	The bridge over the Rochdale Canal is in stone and consists of a single horseshoe elliptical arch. The bridge has a band, a parapet, and end piers with capping.	II
Foster Mill Bridge; 53.74684°N 2.01409°W		Late 18th century (probable)	A former packhorse bridge over Hebden Water, it is in stone, and consists of a single segmental arch. The parapet rises to a point in the centre.	II
Guide post at SE 006271; 53.74137°N 1.99215°W		Late 18th century (probable)	The guide post stands at a road junction. It is an upright stone with four sides, two are engraved with pointing hands, and one of these sides with "BRIDGE" and the other with "WELL".	II
Hawks Clough Bridge; 53.73356°N 1.99110°W		Late 18th century (probable)	The bridge carries a track over the River Calder. It is in stone and consists of a single segmental arch. The bridge has retaining walls, voussoirs, a parapet with cappings, and piers on the south side.	II
High Rough; 53.74159°N 1.97537°W	—	Late 18th century	The house, to which a barn was added in the 19th century, is in stone with a stone slate roof that has coped gables and kneelers, and the barn has an asbestos roof. The house has quoins, two storeys and two bays. The doorway has monolithic jambs, and the windows are mullioned. The barn contains a cart entry with a segmental head, impost blocks, and a keystone.	II
Hoo Hole Bridge; 53.72509°N 1.98891°W		Late 18th century (probable)	The bridge carries a road over Cragg Brook. It is in stone and consists of a single segmental arch with a parapet.	II
Huntsman Cottage; 53.73238°N 1.97829°W		Late 18th century	A stone house with quoins and a stone slate roof. There are two storeys and two bays. The doorway has monolithic jambs and a heavy lintel, there is a blocked doorway to the right, and the windows are mullioned.	II
Low Bank Farmhouse, Cottage and Barn; 53.72451°N 1.98076°W	—	Late 18th century	A two-cottage laithe house, later combined into one dwelling, it is in stone with quoins and a stone slate roof. There are two storeys and four bays. The windows are mullioned, and the doorways have monolithic jambs. In the barn is a cart entry with a monolithic lintel, mullioned windows, and doorways.	II
Middle Hathershelf; 53.72337°N 1.96307°W		Late 18th century (probable)	A barn that was extended and converted into cottages in the 19th century, it is in stone with quoins, and has a stone slate roof. There are two storeys, and in the left part is a segmental-arched cart entry, converted into a doorway, which has impost blocks, and a keystone carved with a head. To the right is a doorway with monolithic jambs, and the windows are mullioned. At the rear, the cart entry has a monolithic lintel, and above it is a Venetian window.	II
Milestone at SE 001265; 53.73569°N 1.99968°W		Late 18th century (probable)	The milestone is to the north of Burnley Road (A646 road) near Hebden Bridge. It consists of a thin stone flag with an arched head. The flagstone is inscribed with pointing hands and the distances to Todmorden and Halifax.	II
Milestone at SE 016260; 53.73042°N 1.97761°W		Late 18th century	The milestone is on the north side of Burnley Road (A646 road) at Mytholmroyd, and consists of a stone with an arched head. The stone is inscribed with pointing hands and the distances to Todmorden and Halifax.	II
Milestone at SE 030257; 53.72843°N 1.95480°W		Late 18th century	The milestone is on the northeast side of Burnley Road (A646 road) near Mytholmroyd, and consists of a stone with an arched head. The stone is inscribed with pointing hands and the distances to Todmorden and Halifax.	II
Milking Bridge; 53.74708°N 2.02912°W		Late 18th century	A footbridge over Colden Water, it is in stone, and consists of a single segmental arch. The bridge has voussoirs, and a low parapet with iron railings.	II
Mount Pleasant Mills (part); 53.73209°N 1.97947°W		Late 18th century (probable)	The mill, later used for other purposes, is in stone with a slate roof, three storeys and attics, and nine bays. The windows have plain surrounds and slightly projecting sills, and most have small panes. In the seventh bay is a taking-in door in each floor with monolithic jambs, and over the sixth, seventh and eighth bays is a gable. In the gable end facing the road is a Venetian window.	II
Robin Hood Cottages; 53.71079°N 1.99162°W	—	Late 18th century	A row of three stone cottages with stone slate roofs. There are two storeys and each cottage has one bay. On the west front, each cottage has a doorway with monolithic jambs, and on the east front are mullioned windows.	II
Stephenson House and barn 53.73842°N 1.98761°W	—	Late 18th century	The barn was added in the 19th century. The building is in stone with quoins and a stone slate roof. The house has two storeys and three bays, and the windows are mullioned. The barn has an arched cart entry, with a Venetian window above, and a doorway with a chamfered surround. In the right gable end are rectangular vents.	II
The Dusty Miller Public House and barn 53.73087°N 1.98274°W		Late 18th century (probable)	The public house and attached barn are in stone with quoins and a stone slate roof. The public house has two storeys and a symmetrical front of three bays. The central doorway has monolithic jambs, and above it is a semicircular-arched window with a moulded impost and a keystone. The outer bays contain Venetian windows with imposts and keystones, and with the middle lights sashed. The barn to the left contains a cart entry and doorways, all converted into windows, and elsewhere are sash windows and mullioned windows.	II
The Square, Mytholmroyd; 53.73390°N 1.99070°W		Late 18th century	A row of cottages backing on to the Rochdale Canal, they are in stone with quoins and a stone slate roof. There are two storeys and five bays. Each cottage has a doorway and mullioned windows, although some mullions have been lost.	II
White Lee and barn 53.73191°N 1.97841°W	—	Late 18th century	A laithe house in stone with quoins and a stone slate roof. The house has two storeys, a double-pile plan, one bay, a doorway, and mullioned windows. In the barn is a semicircular-arched cart entry with an impost block and a keystone. Above it is a Venetian window, and to the right is a doorway with monolithic jambs. In the wide gable end are double doorways, and in the apex is a dovecote.	II
Former Baptist Chapel; 53.74156°N 2.01543°W		1777	The chapel has been converted into an arts centre. It is in stone with quoins, a band, an eaves cornice, and a stone slate roof. There are two storeys and a symmetrical front of five bays. The central bay contains a pair of windows with semicircular heads, a moulded impost, and a triple keystone, and above is a square inscribed sundial. The flanking bays each contains a doorway with an architrave, a pulvinated frieze, and a triangular pediment with a modillioned surround. Above, and in the outer bays, are sash windows, and to the left is a three-storey extension with sash windows and a shop window.	II
Keelham and barn 53.71627°N 2.00557°W	—	1781	The barn was added to the house in the 19th century, and they are both in stone. The house has quoins, two storeys, two bays, and a single-storey outshut. On the front is a gabled porch, and the windows are mullioned. The barn has a cart entry flanked by doorways, and a small arched window above.	II
Broad Fold; 53.69288°N 1.99413°W	—	1784	The barn was added to the house in the 19th century. It is in stone, with a stone slate roof, two storeys, a double-pile plan, and two bays. The windows have five lights and mullions, the doorway has monolithic jambs, and above it is an inscribed datestone. The barn has segmental-arched cart entries and doorways with monolithic jambs.	II
Black Pit Aqueduct; 53.74027°N 2.01511°W	—	1797	The aqueduct carries the Rochdale Canal over the River Calder. It is in stone, and consists of four segmental arches. The aqueduct has bull-nosed cutwaters, keystones, one of which is dated, a band, and a parapet with large cappings.	II
Lock No. 5, Edward Kilner Lock; 53.72834°N 1.95604°W		1798	The lock has stone retaining walls with rebates for gates. It is fitted with the facility for a double-set of bottom gates.	II
Lock No. 6, Brearley Upper Lock; 53.73018°N 1.95968°W		1798	The lock has stone retaining walls with rebates for gates. It is fitted with the facility for a double-set of bottom gates.	II
Lock No. 7, Broadbottom lock and overflow channel 53.73417°N 1.99148°W		1798	The lock and the overflow channel have stone retaining walls, and the lock has rebates for gates.	II
Lock No. 8, May Royd Lock; 53.73811°N 2.00665°W		1798	The lock has stone retaining walls with rebates for gates. It is fitted with the facility for a double-set of bottom gates.	II
Lock No. 9 and footbridge 53.74025°N 2.01459°W		1798	The lock has stone retaining walls with rebates for gates. It is fitted with the facility for a double-set of bottom gates. At the east end is an integral stone footbridge consisting of a single segmental arch.	II
Lock No. 10, Stubbing Lower Lock; 53.74079°N 2.02194°W		1798	The lock has stone retaining walls with rebates for gates. It is fitted with the facility for a double-set of bottom gates. Stone stairs lead down from the northern end.	II
Lock No. 11, Stubbing Upper Lock; 53.74092°N 2.02361°W		1798	The lock has stone retaining walls with rebates for gates. It is fitted with the facility for a double-set of bottom gates.	II
Overflow channel and culvert 53.72602°N 1.95154°W	—	c. 1798	The overflow channel is on the north side of the Rochdale Canal, it curves and runs into a culvert running under the canal and into the River Calder. The structures are in stone, and the entrance and the exit from the culvert have segmental arches, the latter with large voussoirs.	II
4 and 6 Church Street, Mytholmroyd; 53.73003°N 1.98202°W	—	c. 1800	Four combined houses with a workroom above, in stone with a slate roof that has coped gables. There are three storeys, and the windows are casements with plain surrounds. In the ground floor to the right is a doorway with a rusticated surround and a fanlight, and to the left are double doors with plain surrounds.	II
Bridge over the River Calder, Stubbing Holme; 53.74122°N 2.01957°W	—	c. 1800	The bridge carries Stubbing Holme Road over the River Calder. It is in stone and consists of two stilted arches. The bridge has rough dressed parapets and voussoirs.	II
Bridge No. 12, Redacre Bridge; 53.73246°N 1.98408°W		c. 1800	The bridge carries Westfield Terrace over the Rochdale Canal. It is in stone, and consists of a single horseshoe elliptical arch. The bridge has voussoirs, a parapet with capping, and buttressed end piers.	II
Bridge No. 13, Broadbottom Bridge; 53.73388°N 1.98959°W		c. 1800	The bridge carries High Lock Court over the Rochdale Canal. It is in stone, and consists of a single horseshoe elliptical arch. The bridge has a band and a larger dressed stone parapet.	II
Bridge No. 19, Stubbings Bridge; 53.74087°N 2.02570°W		c. 1800	The bridge carries Stubbing Brink over the Rochdale Canal. It is in stone, and consists of a single horseshoe elliptical arch. The bridge has rusticated voussoirs, a band and a parapet with large cappings.	II
Canal overflow ford 53.72607°N 1.95202°W	—	c. 1800	The ford provides an overflow facility for excess water to flow from the Rochdale Canal into the River Calder. On the edge of the canal are timber baulks leading to a ford 2 metres (6 ft 7 in) wide lined with stone setts.	II
Foster Clough House; 53.74060°N 1.97350°W	—	c. 1800	A pair of cottages later combined into one house, it is in stone and has a stone slate roof. There are two storeys, two bays, and a later single-storey single-bay extension to the left. On the front are two doorways with monolithic jambs, and the windows are mullioned.	II
Little Park Farmhouse; 53.72930°N 1.99779°W		c. 1800	A pair of cottages, later combined into one, they are in stone with quoins, and have a stone slate roof with a coped gable on the left. There are two storeys and two bays. The doorway has monolithic jambs, and the windows are mullioned.	II
Lock-keeper's house 53.74103°N 2.02361°W	—	c. 1800	The lock-keeper's house is adjacent to Lock No. 11 on the Rochdale Canal. It is in stone with quoins and a stone slate roof. There are two storeys and three bays. Above the central doorway is a small window, and the other windows are corner-windows.	II
Sunny Bank, Mytholmroyd; 53.73244°N 1.97901°W		c. 1800	A group of dwellings in stone with a stone slate roof, a front of five bays, and containing mullioned windows. At the front are three dwellings with four storeys, and at the rear are five over-dwellings with two storeys.	II
Barn south of 2 Broad Bottom; 53.73561°N 1.98967°W	—	Late 18th or early 19th century	The barn is in stone with quoins and an asbestos roof. It contains segmental-arched cart entries and doorways.	II
Stocks Hall Cottage; 53.72875°N 1.98795°W	—	Late 18th or early 19th century (probable)	Originally servants' quarters to the hall, the cottage is in stone with a stone slate roof. There are two storeys and three bays. The doorway has monolithic jambs, and the windows are mullioned.	II
2–16 Machpelah, Hebden Bridge; 53.73995°N 2.00924°W		c. 1810	A terrace of houses in stone with stone slate roof. Nos. 12–16 were built first, followed by the others by about 1825. Nos. 10–16 have three storeys and Nos. 2–8 have two. Between Nos. 8 and 10 is a passage with angle quoins leading to the rear yard. The windows on the front are sashes. In the left gable apex are two tiers of mullioned workshop windows and cantilevered stone steps leading to an upper doorway, and there are similar windows at the rear.	II
1, 5, 7 and 9 Machpelah Yard, Hebden Bridge; 53.74011°N 2.00930°W	—	c. 1810	A tenement block in stone, with a stone slate roof, three storeys and attics. In the lower two floors is a cottage with sash windows. A flight of dog-leg cantilevered stairs lead to the upper dwellings, which have galleries on three sides and mullioned windows. In the attic of No. 5 is a Venetian window.	II
Sunderland House and New Sunderland; 53.72742°N 1.96093°W		1811	The house is in stone with a projecting eaves cornice, and three hipped slate roofs. There are two storeys, the main block has a symmetrical front of three bays, and it is flanked on each side by a projecting two-storey wing. In the centre is a porch with Corinthian columns, and a semicircular-arched doorway with a fanlight. The wings have mullioned windows, and in the right wing is a taking-in door.	II
Mid Birks; 53.71278°N 1.98948°W		1812	A row of three stone cottages with quoins and a stone slate roof. There are two storeys and three bays. One window has been replaced, and the others are stepped mullioned windows.	II
Southcliffe House, wall, gate piers, and railings 53.74047°N 2.00989°W	—	1813	A house and office in stone with quoins, an eaves band, moulded gutter brackets, and a stone slate roof. There are two storeys and an attic, and four bays. The doorway has monolithic jambs and a fanlight, and the windows are sashes. At the rear is a semicircular-arched stair window with a keystone. In the right return are two doorways, and a Venetian window in the attic with a dated lintel. In front of the house is a retaining wall containing gate piers and a corner post, all with hipped capping. The gates and the railings on the wall are in cast iron.	II
Crow Nest Bridge; 53.73794°N 2.00784°W		1818	The bridge carries Mayroyd Lane over the River Calder. It is in stone and consists of two segmental arches. The bridge has bull-nosed cutwaters, a parapet with angled cappings, and a dated keystone.	II
51–69 Bridge Lanes, Hebden Bridge; 53.74150°N 2.01990°W	—	Early 19th century	A row of stone cottages with stone slate roofs, they have two storeys at the front and five or six at the rear, and each cottage has one bay. Facing the road each cottage has a doorway with monolithic jambs, and most have sash windows; one has been replaced by a shop window. At the rear the windows are mullioned.	II
71–95 Bridge Lanes, Hebden Bridge; 53.74172°N 2.02073°W	—	Early 19th century	A row of single-bay cottages, stepped up a hill, in stone, with quoins, and stone slate roofs. They have two storeys at the front, and three or four storeys at the rear. The windows are mullioned, some containing sashes. No. 89–95 have been refashioned, with a gabled attic above the middle two cottages, and No. 95 has a shop window.	II
74 Bridge Lanes, Hebden Bridge; 53.74152°N 2.01920°W	—	Early 19th century	A stone cottage with quoins and a stone slate roof. There are two storeys, a double-depth plan, and one bay. The doorway is to the left, the windows are mullioned, and there is another doorway in the left return.	II
3, 5, 7 and 9 Foster Lane, Hebden Bridge; 53.74521°N 2.01062°W	—	Early 19th century	A row of four cottages, in stone with stone slate roofs. No. 3 has three storeys, the others have two, and each cottage has one bay. The doorways have monolithic jambs, and most of the windows are mullioned.	II
14–24 Foster Lane, Hebden Bridge; 53.74511°N 2.01011°W		Early 19th century	A row of six stone cottages with moulded stone gutters and a stone slate roof. There are two storeys, and each cottage has one bay. Some windows are mullioned, some have been replaced, and in the right gable apex is a Venetian window.	II
28–40 Foster Lane, Hebden Bridge; 53.74535°N 2.01046°W	—	Early 19th century	A row of seven stone cottages with quoins and a stone slate roof. There are two storeys, and each cottage has one bay. Most of the windows are mullioned.	II
3 Machpelah Yard, Hebden Bridge; 53.74005°N 2.00918°W	—	Early 19th century	A former workshop in stone, with quoins and a stone slate roof. There are two storeys and four bays. In the ground floor are two doorways, and a trough built into the wall. On the left return external stone steps lead to a doorway in the upper floor. The windows are sashes.	II
1–11 New Road, Hebden Bridge; 53.74010°N 2.01000°W	—	Early 19th century	A row of cottages in stone, with quoins and a stone slate roof. There are two storeys at the front, three at the rear, and six bays. Most of the doorways have retained their fanlights, the windows on the front are sashes, and at the rear they are mullioned.	II
8 to 12 Nutclough, outbuilding and steps 53.74463°N 2.00900°W		Early 19th century	A row of four cottages, at various times used for weaving and as an inn, they are in stone with quoins and a stone slate roof. There are two storeys and four bays, and the windows are mullioned. At the left end is an outshut, and beyond that is a flight of steps leading to an upper floor doorway.	II
15 Old Gate, Hebden Bridge; 53.74177°N 2.01418°W	—	Early 19th century	A stone house with quoins and a stone slate roof. There are three storeys and one bay. The windows are mullioned, with four lights in the ground floor and five lights in the upper floors.	II
2–12 St George's Square, Hebden Bridge; 53.74201°N 2.01251°W	—	Early 19th century	A row of six stone shops with quoins and a stone slate roof. There are two storeys and six bays. In the ground floor, each shop has a doorway and a shop window, and the upper floor contains mullioned windows.	II
Bank House and New Delight, Mytholmroyd; 53.72639°N 1.98299°W	—	Early 19th century	A row of four cottages, later combined into two houses, they are in stone with stone slate roofs. The cottages have two storeys and one bay each, they are stepped up a hill, and each has a different roof line. Each cottage has a doorway and mullioned windows, with three lights in the ground floor and five lights above.	II
Bethesda Row, 2–12 Burnley Road; 53.73366°N 1.99039°W		Early 19th century (probable)	A row of stone cottages with quoins and a stone slate roof. There are two storeys, and every cottage has one bay. Each cottage has a doorway and mullioned windows, with five lights in the ground floor and six lights in the upper floor.	II
Bottoms, Cragg, Vale; 53.70991°N 1.99270°W		Early 19th century	A row of six stone cottages with quoins and a stone slate roof. There are two storeys, and every cottage has one bay. Each cottage has a doorway, and mullioned windows with five lights in both floors.	II
Boundary stones at SD 996213; 53.68824°N 2.00608°W		Early 19th century (probable)	There are three upright rectangular stones at the points of a triangle 30 metres (98 ft) apart from each other. Each stone is orientated differently and is inscribed "S+B"".	II
Bridge No. 7, Stoney Spring Bridge; 53.72824°N 1.95583°W		Early 19th century	An accommodation bridge over the Rochdale Canal, it is in stone, it consists of a single segmental arch, and has a renewed parapet.	II
Burlees Cottages; 53.74014°N 1.99692°W	—	Early 19th century	A row of three cottages in stone with quoins, an eaves band, and stone slate roofs with coped gables and kneelers. Nos. 4 and 6 have two storeys, No. 2, which was added later, is recessed and has three storeys at the front and two at the rear, and all the cottages have one bay. Each cottage has a doorway with monolithic jambs and mullioned windows; No. 2 also has an arched window in the top floor.	II
Castle Gate Works; 53.70950°N 1.99372°W	—	Early 19th century	A former factory, it is in stone with quoins and a stone slate roof. There are two storeys and an attic, and a front of five bays, with a gable above the middle bay. In the middle bay is an arched cart entry with rusticated voussoirs, and above are taking-in doors. The right bay contains a doorway, and in the returns are two bays.	II
Catherine House Farmhouse and barn 53.70066°N 1.98679°W		Early 19th century	A row of three stone cottages and an attached barn. The cottages have two storeys, one bay each, windows that were originally mullioned, and doorways. Attached to the left is a barn that is taller and wider, and has a rear aisle. It contains a semicircular-headed cart entry with an impost and a keystone, and above it is a Venetian window with a decorated lintel and keystones. To the right is a doorway with monolithic jambs, and a blocked mullioned window, and there are three arrow-slit vents. In the left return are three doorways and two taking-in doors.	II
Detached chimney, Catherine House Farm; 53.70054°N 1.98668°W		Early 19th century	The chimney is in stone, it is circular, and stands on a square base.	II
Foster Clough; 53.74030°N 1.97378°W	—	Early 19th century	A row of six stone cottages with quoins, an eaves band, gutter brackets, and a stone slate roof with coped gables and kneelers. There are two storeys, and each cottage has one bay, a doorway with monolithic jambs, and mullioned windows. Some also have modern flat-roofed dormers.	II
Green Springs; 53.74053°N 2.02956°W	—	Early 19th century	A pair of stone cottages with quoins, a tile roof, two storeys and two bays. Each cottage has a doorway with monolithic jambs, and a five-light mullioned window in each floor. In front of the house is a stone trough with a stone slab.	II
Grove House, Grove Cottage, and Oakroyd; 53.73087°N 1.95871°W	—	Early 19th century	Three houses: Grove House is back to back with Oldroyd, and is joined by an arch on the right to Grove Cottage. They are in stone with a stone slate roof and three storeys. Grove House has a symmetrical front of three bays, and has rusticated quoins, a doorway with monolithic jambs, and a moulded cornice. To the right is a semicircular-headed cart entry with inscribed voussoirs. Grove Cottage, further to the right, has two bays, a doorway with a projecting hood on consoles, and a window with a cornice. The windows in both parts are sashes.	II
Guide post at the junction with Heptonstall Road; 53.74441°N 2.01640°W		Early 19th century	The guide post is an upright stone and is inscribed on two faces with pointing hands and on the east face is "LEE " TO WOOD RD. HEPTONSTALL" and on the west face "TO SLACK COLDEN AND BLACKSHAWHEAD".	II
Marsh Grove, Cragg Vale; 53.70501°N 2.00272°W	—	Early 19th century	A stone house with rusticated quoins and a slate roof. There are two storeys, a double-pile plan, and a symmetrical front of three bays. The doorway has monolithic jambs and a fanlight, and the windows on the front are sashes. At the rear, the outer bays contain mullioned windows, and in the middle bay are paired doorways, one blocked, and a blocked taking-in door above.	II
Mayroyd Mill Wheelhouse, Weir and Culvert; 53.73834°N 2.00819°W	—	Early 19th century	The wheelhouse of a demolished watermill is in stone with a stone slate roof. At the rear is a large semicircular-arched entrance to the sluice, and inside there is a cast iron and steel undershot waterwheel 16 feet (4.9 m) in diameter and 15 feet (4.6 m) wide. The weir is set diagonally across the river and is buttressed. The culvert, which is in stone, is arched, and stretches for 440 metres (1,440 ft).	II
Milestone at SD 988202; 53.68011°N 2.01690°W		Early 19th century (probable)	The milestone is on the southeast side of Blackstone Edge Road (B6138 road). It has a triangular plan and an arched head, and is overlaid in cast iron. On the top is "MYTHOLMROYD & BLACKSTONE EDGE ROAD SOWERBY" and on the lower faces are the distances to Rochdale, Mytholm Royd, and Halifax.	II
New Bridge, Cragg Vale; 53.70807°N 1.99767°W		Early 19th century	The bridge carries a road over Cragg Brook, it is in stone, and consists of a single segmental arch. The bridge has voussoirs, and a parapet with large rough dressed cappings.	II
Nutclough; 53.74480°N 2.00915°W	—	Early 19th century	A row of three cottages in stone with a stone slate roof. Each cottage has one bay. Nos. 18 and 20 have two storeys above coal houses, and are approached by flights of steps, and No. 16 has three storeys. The windows are mullioned, and in the right return is the doorway to No. 14 in the middle floor.	II
Nutclough Mill; 53.74427°N 2.01008°W		Early 19th century	Originally a fustian mill, it is in stone with bands and a slate roof. There are five storeys, a double-pile plan, 20 bays on the front, four on the sides, and 24 at the rear. At the north end is a tower rising three storeys above the body of the mill. The tower has six stages, towards the top are two floors of semicircular-arched windows with keystones and a linking impost band. Above this is a cornice on consoles, and a water tank with a pyramidal roof.	II
Peter Row, Cragg Vale; 53.71032°N 1.99225°W	—	Early 19th century	A row of five stone cottages with quoins and a stone slate roof. There are two storeys, and each cottage has one bay. a doorway, and a mullioned window in each floor.	II
Spa Terrace, Cragg Vale; 53.71443°N 1.98941°W		Early 19th century	A row of back to back cottages in stone with quoins, a stone slate roof, and three bays. The two left bays have three storeys, and the windows are mullioned with three lights, the middle light taller. The right bay has two storeys, a doorway with monolithic jambs, and sash windows.	II
Stocks Hall; 53.72878°N 1.98777°W	—	Early 19th century	A stone house with quoins, a band, gutter brackets, and a stone slate roof with coped gables. There are two storeys and an attic, and five bays. The doorway has monolithic jambs and a cornice on consoles, and above it is a Venetian window with a keystone. The other windows are sashes, and at the rear is a doorway with an architrave, a pulvinated frieze, and a pediment. There is another Venetian window in the attic of the right return.	II
Stoney Royd; 53.71253°N 2.01020°W		Early 19th century	A laithe house in stone with a stone slate roof. The house has two storeys and two bays, and contains mullioned windows. The barn to the left has a large semicircular-arched cart entry, a small Venetian window above, and doorways to the sides.	II
Barn west of Sunderland House Farmhouse; 53.72658°N 1.96005°W	—	Early 19th century	A stone barn with a slate roof that has coped gables with kneelers. It contains an arched cart entry with raised rusticated voussoirs, above which is a mullioned window with a hood mould. The doorways have ogee lintels, and the vents are circular with four raised keystones, those in the gable apices with quatrefoils.	II
Sunny Bank and Sunny Bank Cottage; 53.70911°N 1.99813°W		Early 19th century	Three cottages, later converted into two dwellings, they are in stone with stone slate roofs. There are three storeys and three bays, and in each bay is a doorway with monolithic jambs, one of which is blocked, and mullioned windows. On the front is a later porch with a semicircular-arched lintel, and on the right return is a datestone.	II
Swan Bank Farmhouse, cottages and barn 53.70755°N 2.00813°W	—	Early 19th century	The buildings are in stone with a stone slate roof, hipped at the north end, and they form a U-shaped plan. The barn has a segmental-arched cart entry with an impost and a keystone, a Venetian window above, and doorways at the sides. In the gable end is a blocked lunette, and a circular hole that contains a re-used stone with a carved face. Attached at right angles is a pair of cottages with two storeys, one bay each, and mullioned windows. At the other end is a projecting wing.	II
Cart shed, Swan Bank Farm; 53.70744°N 2.00851°W		Early 19th century (probable)	The cart shed is in stone and has a stone slate roof. In its broad gable end are two semicircular-headed cart entries.	II
The Grove Inn; 53.73083°N 1.95848°W		Early 19th century	The public house is in stone, with a stone slate roof, three storeys, and a symmetrical front of five bays. The central doorway has Doric pilasters, an entablature, and a cornice, and the windows are sashes.	II
The Neptune; 53.74067°N 2.01770°W	—	Early 19th century	A public house, later two private houses, the building is in stone with quoins, a stone slate roof, and two storeys. Each house has a doorway with monolithic jambs, and a lintel with a cornice. The windows are sashes, and on the front is a blocked taking-in door. The right return contains a two-storey semicircular-arched recess containing a taking-in door converted into a doorway and a window.	II
Upper Blind Lane Farmhouse and barn 53.72551°N 1.95908°W	—	Early 19th century	The barn was added later to the farmhouse; both are in stone with a stone slate roof. The house has two storeys and two bays, and the barn has a single bay. On the front of the house is a gabled porch, the house and barn both have doorways with monolithic jambs and chamfered surrounds, and the windows are mullioned. In the barn is a segmental-arched cart entry with a square pitching hole above.	II
Cottages to rear of Wadsworth Royd Farmhouse; 53.73719°N 1.98128°W	—	Early 19th century	A pair of stone cottages that have stone slate roofs, and gables with quoined angles, kneelers and copings. There are two storeys and in the gable ends are mullioned windows, and Venetian windows in the apices. In the return wall facing the farmhouse are paired doorways.	II
Former barn southeast of White Lee House; 53.73179°N 1.97775°W	—	Early 19th century	The barn, later used for other purposes, is in stone and has a stone slate roof with coped gables and kneelers. It contains a blocked arched cart entry with a keystone and a Venetian window above, and is flanked by doorways. Elsewhere are windows with plain surrounds.	II
Milestone at SD 998215; 53.69047°N 2.00407°W		1826	The milestone is on the southeast side of Blackstone Edge Road (B6138 road). It has a triangular plan and an arched head, and is overlaid in cast iron. On the top is "MYTHOLMROYD & BLACKSTONE EDGE ROAD SOWERBY" and on the lower faces are the distances to Rochdale, Mytholm Royd, and Halifax.	II
Milestone at SE 001229; 53.70270°N 1.99923°W		1826	The milestone is on the east side of Blackstone Edge Road (B6138 road). It has a triangular plan and an arched head, and is overlaid in cast iron. On the top is "MYTHOLMROYD & BLACKSTONE EDGE ROAD SOWERBY" and on the lower faces are the distances to Rochdale, Mytholm Royd, and Halifax.	II
Milestone at SE 008243; 53.71513°N 1.98920°W		1826	The milestone is on the east side of Blackstone Edge Road (B6138 road). It has a triangular plan and an arched head, and is overlaid in cast iron. On the top is "MYTHOLMROYD & BLACKSTONE EDGE ROAD ERRINGDEN" and on the lower faces are the distances to Rochdale, Mytholm Royd, and Halifax.	II
Owls Clough; 53.73837°N 1.98157°W	—	1826	A pair of cottages, later combined, the building is in stone with quoins, gutter brackets, and a stone slate roof with coped gables and kneelers. There are two storeys and two bays. The doorways, one of which is blocked, have monolithic jambs, and the windows are mullioned. In the right return is an arched window, and an inscribed and dated lintel.	II
Bridge Mill and chimney, Hebden Bridge; 53.74240°N 2.01234°W		c. 1830	The former watermill has been converted into shops and restaurants. It is in stone with a two-span stone slate roof, and has three storeys and an attic, and a double-depth plan. Facing the river are seven bays, and a circular chimney to the right. Facing the road are four bays and a canted corner containing segmental-arched entrances. Most of the windows have been replaced with small panes and upper casements.	II
Barn east of Frost Hole; 53.72053°N 2.00115°W	—	c. 1830	The barn is in stone, and has a stone slate roof with coped gables and kneelers. It contains arched cart entries, above which are mullioned windows with arched lintels and raised false keystones. In the gable apices are owl holes.	II
St James' Church, Hebden Bridge; 53.74342°N 2.02528°W		1832–33	A Commissioners' Church, it was restored and the chancel was rebuilt in 1874–76 by Richard Norman Shaw, and the south chancel aisle was remodelled as a chapel in 1903–04. The church is built in stone with a slate roof, and consists of a nave, a south porch, a chancel with a clerestory and aisles, and a west tower. The tower has three stages, angle buttresses rising to pinnacles, a doorway, a clock face, and an embattled parapet. The windows along the nave are lancets, and the east window is a three-light lancet.	II
Former Wesleyan Methodist Chapel, Cragg Vale; 53.70722°N 1.99758°W		1835	The chapel, later a private house, is in stone with quoins, an eaves band, and a stone slate roof. There are two storeys and a basement, and the front facing the road is symmetrical with three bays. It has a pedimented coped gable with an octagonal chimney stack finial, and contains a recessed plaque. The central doorway and windows have segmental-arched heads with imposts and keystones, and at the rear is a single-bay organ loft.	II
Bethesda Row, 14–18 Burnley Road; 53.73373°N 1.99071°W	—	Early to mid 19th century	A row of three cottages added to a terrace, they are in stone with a stone slate roof. There are two storeys, and every cottage has one bay. Each cottage has a doorway and the windows are mullioned.	II
St John's Church, Cragg Vale; 53.70534°N 2.00080°W		1839	A Commissioners' Church, it is in stone with a slate roof, and is in Early English style. The church consists of a nave, a shallow chancel, and a west tower. The tower has three stages, angle buttresses rising to form pinnacles, a north doorway, clock faces on the north and south fronts, and an embattled parapet. All the windows are lancets.	II
Calderside House and Rock Dene; 53.73922°N 2.03101°W	—	c. 1840	A house in dual occupation, it is in stone with a blue slate roof. The east front has four storeys and two bays, and it contains mullioned windows and a semicircular-arched stair window with an impost and a keystone. The west front has quoins, two storeys and a symmetrical front of three bays. It contains sash windows, and has a doorway with monolithic jambs.	II
Machpelah Works, Hebden Bridge; 53.73951°N 2.00892°W	—	c. 1840	A fustian warehouse, later used for other purposes, it is in stone with sill bands, an eaves cornice, and a stone slate roof. There are three storeys facing the road, four storeys facing the canal, and a front of seven bays, with a two-bay office extension on the left with one storey facing the road and two at the rear. The doorway has an architrave, a Tudor arched lintel, and a panelled fanlight. The windows in the upper floors are small-paned with central swivelled openings, and in the top floor the middle bay contains a taking-in door.	II
Railway viaduct, Mytholmroyd Station; 53.72929°N 1.98287°W		1840	The viaduct was designed by George Stephenson, and built by the Manchester and Leeds Railway to carry its line over New Road and the Cragg Brook. It is in stone and consists of three segmental arches. The bridge has voussoirs, impost bands on broad piers, a band, and a parapet with capping.	II
Whitely Arches Railway Viaduct, Hebden Bridge; 53.73927°N 2.03055°W		1840	The viaduct was designed by George Stephenson, and built by the Manchester and Leeds Railway to carry its line over Halifax Road. It is in stone and consists of three segmental skew arches. The bridge has voussoirs, a moulded band, a parapet, and wide square buttressed ends with large cappings.	II
Machpelah House, Hebden Bridge; 53.74024°N 2.00951°W		1842	The house is in millstone grit with a stone slate roof, three storeys, and three bays. In the ground floor is a former coach house entrance, and the doorway in the middle floor is approached by a flight of steps forming a bridge. The doorway has a Gibbs surround and a fanlight. The windows are sashes.	II
Broad Bottom, Mytholmroyd; 53.73583°N 1.98971°W	—	1844	The house is in stone and has a stone slate roof with coped gables and kneelers. There are two storeys and an attic, a double-pile plan, and two bays on the front and sides. All the windows have double chamfered mullions. The doorway in the right bay has an arched lintel, and above it is a four-light window. The windows in the left bay are cross windows with ten lights, the windows in the left return have five lights, and at the rear is a small-paned stair window.	II
St Michael's Church, Mytholmroyd; 53.73021°N 1.98118°W		1847–48	The south aisle and chapel were added in 1887–88. The church is built in stone with a slate roof, and consists of a nave, north and south aisles, a chancel with a south chapel and a north vestry, and a west tower. The tower has three stages, angle buttresses, a west doorway with a pointed arch, a west window with a trefoil head, a northeast octagonal stair turret with an octagonal spire rising higher than the tower, clock faces, and an embattled parapet.	II
1–19 Royd Terrace, Hebden Bridge; 53.74278°N 2.01416°W		1848	A terrace of stone houses with stone slate roofs. Nos. 1 and 3 have three storeys and the others have two. To the right of each doorway, and in each floor, is a two-light mullioned window with a plain surround containing one sash window and one fixed window.	II
50 Keighley Road, Hebden Bridge; 53.74620°N 2.00983°W	—	Mid 19th century	A stone house between two terraces, it has quoins, a stone slate roof, two storeys, and one bay. It contains a doorway and a mullioned window in each floor.	II
52–68 and 69 Keighley Road, Hebden Bridge; 53.74630°N 2.00996°W	—	Mid 19th century	A terrace of five house-over-house dwellings in stone, with quoins and a stone slate roof. On the front are two storeys and a basement entry, at the rear are three storeys, and each dwelling has one bay. Steps with cast iron railings lead down to the basement entries, there is another doorway in the ground floor, and the windows are mullioned.	II
19–41 Lees Road, Hebden Bridge; 53.74606°N 2.00991°W		Mid 19th century	A row of house-on-house dwellings, they are in stone with quoins, and a stone slate roof with coped gables and kneelers. There are six bays; the first two bays have three storeys and basements, and the others have two storeys and basements. The windows are mullioned.	II
Lodge, Brearley House; 53.73094°N 1.95946°W	—	Mid 19th century	The lodge is in stone on a plinth, with a string course, and a slate roof with coped gables. It is in Gothic style, and has one storey and an attic, and an L-shaped plan. In the gable end facing the road is a projecting chimney stack containing a recess with a coat of arms, and flanking it are ogee-headed windows. The windows have mullions and transoms, and the doorway has a moulded surround and a lean-to roof on a console pierced by a sexfoil.	II
Ewood Hall Barn; 53.73397°N 1.96844°W		Mid 19th century	A barn converted for residential use, it is in stone with a stone slate roof. There are two storeys and a front of five bays, the central bay gabled and containing a lunette. The building contains two round-arched cart entries with triple keystones, arched doorways, circular pitching holes with four keystones, and vents.	II
Green Field; 53.72812°N 1.96374°W	—	Mid 19th century	A stone house with an eaves cornice and a hipped slate roof. There are two storeys, a symmetrical front of three bays, and a double-pile rear range under a two-span roof. In the centre of the front is a doorway with a Gibbs surround and a triple keystone, and the windows are sashes.	II
High Stones Farmhouse and barn 53.70482°N 1.98403°W	—	Mid 19th century	A laithe house in stone with a stone slate roof, and quoins at the end of the barn. The house has two storeys, an outshut containing a doorway with monolithic jambs, and mullioned windows. The barn has an elliptical-arched cart entry with a raised impost and keystone, above which is a Venetian window, and is flanked by doorways with monolithic jambs.	II
Marshaw Bridge, Cragg Vale; 53.70544°N 2.00149°W		Mid 19th century (probable)	The bridge carries Church Bank Lane over Turvin Clough and Cragg Brook. It is in stone, and consists of a single segmental arch. The bridge has voussoirs and a dressed stone parapet.	II
Passenger stair-tower, Mytholmroyd Station; 53.72936°N 1.98261°W		Mid 19th century	The original booking office and stair tower to the station was built by the Manchester and Leeds Railway, and is in stone with a hipped slate roof. There are three storeys, and a symmetrical three-bay front to the road. The doorway has Tuscan pilasters, an entablature, and a cornice. Inside there is a passenger stairwell, and in the top floor is a waiting room with four bays, and a canopy on cast iron columns with decorative brackets.	II
Barn west of Green Field; 53.72806°N 1.96415°W	—	1851	A tall stone barn with a slate roof. It contains an arched carriage entrance with impost blocks and a keystone, set in an arched recess with a bull's-eye window and four keystones. There are also arrow-slit vents, doorways, two sash windows, a two-light mullioned window with arched lights, and a cast iron weathervane.	II
Victoria Bridge, Hebden Bridge; 53.73868°N 2.00933°W	—	1851	The bridge carries Station Road over the River Calder. It is in stone and consists of two segmental arches. The bridge has chamfered and bull-nosed cutwaters, a band and a parapet. The bank is supported by angled buttresses which slope down with copings ending in square piers with capping.	II
29 and 31 Royd Terrace, Hebden Bridge; 53.74315°N 2.01440°W	—	1852	A pair of houses in a terrace, they are in stone with a stone slate roof, and have three storeys. In the ground floor is a doorway with a cornice on consoles. The windows are sashes, and in the top floor they have three lights and mullions. In the top floor of No. 31 is a taking-in door.	II
Ewood Cottages; 53.73411°N 1.96858°W		1853	A row of five stone cottages with quoins, an eaves band, and a stone slate roof. They have two storeys and eleven bays. Each cottage has a doorway with a fanlight and sash windows, and in the left return is an initialled and dated tablet.	II
Hope Baptist Church and Sunday School; 53.74100°N 2.01246°W		1857	The church is in stone on a plinth, and has a slate roof. On the front are three bays flanked by giant Corinthian pilasters on moulded bases. Steps lead up to a central doorway that has panelled Corinthian pilasters, a fanlight, a plain frieze, and a moulded triangular pediment, and above it is a date plaque. In the outer bays are full-height windows with round heads and keystones. At the top of the front is an entablature, a bracketed cornice, and a full-width pediment. Along the sides are five bays divided by Tuscan pilasters. At the rear is a single-storey three-bay Sunday school with rusticated quoins, a hipped roof, a moulded eaves cornice, round-headed windows, and a pedimented doorway.	II
Wall, piers and gates, Hope Baptist Church; 53.74084°N 2.01248°W	—	1857	Enclosing the grounds in front of church are dwarf walls, gate piers and end piers; the gate piers are panelled and the end piers are rusticated. The gates are in cast iron.	II
Barn east of Great Burlees; 53.73977°N 2.00085°W	—	1859	The barn is in stone with a stone slate roof, and has three bays. It contains a segmental-arched cart entry with a re-used datestone, above which is a Venetian window with a keystone, and it is flanked by doorways and a single-light window.	II
Coach House, Ewood Hall; 53.73419°N 1.96942°W		1863	The coach house, later converted into two dwellings, is in stone, it has a hipped stone slate roof, and a symmetrical front of four bays, the middle two bays under a gable. In the centre are two semicircular-arched entries with rusticated surrounds and keystones with shields, above which are two lunettes with sills on consoles, a bull's eye window, and a carved coat of arms. The outer bays each contains an arched doorway. The rear, which faces the road, contains a single elliptical-headed entry, and in the gable apex is a dated plaque.	II
Ewood Gate House; 53.73122°N 1.97000°W	—	c. 1865	The gate house to Ewood House, now demolished, is in stone with rusticated quoins, an eaves band, moulded gutter brackets, a moulded cornice, and a pyramidal slate roof. There are two storeys, a square plan, and a symmetrical front of three bays, the middle bay projecting. In the centre is a doorway with engaged Corinthian columns and a segmental arch. The door has a segmental-arched fanlight with a keystone and an impost block. Above is an arched window with an architrave, and at the top is a broken pediment containing an oculus. The windows in the outer bays are sashes with architraves.	II
Park Top; 53.73420°N 1.97008°W		1865	A barn converted into two dwellings, it is in stone and has a tile roof. The east gable end has rusticated quoins, and contains an elliptical-arched cart entry with a rusticated surround and a keystone. Above this is a trefoil with a dated plaque, and over is a Venetian window and an oculus. Flanking these on each side is an arrow-slit vent, a circular pitching hole with four keystones, and a lunette with a moulded sill on consoles. Elsewhere are inserted mullioned windows.	II
Burlees House, Hangingroyd Lane; 53.74312°N 2.01347°W	—	Mid to late 19th century	A mill with a cast iron frame, later used for other purposes. It is clad in stone, and has three storeys, a hipped slate roof, a double-pile plan, a main front of nine bays. The front facing the road has seven bays and contains shop fronts in the ground floor.	II
6–14 Market Street, Hebden Bridge; 53.74149°N 2.01589°W		c. 1870	Originally shops with sewing workrooms above, later shops, offices and a bank, the building is in stone with a slate roof. There are three storeys and five bays, the bays divided by panelled pilasters, and there are decorative entablatures between the floors. In the ground floor are a bank front and shop fronts. The middle floor has a long window with a timber surrounds, each bay containing four arched lights with decorative mullions and carvings in the spandrels. In the top floor are three-light windows with aprons and keystones.	II
Upper Han Royd; 53.73773°N 1.96538°W		1876	A laithe house, incorporating some 17th-century material, it is in stone with quoins and a stone slate roof. The house has two storeys and two bays. The doorway has monolithic jambs, the windows are chamfered with mullions, and at the rear is a Venetian window. The barn has an arched cart entry with impost blocks and a keystone, a Venetian window above, and a doorway with monolithic jambs to the right.	II
Ewood Court; 53.73424°N 1.96712°W	—	1878	The house is in stone on a plinth, with a string course and an eaves band, and it has a stone slate roof with coped gables, kneelers, and finials. There are two storeys and an attic, and an H-shaped plan. The east front has five bays with an E-shaped plan, consisting of projecting wings and a full-height central porch. The porch has a moulded surround, a moulded impost, and an ogee lintel, and there is a circular window in the apex. All the windows are double-chamfered mullioned and transomed, those in the upper floor with hood moulds. In the return is a porch with rusticated quoins and a doorway with a Tudor arched lintel.	II
Stubbings Schools, Hebden Bridge; 53.74228°N 2.01090°W		1878	The school is in stone, and has a slate roof with coped gables and finials. There are two storeys, and a U-shaped plan, consisting of a hall range of five bays and projecting wings, the left wing projecting further. In the ground floor of the hall range is an arcade of five pointed arches, and the upper floor contains mullioned windows with segmental heads. The middle bay is gabled, and contains a three-light stepped lancet window with a quatrefoil above. Inside the hall is a hammerbeam roof.	II
Ewood Court Farmhouse; 53.73444°N 1.96784°W		1884	A barn that has been converted for residential use, it is in stone, and has two storeys and an attic, and an L-shaped plan. Features include mullioned windows, some also with transoms, a semicircular-arched cart entry with rusticated voussoirs, circular windows with four keystones, a Tudor arched doorway, and carriage entries with monolithic lintels on moulded corbels.	II
Hebden Bridge Signal Box; 53.73723°N 2.00798°W		1891	The signal box at the east end of the station was built by the Lancashire and Yorkshire Railway. There are two storeys, the lower storey in brick, the upper storey in timber, and it has a gabled roof in Welsh slate. The ground floor is on a plinth, and contains three segmental-arched windows. The upper floor has continuous glazing on the front and to the north. On the east side a flight of steel steps leads up to a doorway.	II
St George's Bridge; 53.74240°N 2.01269°W		1892	The bridge carries St George's Street over the Hebden Water. It consists of two cast iron slightly skewed girder arches on a central stone decorated pier with triangular cutwaters, sunken panels, and a brattished top. There are inscriptions on the pier and on the girders.	II
Hebden Bridge railway station 53.73775°N 2.00874°W		1892–93	The station was built by the Lancashire and Yorkshire Railway, and consists of platforms with canopies and waiting rooms, and a booking office with a station master's flat. The buildings are in stone with slate roofs. The booking office and flat is on a plinth, and has an eaves band and a Mansard roof. There is one storey with an attic, and it contains an arched entrance flanked by sash windows with cornices, the middle window above with a pediment. The booking office is flanked by single-storey extensions with hipped roofs.	II
District Council Office, Hebden Bridge; 53.74247°N 2.01295°W		1897	The former council office is in stone with a slate roof, and has two storeys and attics, and three bays. The left bay has an arched porch with a carved impost, a keystone, and a dated parapet, above which are mullioned and transomed windows. The middle bay contains a large oriel window with an ogee transom, and a swan-neck pediment. In the right bay is an arched entry with voussoirs. The right two bays each has a triangular pedimented gable containing a circular window, and between the bays are semi-octagonal buttresses with finials. In the left return is a chimney stack with a triangular pediment within a shaped gable.	II
The Barn House and barn, Brearley Hall; 53.72985°N 1.95493°W	—	1897	Originally an integral part of the hall, later a separate residence, with a barn attached, the building is in stone with a stone slate roof that has coped gables with kneelers and finials and a pierced quatrefoil in the apex. There are two storeys and three gabled bays. In the left bay is a semicircular-arched entrance to the rear, with a moulded impost. The middle bay contains a doorway with a moulded surround, a depressed Tudor arched head and a hood mould, and the windows are mullioned with hood moulds. The barn is at right angles, and contains a semicircular-arched cart entry, a mullioned window, arrow-slit vents, and a doorway.	II
Birchcliffe Centre, Hebden Bridge; 53.74349°N 2.00881°W		1898	A Baptist chapel, later a conference centre, it is in stone with a slate roof, and is in Palladian style. The main block has two storeys and three bays, and is flanked by pavilions. In the front is a single-storey porch with a five-bay Doric arcade carrying a dentilled cornice and a balustrade. The bays of the main block are divided by Ionic pilasters, with Doric pilasters at the corners. The bays contain windows with architraves and above the central window is a segmental pediment, and over this is a dentilled entablature and a triangular pediment. The pavilions have pediments and parapets with urns. The front of the building is approached by a flight of steps with a balustrade.	II
Steps and entrance archway, Birchcliffe Centre; 53.74333°N 2.00933°W		1898	At the entrance to the centre is a stone semicircular archway with moulded voussoirs and an impost that is flanked by rusticated quoins. The archway has a shaped gable with an inscription. The gates are in cast iron, and beyond the archway are steps.	II
St. John's Old Vicarage, Cragg Vale; 53.70584°N 2.00462°W		1901	A vicarage, later a private house, it is in stone, and has a slate roof with coped gables, kneelers, and ball finials. There are two storeys and attics, a front of three bays, and a rear wing with two gables. The outer bays are gabled, the left bay contains a two-storey bay window, and both bays have ten-light mullioned and transomed windows; the right bay also has an attic window. In the middle bay is a wide segmental archway that has Ionic pilasters, a moulded impost, and a keystone, above which is an entablature consisting of a balustraded balcony. At the rear is a doorway with a moulded surround and a shaped lintel, and in the right return is a canted bay window and an inscribed tablet.	II
Lodge, New Cragg Hall; 53.70552°N 2.00410°W		1906	The lodge was designed by Edgar Wood in Arts and Crafts style. It is in stone and has a stone slate roof with coped gables. There are two storeys, an L-shaped plan, and a front of two bays. In the left bay is an arched carriage entry and a four-light mullioned window above, and the right bay contains a two-storey canted bay window. The doorway in the archway has chamfered jambs and a false keystone. At the rear is an outshut, and a semi-octagonal stair tower.	II
Hebden Bridge Picture House and shops 53.74057°N 2.01263°W		1919–21	The cinema and shops are in brick with a stone front and a slate roof. A flight of eleven steps leads up to the central entrance which is flanked by giant Doric columns and pilasters carrying an entablature that continues to the sides. The outer bays contain shop fronts with recessed doorways, fanlights, and fascia boards, and above are three windows, the middle windows with a pediment. At the top of the building is a parapet, stepped in the middle.	II
Birchcliffe War Memorial, Hebden Bridge; 53.74334°N 2.00907°W		1922	The war memorial is in the grounds of the Birchcliffe Centre, and commemorates the members of the Birchcliffe Baptist Church lost during the First World War. It is in stone, and consists of a central cenotaph flanked by stepped curved curtain walls. In the centre of the cenotaph is an inscribed panel, above which is an egg and dart band and a bronze wreath. The walls to the sides have bronze panels with the names of those lost, flanked by inverted bronze torches. The memorial is approached by steps.	II
Mytholmroyd War memorial 53.73077°N 1.98219°W		c. 1922	The war memorial stands in a garden. It has a granite plinth, and consists of a white marble statue of a soldier in battle dress holding a rifle and standing on a rock. On the base is an inscription in commemoration of those who were lost in the First World War.	II
Telephone kiosk, Hebden Bridge; 53.74194°N 2.01187°W		1935	A K6 type telephone kiosk in St George's Square, it was designed by Giles Gilbert Scott. Constructed in cast iron with a square plan and a dome, it has three unperforated crowns in the top panels.	II
