= Hebden Bridge railway station =

Railway station in West Yorkshire, England

Hebden Bridge
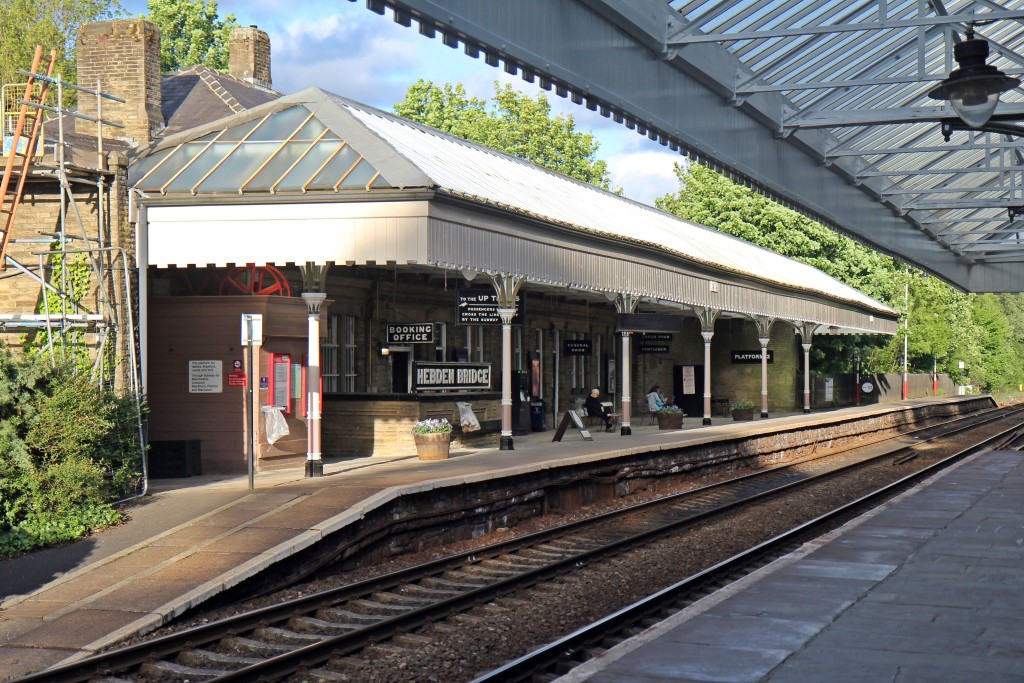
- A view of platform 2 in 2015

General information
- Location: Hebden Bridge, Calderdale; England
- Coordinates: 53.7377°N 2.0088°W
- Grid reference: SD994268
- Managed by: Northern
- Transit authority: West Yorkshire (Metro)
- Platforms: 2

Other information
- Station code: HBD
- Fare zone: 5
- Classification: DfT category E

History
- Original company: Manchester and Leeds Railway
- Pre-grouping: Lancashire and Yorkshire Railway
- Post-grouping: London, Midland and Scottish Railway

Key dates
- 5 October 1840: Opened
- 1893: Current station buildings opened
- 1997: Refurbished

Passengers
- 2020/21: ▼0.164 million
- Interchange: ▼7,730
- 2021/22: ▲0.570 million
- Interchange: ▲26,139
- 2022/23: ▲0.680 million
- Interchange: ▲33,481
- 2023/24: ▲0.766 million
- Interchange: ▼31,189
- 2024/25: ▲0.908 million
- Interchange: ▲35,136
Location
Notes
- Passenger statistics from the Office of Rail and Road

Hebden Bridge railway station serves the town of Hebden Bridge in West Yorkshire, England. The station is on the Calder Valley line, operated by Northern since April 2016, from York and Leeds towards Manchester Victoria and Preston. The station is 8.5 miles (14 km) west of Halifax and 26 miles (42 km) west of Leeds.

== History ==
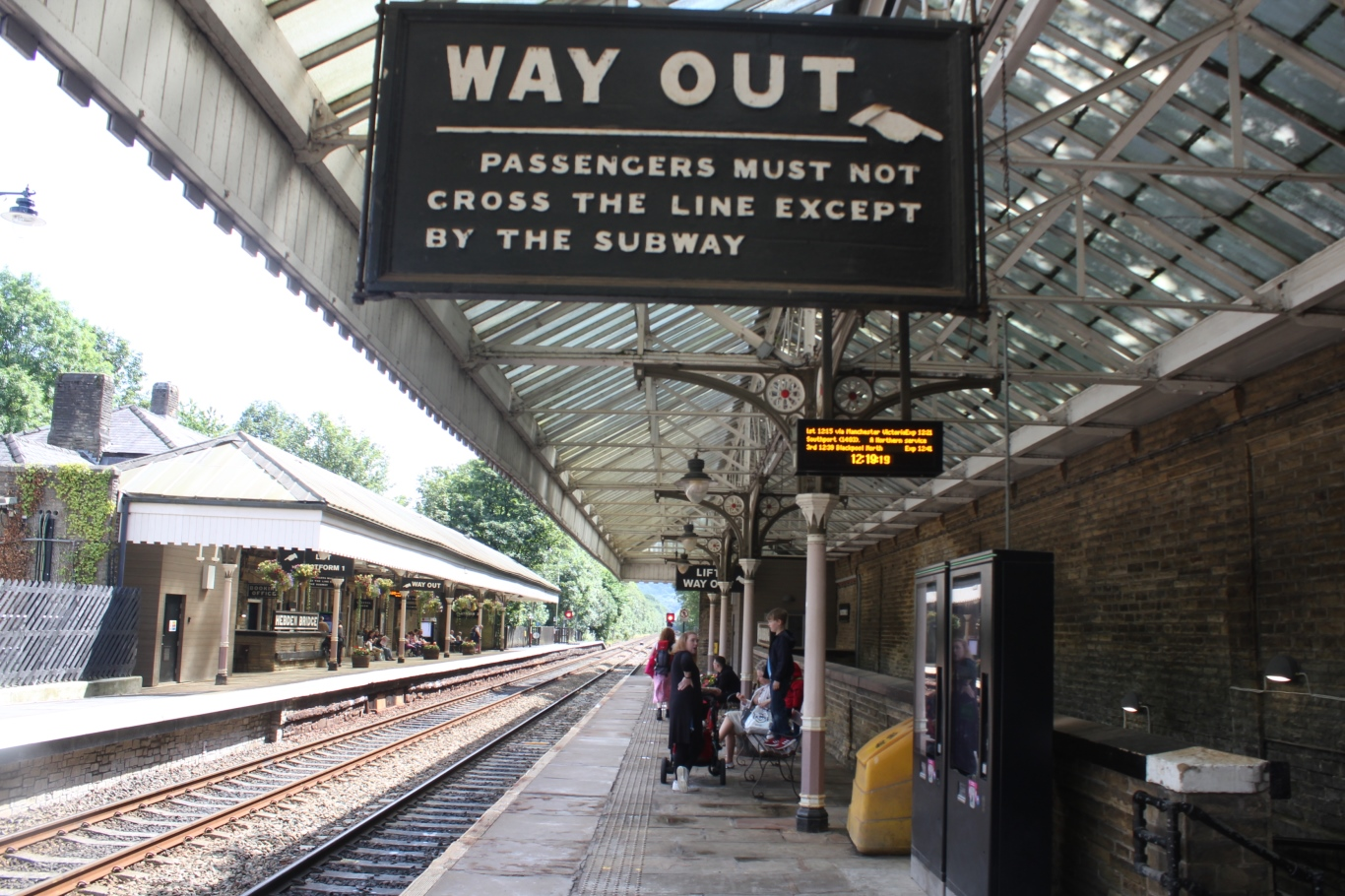
Some of the L&YR-style signs

The Manchester and Leeds Railway, authorised in 1836 for a line from Manchester to Normanton, was opened in stages; the second section, between Normanton and Hebden Bridge, opened on 5 October 1840. Trains arrived at Hebden Bridge from Normanton and passengers would then continue to Littleborough by road. The section between Hebden Bridge and Summit Tunnel opened on 31 December 1840, allowing trains to reach Todmorden; after Summit Tunnel opened on 1 March 1841, trains continued to Littleborough and Manchester. An 1841 timetable shows five Manchester to Leeds trains per day calling at Hebden Bridge (two on Sundays), all but one of which called at all stations; a similar service ran in the opposite direction. Trains began operating to Halifax and Bradford in 1852, and could run through to Leeds via this route from 1854.

The current buildings date from 1893, construction having started in 1891. By this point there was a goods yard alongside the station. This closed in 1966 and the site is now the station car park. In 1997 the station was renovated, and signage in the original Lancashire and Yorkshire Railway style was installed.

On 21 June 1912 a train derailed nearby, killing four people and injuring many others. The official inquiry found that the train was running too fast on the Charlestown Curve, a tight curve near the station.

== Facilities ==
The station has a staffed ticket office, waiting rooms, toilets and a cafe. New lifts have been installed to make both platforms fully accessible (commissioned in March 2019), and Information screens were installed in 2012 as part of a programme to provide screens at 18 stations on the Calder Valley Line and elsewhere in West Yorkshire. Previously, passengers had to rely on automated public-address system announcements.

== Services ==
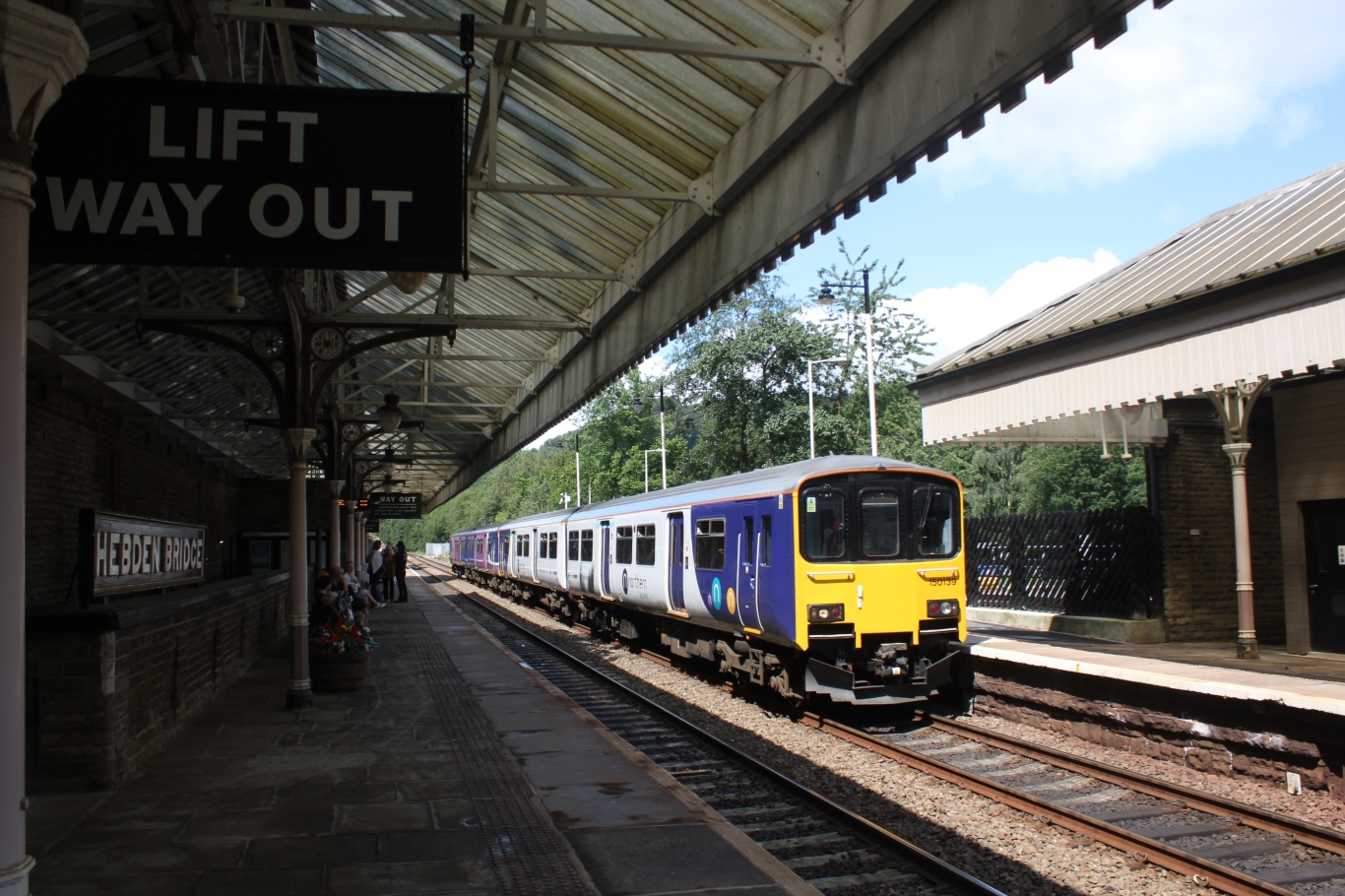
Northern Class 150s with a service to Leeds

As of December 2025, the weekday off-peak service pattern is as follows:

- 1 tph to Chester via Rochdale, Manchester Victoria and Warrington Bank Quay
- 1 tph to Wigan Wallgate via Rochdale, Manchester Victoria and Walkden
- 1 tph to Manchester Victoria via Todmorden and Rochdale
- 1 tph to Blackpool North via Burnley Manchester Road, Blackburn and Preston
- 2 tph to Leeds via Halifax, Bradford Interchange and New Pudsey
- 1 tph to Leeds via Brighouse, Mirfield and Dewsbury
- 1 tph to York via Halifax, Bradford Interchange and Leeds

The station is the only station on the Calder Valley Line where every service calls. On Monday to Saturday during daytime there are four trains per hour to Leeds – one via Brighouse and Dewsbury and the other three via Bradford Interchange (one serving all stations to Bradford and two calling at Halifax only). Of the latter, one runs through to York. In the late evening, the service drops to half-hourly, all via Bradford.

Westbound there are three trains per hour to Manchester Victoria (hourly evenings and Sundays), and an hourly service to Blackpool North via Burnley Manchester Road and Blackburn (direct weekday services there were temporarily stopped in November 2017 but have resumed from the May 2019 timetable change). One of the Manchester trains is a limited-stop service, calling at Todmorden and Rochdale only, whilst the service via Dewsbury continues to Wigan Wallgate. The other Manchester service now extends through to Warrington Bank Quay and Chester.

From November 2013 to late March 2014 the line to Burnley was closed for major repair work on Holme Tunnel. A replacement bus service ran, and trains from York terminated/started at Hebden Bridge.

== Future improvements ==
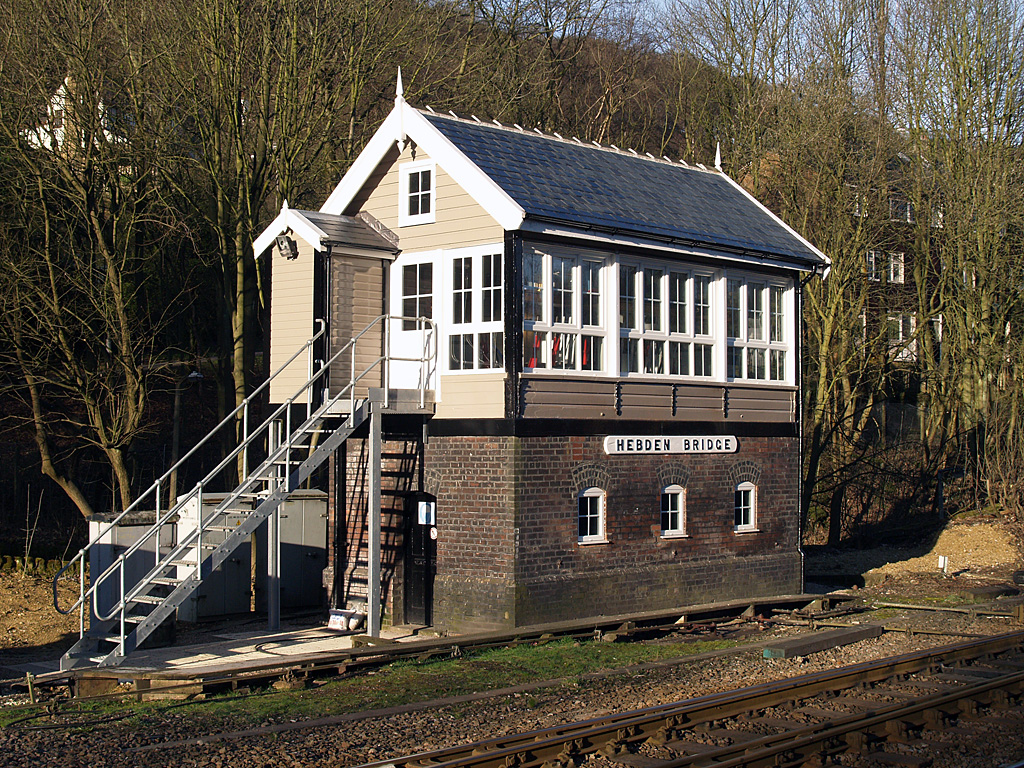
Hebden Bridge signal box is Grade II listed

The station will see a variety of improvements to facilities and train services from March 2017 onwards, as part of an investment package for the Calder Valley line as a whole. Track and signalling upgrades have helped reduce journey times in both directions and allow more trains to run to/from Bradford. This has resulted in the closure of the listed signal box here in October 2018, with control passing over to the Rail Operating Centre at York. New rolling stock and timetable improvements will follow, with regular through trains to Liverpool Lime Street, Manchester Airport and Chester by late 2019 (the latter service began at the May 2019 timetable change). The remaining improvements have since been indefinitely postponed because of capacity problems in central Manchester, though new rolling stock (in the form of Class 195 Civity DMUs) has started to appear on some routes.

== See also ==
- Listed buildings in Hebden Royd

Preceding station	National Rail	Following station
Todmorden	Northern; Caldervale Line	Mytholmroyd
Burnley Manchester Road	Northern; Caldervale Line	Halifax
	Disused railways	
Eastwood	L&YR; Caldervale Valley Line	Mytholmroyd
