= Jane Campbell =

Jane Campbell may refer to:

- Jane Campbell, Viscountess Kenmure (died 1675) Scottish aristocrat
- Jane Campbell, Baroness Campbell of Surbiton (born 1959), Commissioner of the Equality and Human Rights Commission
- Jane L. Campbell (born 1953), American politician
- Jane Campbell (table tennis) (born 1968), British Paralympic table tennis player
- Jane Campbell (soccer) (born 1995), American soccer goalkeeper
- Jane Cannon Campbell, American Revolutionary War patriot
- Jane Montgomery Campbell, British musician and poet
- Jane Maud Campbell, American librarian
- Jane Campbell (writer) (born 1942), British writer

== See also ==
- Lady Jeanne Campbell (1928–2007), British socialite
- Janey Sevilla Callander (married name Campbell, 1846–1923), British theatre producer and society hostess
