= John O'Neill (VC) =

British Army officer and a Scottish recipient of the Victoria Cross (VC)

- Born: 10 February 1897; Airdrie, North Lanarkshire, Scotland
- Died: 16 October 1942 (aged 45); Hoylake, Cheshire, England
- Burial place: Holy Trinity churchyard, Hoylake, Cheshire, England
- Military career
- Allegiance: United Kingdom
- Branch: British Army
- Rank: Lieutenant
- Service number: 4119 (World War I); 144348 (World War II)
- Units: Prince of Wales's Leinster Regiment; Auxiliary Military Pioneer Corps
- Conflicts: World War I World War II
- Awards: Victoria Cross; Military Medal; Order of Leopold II (Belgium); Medaille Militaire (France)

Lieutenant John O'Neill VC MM (also spelt O'Niell) (10 February 1897 − 16 October 1942) was a British Army officer and a Scottish recipient of the Victoria Cross (VC), the highest and most prestigious award for gallantry in the face of the enemy that can be awarded to British and Commonwealth forces.

O'Neill was 21 years old, and a sergeant in the 2nd Battalion, Prince of Wales's Leinster Regiment, British Army during the First World War when in October 1918 near Moorsele, Belgium, he won the Victoria Cross.

The citation reads:

No. 4119 Sjt. John O'Niell, [sic] M.M., 2nd Bn., Leins. R. (Glenboig). For most conspicuous bravery and devotion to duty near Moorseele on 14th October, 1918, when the advance of his company was checked by two machine guns and an enemy field battery firing over open sights. At the head of eleven men only he charged the battery, capturing four field guns, two machine guns and sixteen prisoners. Again, on the morning of the 20th October, 1918, Sjt. O'Niell, with one man, rushed an enemy machine-gun position, routing about 100 enemy and causing many casualties. Throughout the operations he displayed the most remarkable courage and powers of leadership.

— The London Gazette, 26 December 1918

O'Neill later served in the RAF as an armourer sergeant where he served alongside T. E. Lawrence

On 1 June 1940 O'Neill was commissioned as a lieutenant in the Auxiliary Military Pioneer Corps. In that year he was an officer on HMT Dunera, taking to Australia "enemy aliens", most of whom were German Jews. Possessions of the internees were rifled through and stolen. He appeared as a witness at a subsequent court martial. The internees used the Russian song "Stenka Rassin" with new ironic German text:

1. Strophe:	1. verse:
Deponiert auf der Dunera	We're being deported on the Dunera
und Australien ist das Ziel.	Australia is our destination;
Uns're Koffer sind erbrochen,	Our suitcases have been forced open
uns're Hemden trägt O'Neill.	Lt. O'Neill now wears our shirts.

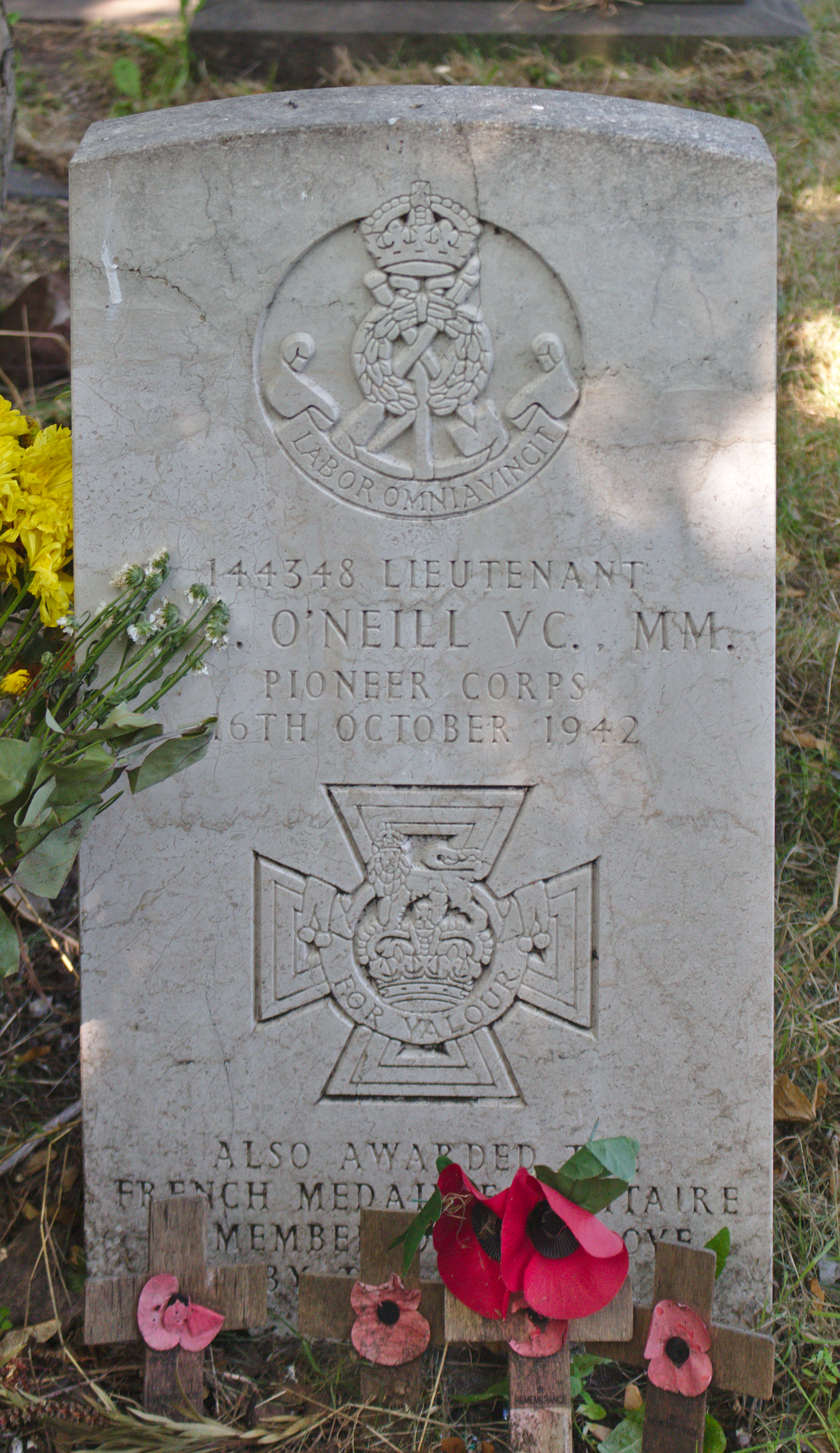
O'Neill's CWGC gravestone at Holy Trinity, Hoylake

John O'Neill died of a heart attack on 16 October 1942. He is buried at Holy Trinity Church, Hoylake, in The Wirral.

== Bibliography ==
- Ross, Graham (1995). Scotland's Forgotten Valour. MacLean Press. ISBN 978-1899272006.
- Gliddon, Gerald (2014) [2000]. The Final Days 1918. VCs of the First World War. The History Press. ISBN 978-0-7509-5368-9.
