= Hoylake Town Hall =

Municipal building in Hoylake, Merseyside, England

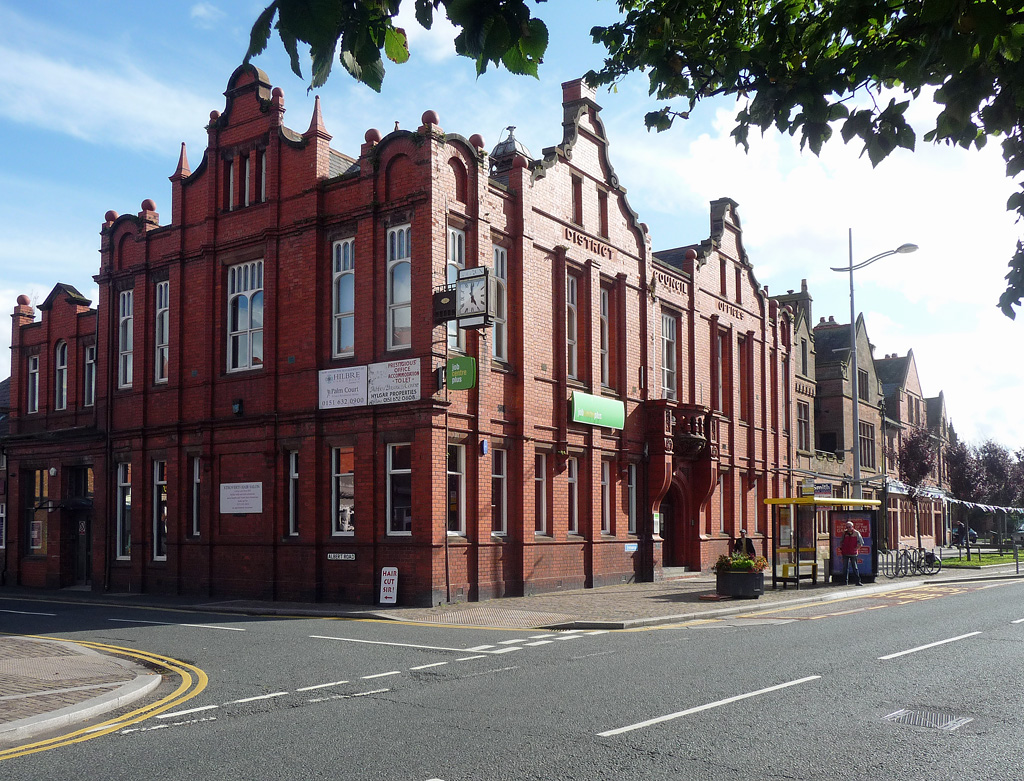
- The building in 2014

- Shown in Merseyside
- 53.3908°N 3.1794°W
- Location: Market Street, Hoylake

History
- Built: 1898

Site notes
- Architectural style: Edwardian Baroque style

Hoylake Town Hall is a former municipal building in Market Street in Hoylake, a town in Merseyside, in England.

== History ==
Following significant population growth, largely associated with the fishing industry, a local board of health was established in the area in 1891. The local board of health was replaced by Hoylake and West Kirby District Council in 1894. The new council decided to commission dedicated council offices: the site they selected was open land on the southeast side of Market Street.

The new building was designed in the Edwardian Baroque style, built in red brick with terracotta finishes and was completed in 1898. The design involved a symmetrical main frontage of 13 bays facing onto Market Street. The central bay featured a round headed doorway with an architrave and brackets supporting a semi-circular balustraded balcony: there were fine carvings below the balcony and there was a French door on the first floor. The wing sections of four bays each, which were surmounted by stepped gables, were fenestrated by four tall windows on the ground floor, two tall windows on the first floor and two smaller windows at attic level. The end sections of two bays each were fenestrated by pairs of tall windows on both floors. The bays were separated by pilasters surmounted by finials. Internally, the building accommodated a council chamber, offices for council officers and garaging for the town's fire brigade.

In September 1914, at the start of the First World War, the building was used as the venue for a recruiting drive for the 13th (Service) Battalion, the Cheshire Regiment, known informally as the "Wirral Pals". At the end of the war a large procession walked from the town hall to the public hall in West Kirby to honour the service of Captain Cyril Edward Gourley of the Royal Field Artillery who was awarded the Victoria Cross for bravery during the Battle of Cambrai.

The council was succeeded, in 1933, by the Hoylake Urban District Council, which continued to use the building as its headquarters. During Warship Week in 1942, local people raised funds to pay for a destroyer, HMS Verdun; a plaque was subsequently placed in the town hall to acknowledge the fund raising effort. The town hall ceased to be the local seat of government when the enlarged Wirral Council was formed in 1974. The building then accommodated a jobcentre until it closed in 2017.

The building was subsequently sold to a developer, Hylgar Properties, who announced plans to convert it into an arts centre, cinema, cafe, restaurant and shops. The developer secured financing of £3.6 million from the Coastal Communities Fund in February 2018 and planning consent from Wirral Council in August 2018. Initial work on the project, which included internal demolition and new roofing, started in late 2019. However, as of October 2022, because of the impact of the COVID-19 pandemic, limited progress had been made on the second stage of the project, which included the fit-out of the arts centre, cinema, cafe, restaurant and shops.
