= Manor Road railway station =

Railway station serving both Hoylake and Meols, Merseyside, England

Coordinates: 53.395°N 3.171°W

Manor Road
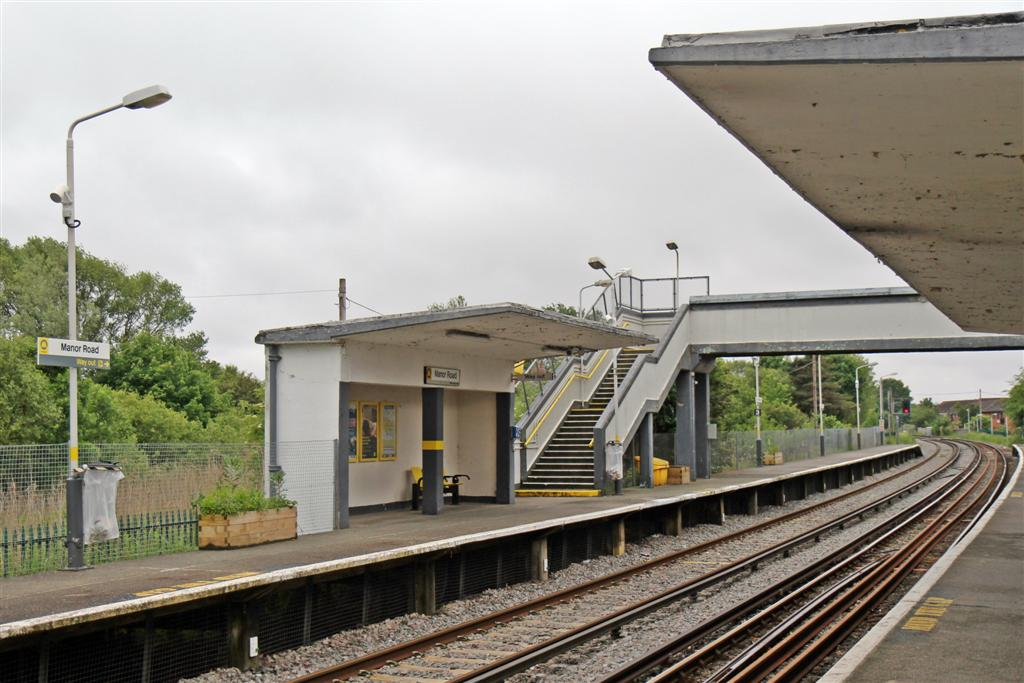
- Platforms and footbridge.

General information
- Location: Hoylake, Wirral; England
- Grid reference: SJ222893
- Manager: Merseyrail
- Transit authority: Merseytravel
- Platforms: 2

Other information
- Station code: MNR
- Fare zone: B2
- Classification: DfT category E

Key dates
- 1940: Opened

Passengers
- 2021/22: ▲0.207 million
- 2022/23: ▲0.241 million
- 2023/24: ▲0.269 million
- 2024/25: ▲0.293 million
- 2025/26: ▲0.344 million
Location
Notes
- Passenger statistics from the Office of Rail and Road

Manor Road railway station is a station in Merseyside, England that serves the towns of Hoylake and Meols. It is located on the West Kirby branch of the Wirral Line, part of the Merseyrail network.

== History ==
The station was proposed in 1936 and opened on 15 May 1940 by the London Midland and Scottish Railway, after their electrification of the former Wirral Railway route from Birkenhead to West Kirby. This allowed for through trains to run between Liverpool and West Kirby.

== Facilities ==
The station is fully staffed during opening hours and has CCTV cameras on the platform. Each platform has a sheltered seating area for passengers waiting for trains. There is a payphone, booking office and live departure and arrival screens, for passenger information. The station does not have a car park, but does have a secure cycle storage for 10 cycles. There is step-free access available only for the Liverpool-bound platform, for wheelchairs and prams.

== Services ==
Trains run every 15 minutes (Monday to Saturday during the day) between West Kirby and Liverpool. At other times, trains operate every 30 minutes. These services are all provided by Merseyrail's fleet of Class 777 EMUs.

== Gallery ==
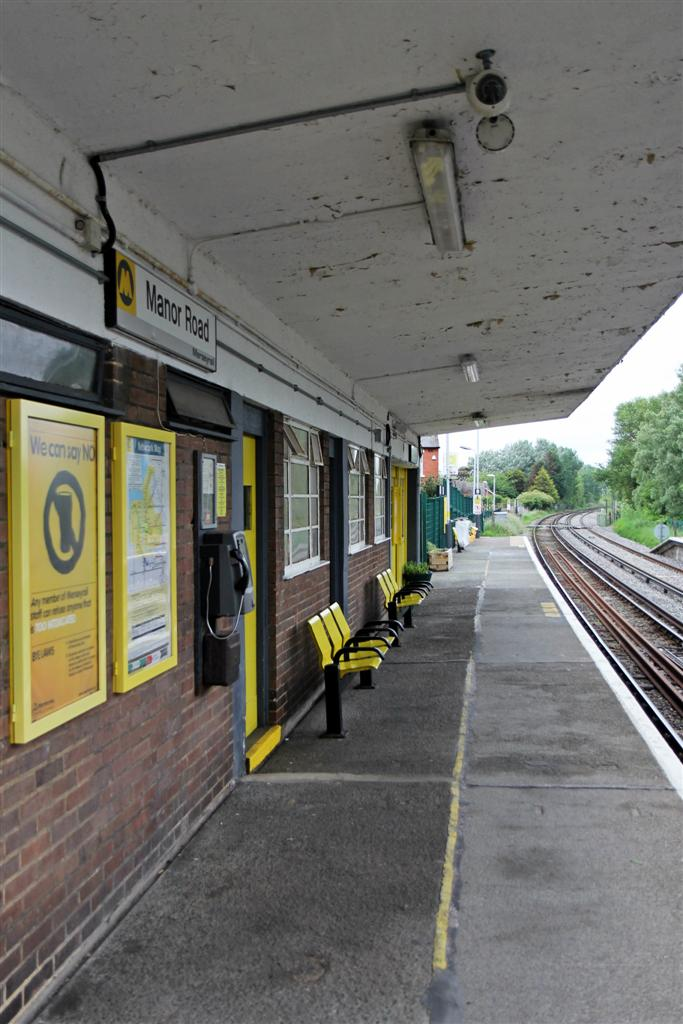
On the Liverpool-bound platform, looking towards Meols.

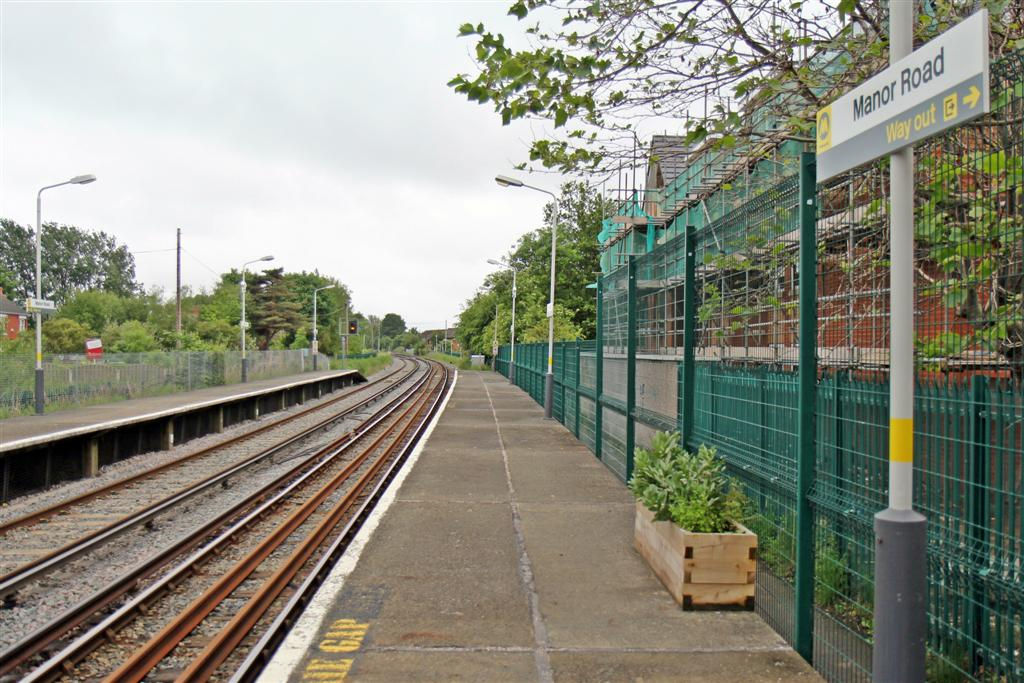
A view in the direction of West Kirby.

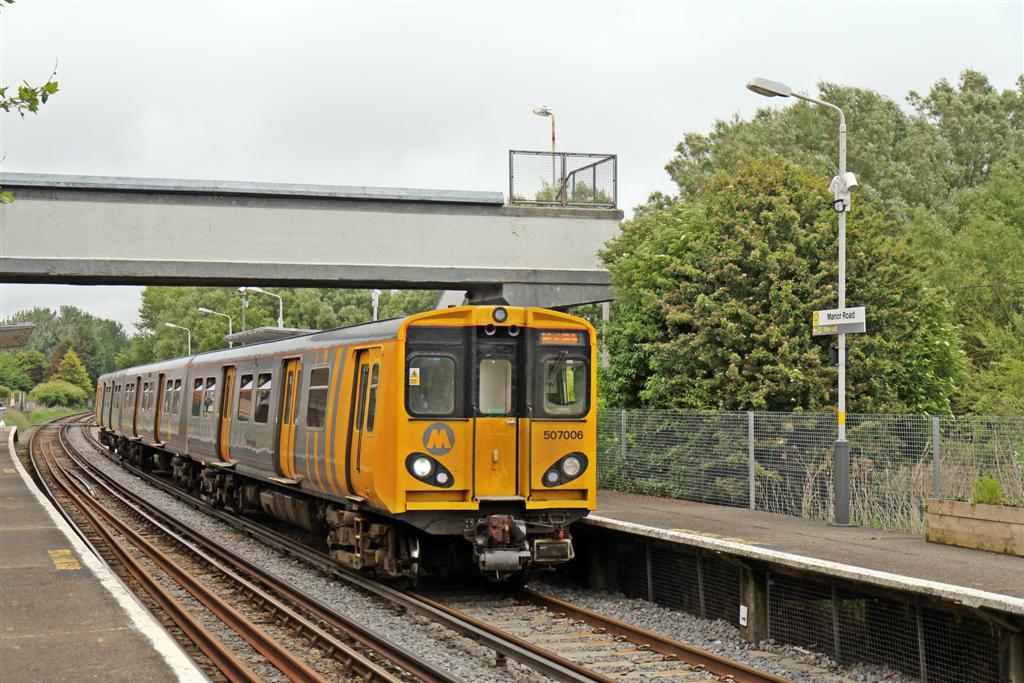
A Merseyrail Class 507 on the West Kirby-bound platform.

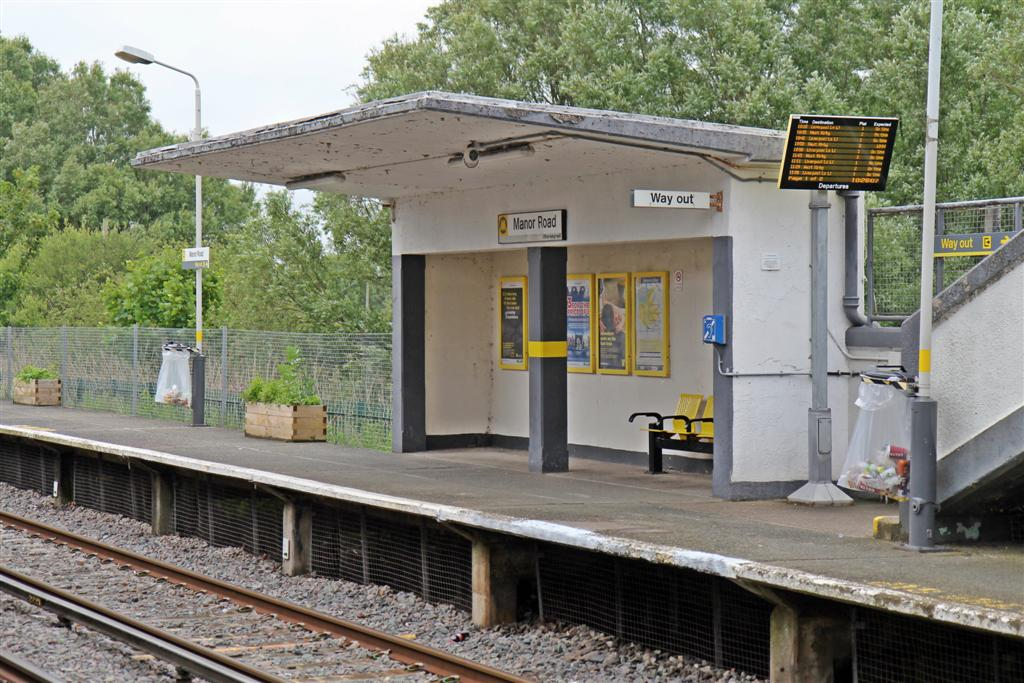
The waiting shelter on the West Kirby-bound platform.

Preceding station	National Rail	Following station
Hoylake towards West Kirby	Merseyrail; Wirral Line; West Kirby Branch	Meols towards Liverpool Central
