= Holy Trinity Church, Hoylake =

Former church in Hoylake, Wirral England

Coordinates: 53.396°N 3.178°W

Holy Trinity Church was an Anglican church in the seaside town of Hoylake, Wirral, England, until its demolition in 1976. It was consecrated on 1 November 1833, and in 1860 it became the Parish Church of Hoose, Little Hoose and Great Hoose. During its lifetime, two daughter churches were built, the nearby St Hildeburgh's, which is now used as the parish church for Hoylake, and St John's, now the parish church for Meols.

Well-known former choristers include, Heather Slade-Lipkin - harpsichordist, Pete Price - local radio presenter and DJ, and David Hale - judge.

== Demolition ==
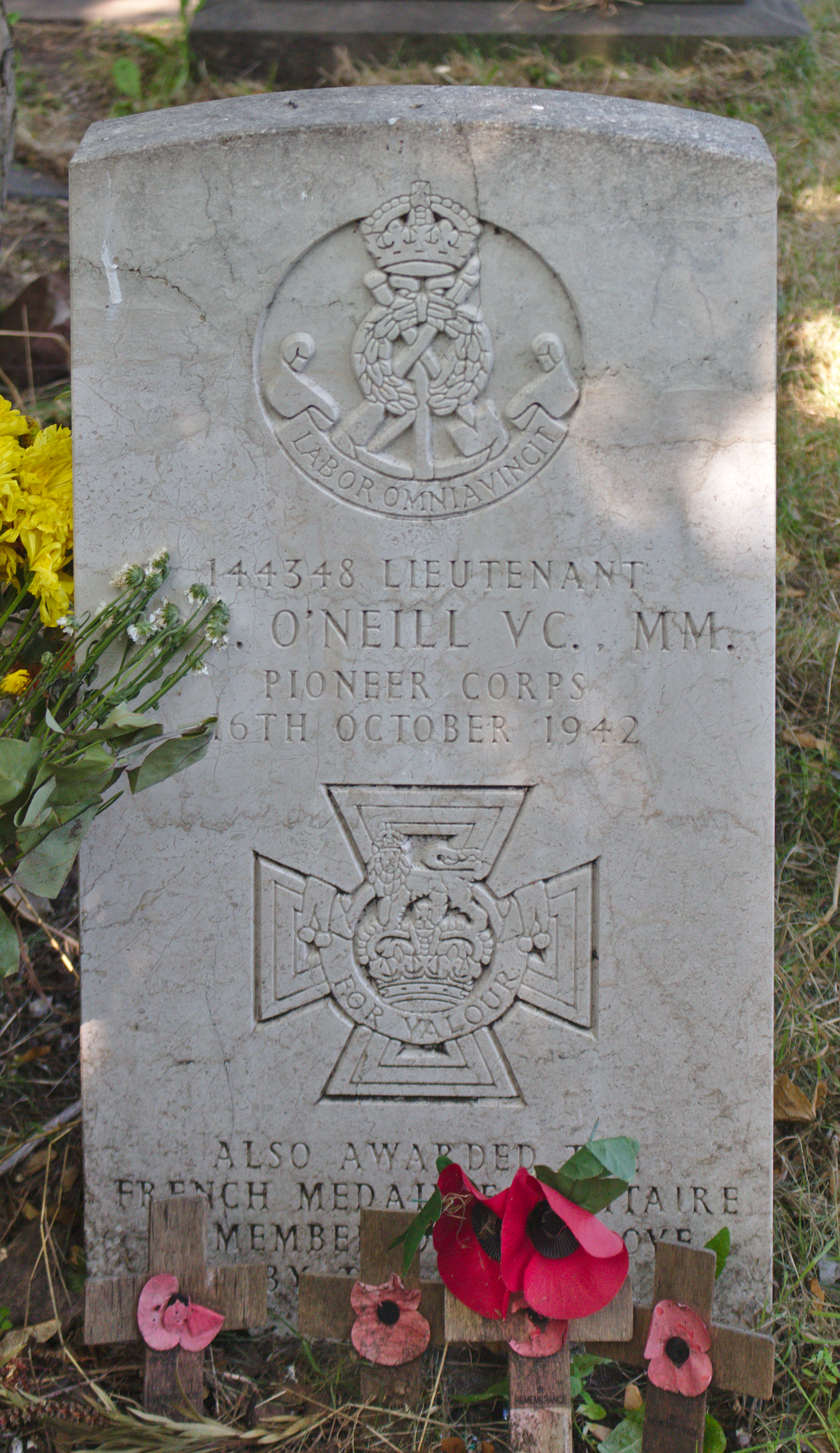
Victoria Cross holder John O'Neill's CWGC gravestone at Holy Trinity

All that remains of Holy Trinity church today is the graveyard, housing over 200 gravestones and memorials. They include the war graves of 23 Commonwealth service personnel, 11 of World War I and 12 of World War II. Among them is John O'Neill VC.

Trinity Road was called Church Road, but the name was changed as not to confuse with Church Road in nearby West Kirby.

The first Holy Trinity, was consecrated in 1834 but declared unsafe and closed in 1974 & demolished soon after, so St Hildeburgh's became the parish church.

Julian Lennon, son of John Lennon was christened in this church in 1963. His mother Cynthia was living in Trinity Road, almost opposite the church at the time.

== Notes ==
- St Hildeburgh's Church website
