= Hoylake railway station =

Railway station serving Hoylake, Wirral, Merseyside, England

Coordinates: 53.390°N 3.179°W

Hoylake
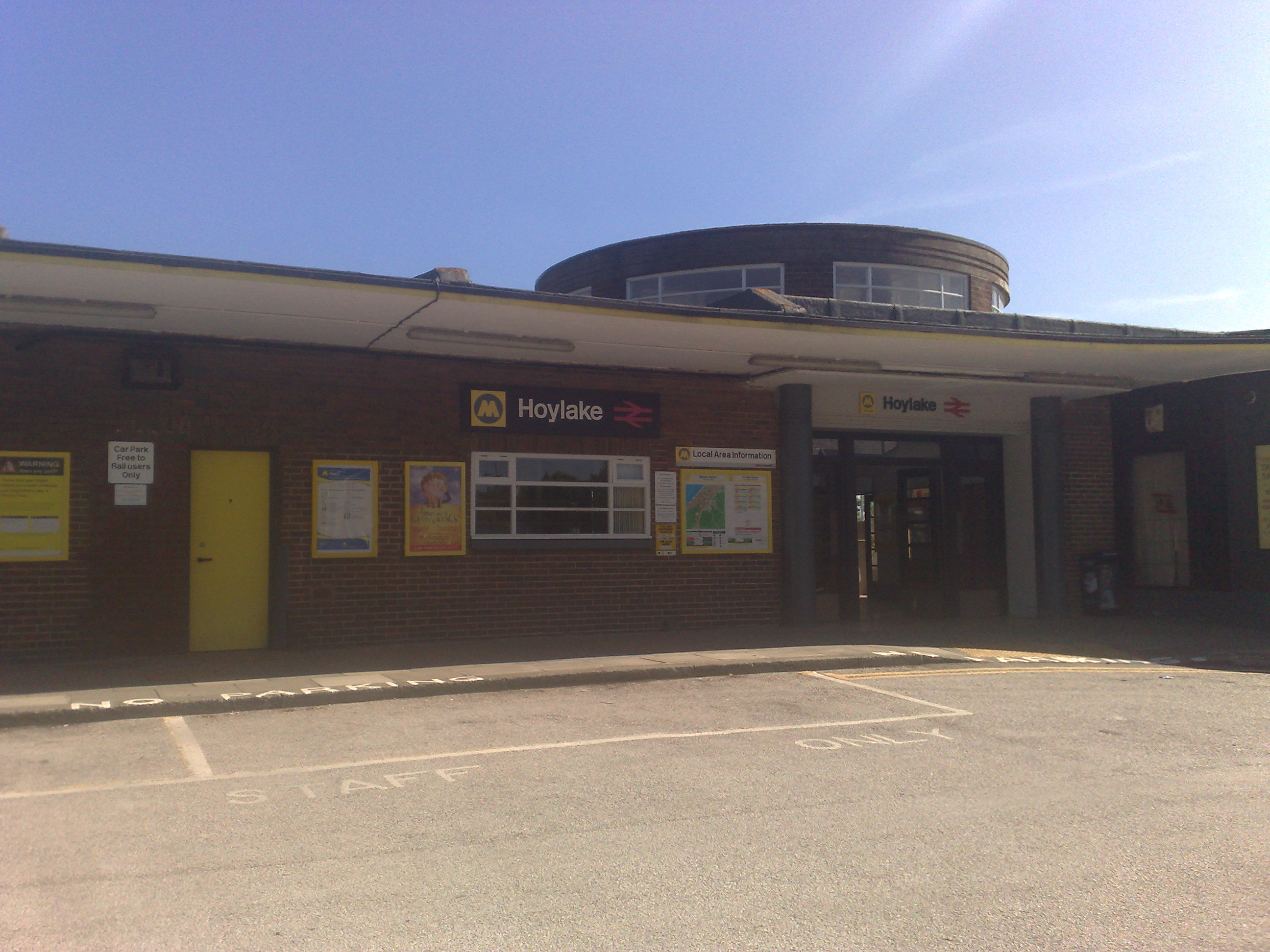
- Hoylake railway station as viewed from the car park

General information
- Location: Hoylake, Wirral; England
- Grid reference: SJ216887
- Manager: Merseyrail
- Transit authority: Merseytravel
- Platforms: 2

Other information
- Station code: HYK
- Fare zone: B2
- Classification: DfT category E

Key dates
- 1866: Opened
- 1938: Rebuilt and electrified

Passengers
- 2021/22: ▲0.369 million
- 2022/23: ▲0.418 million
- 2023/24: ▲0.561 million
- 2024/25: ▼0.470 million
- 2025/26: ▲0.560 million
Location
Notes
- Passenger statistics from the Office of Rail and Road

Hoylake railway station serves the town of Hoylake, Merseyside, England. It lies on the West Kirby branch of the Wirral Line, part of the Merseyrail network.

== History ==
The station was opened to regular service on 2 July 1866, as part of the Hoylake Railway to Birkenhead Dock railway station. The station originally had low cinder-filled platforms. An extension to West Kirby was opened on 1 April 1878, and the line from West Kirby was doubled in 1896. The station had a signal box which was originally built at the eastern end of the station and provided in 1889. The 21-lever signal box was moved, to be adjacent to the level crossing, in 1895.

From no later than 1901, there were several sidings to the east of the station. There was a carriage shed and a Wirral Railway paint shop from prior to 1912. The paint shop was closed after the LMS takeover.

=== 1938 LMS rebuild and electrification ===
Prior to 1938, the station was of varying architectural styles. Built in 1938 adjoining the Up platform, the current station building, designed by the architect William Henry Hamlyn, is in the Art Deco style, with a circular clerestory over the booking hall, becoming a Grade II Listed Building in 1988. The sign currently on display in front of the station was recently restored during a renovation. The adjoining footbridge was built at the same time as the Art Deco building, and new level crossing gates were installed. The goods yard had a 5-ton crane from 1938.

Through electric services to Liverpool Central commenced on 13 March 1938, when the LMS electrified the lines from Birkenhead Park to West Kirby. The service was provided by the then-new LMS electric multiple units. However, on Sunday mornings, the service was provided by the older Mersey Railway electric units which, up until that point, had only ever run from Liverpool to Birkenhead Park.

=== Since WWII ===
The multiple sidings to the east of the station continued to be used until 1965. They were used both to store out-of-service electric trains and to serve a freight depot receiving coal for domestic distribution, and also to fuel the gasworks situated alongside the line at this point which lasted until 1954. The signal box, which had a manual gate wheel for the level crossing, was closed on 17 September 1994 and demolished a few days later.

When the Open Golf Championship was held at the Royal Liverpool Golf Club (situated between West Kirby and Hoylake) in July 2006, September 2012, July 2014 and July 2023, services terminated here during the tournament. This was to allow competitors and public to cross the tracks from the practice course on one side to the championship course on the other. This caused some controversy in West Kirby locally in 2006, especially given the increase in passengers during the championship. A rail replacement bus service was put in place between Hoylake and West Kirby.

== Facilities ==
The station is staffed during all opening hours, and has platform CCTV. Each of the two platforms has a seated waiting shelter. There is a payphone, booking office and live departure and arrival screens, for passenger information. The station provides a "Park and Ride" service. There are a further 167 car parking spaces, which are free to use for travellers, with lighting columns and CCTV to meet Merseytravel's Travelsafe requirements, as well as a 14-space cycle rack. There is step-free access available to both platforms by the use of the level crossing.

== Services ==
Current services are every 15 minutes (Monday to Saturday daytime) to West Kirby and Liverpool. At other times, trains operate every 30 minutes. Services are provided by Merseyrail's fleet of Class 777 EMUs.

== Gallery ==
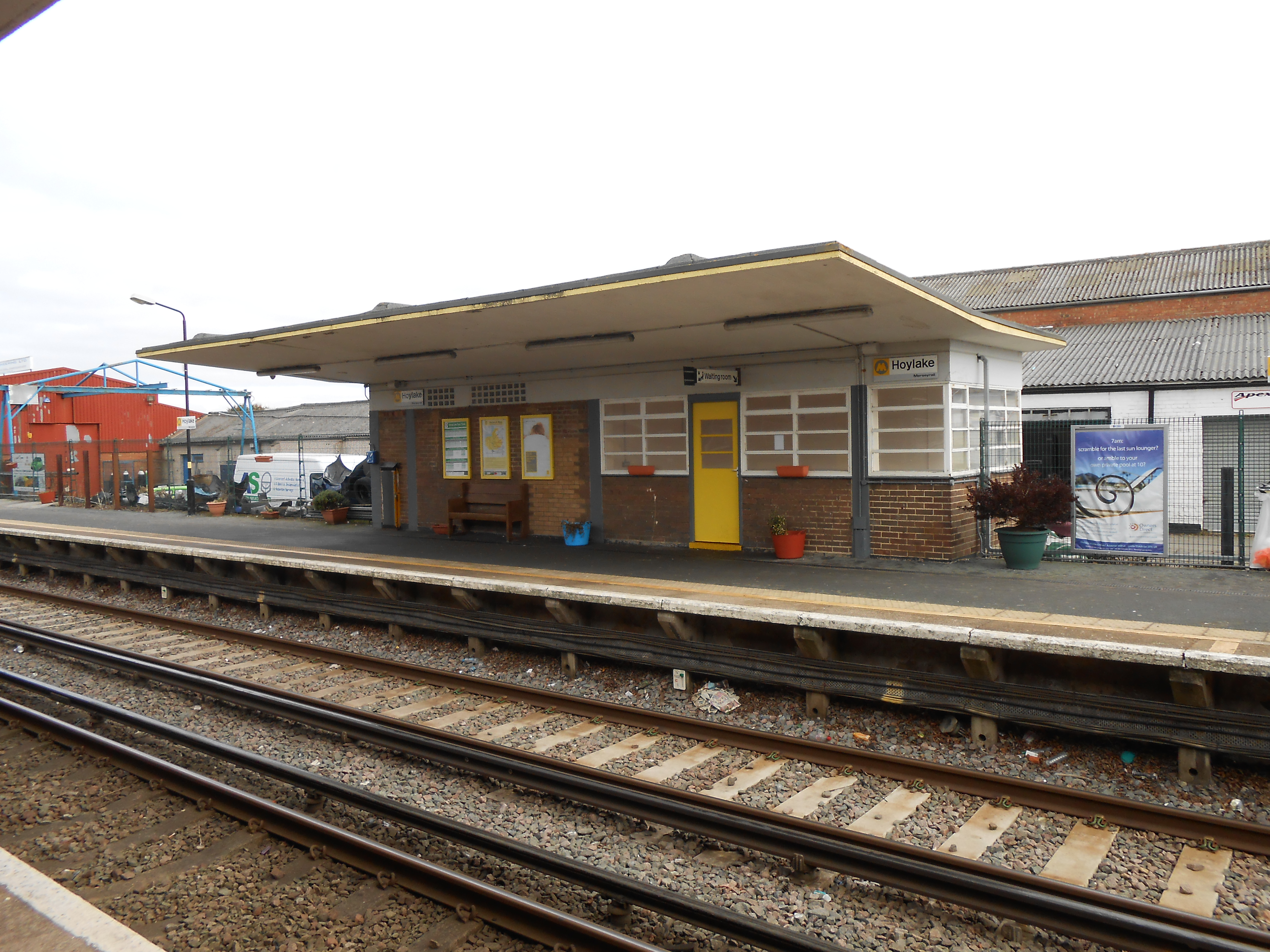
The waiting room on the West Kirby-bound platform.

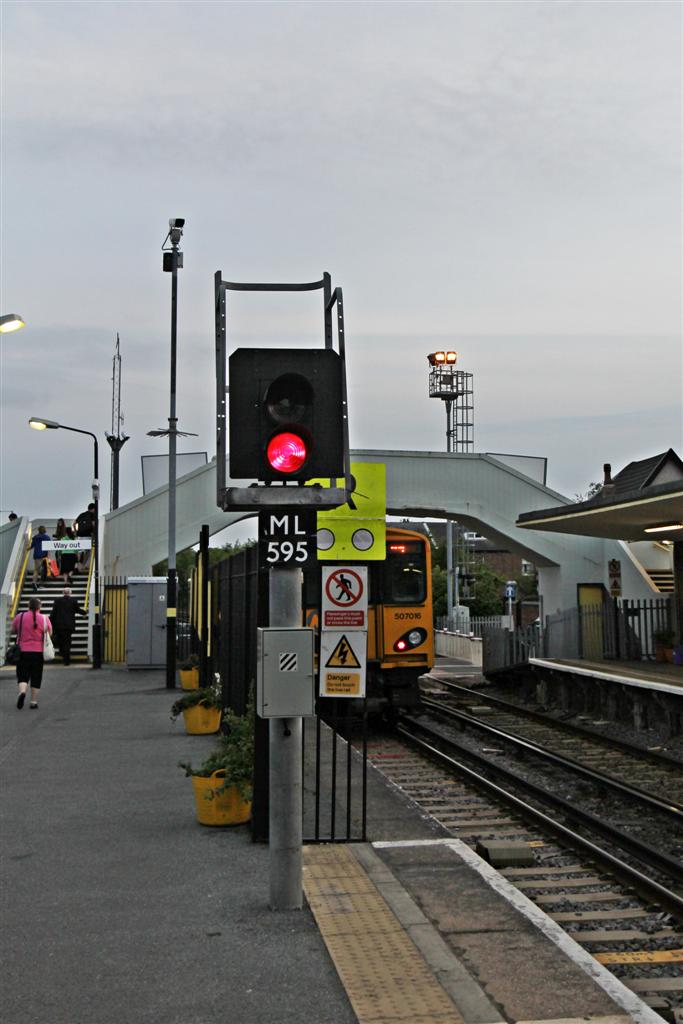
A Merseyrail Class 507 passes a signal, and departs beneath the footbridge, towards West Kirby.

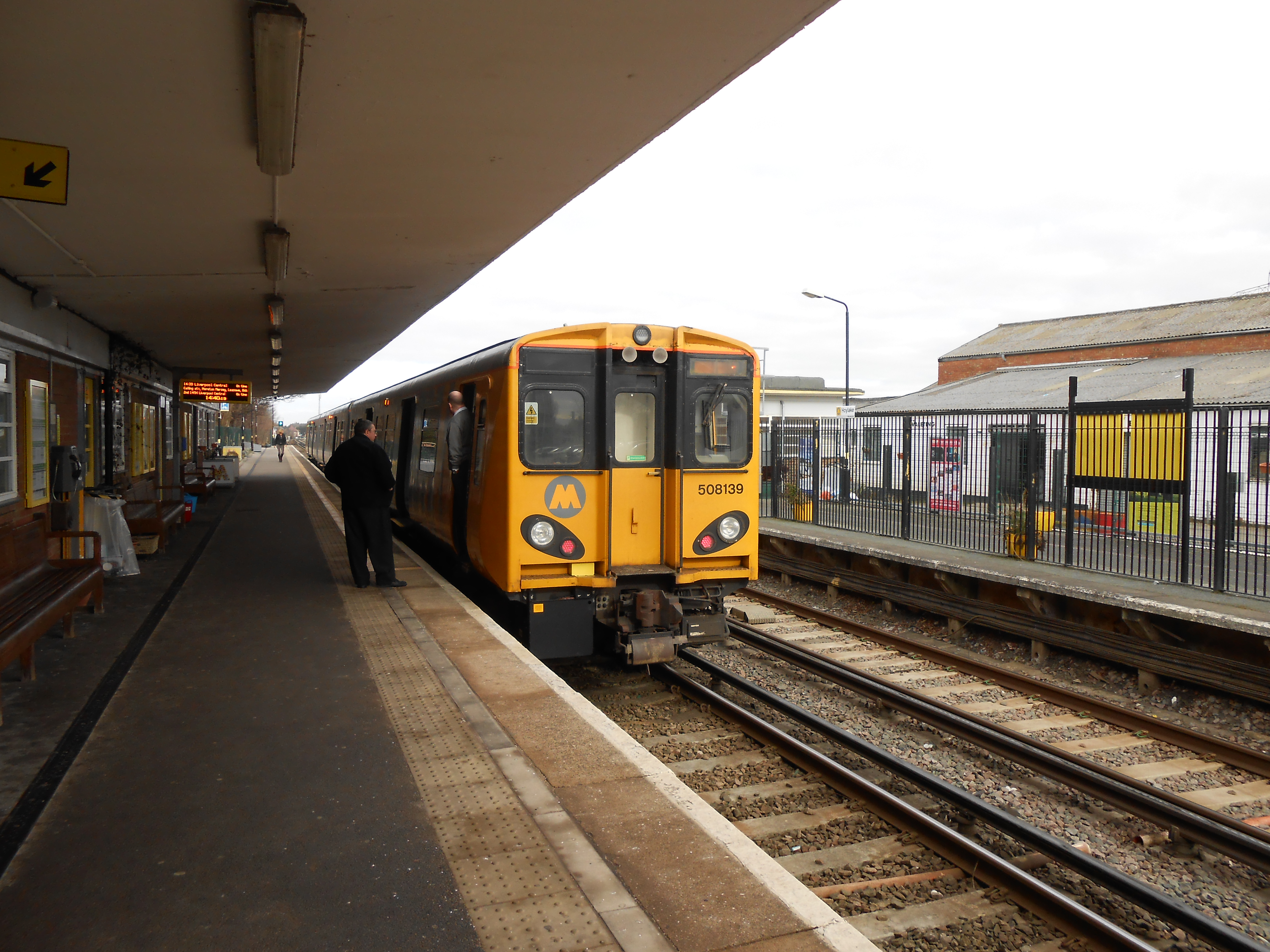
The guard waits to signal the departure of a Liverpool-bound train.

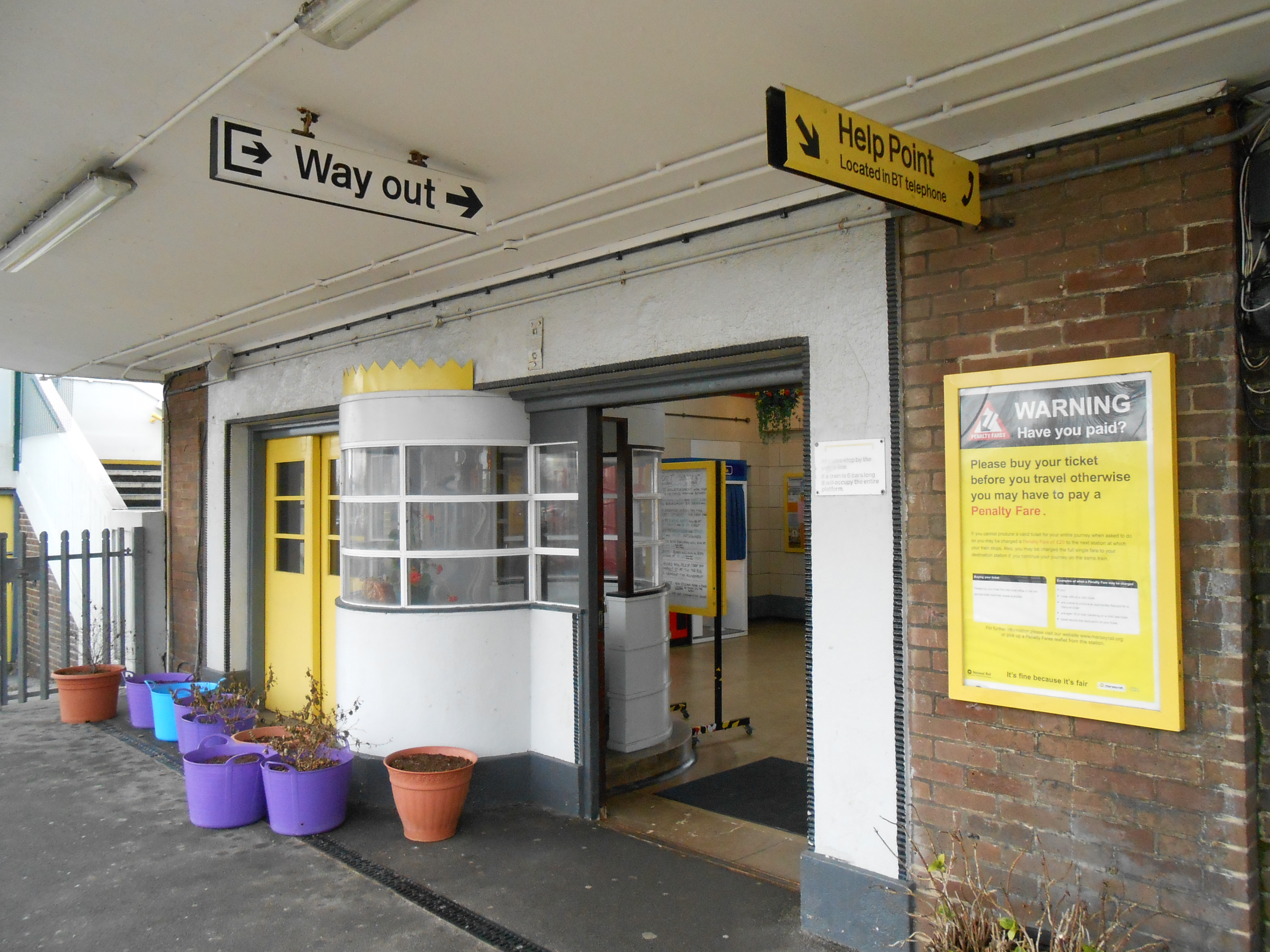
The platform entrance to the booking office.

| Preceding station | National Rail | Following station |
|---|---|---|
| West Kirby; Terminus | Merseyrail; Wirral Line; West Kirby Branch | Manor Road towards Liverpool Central |
