= Hoylake Parade Community Centre =

Community building in Wirral, England

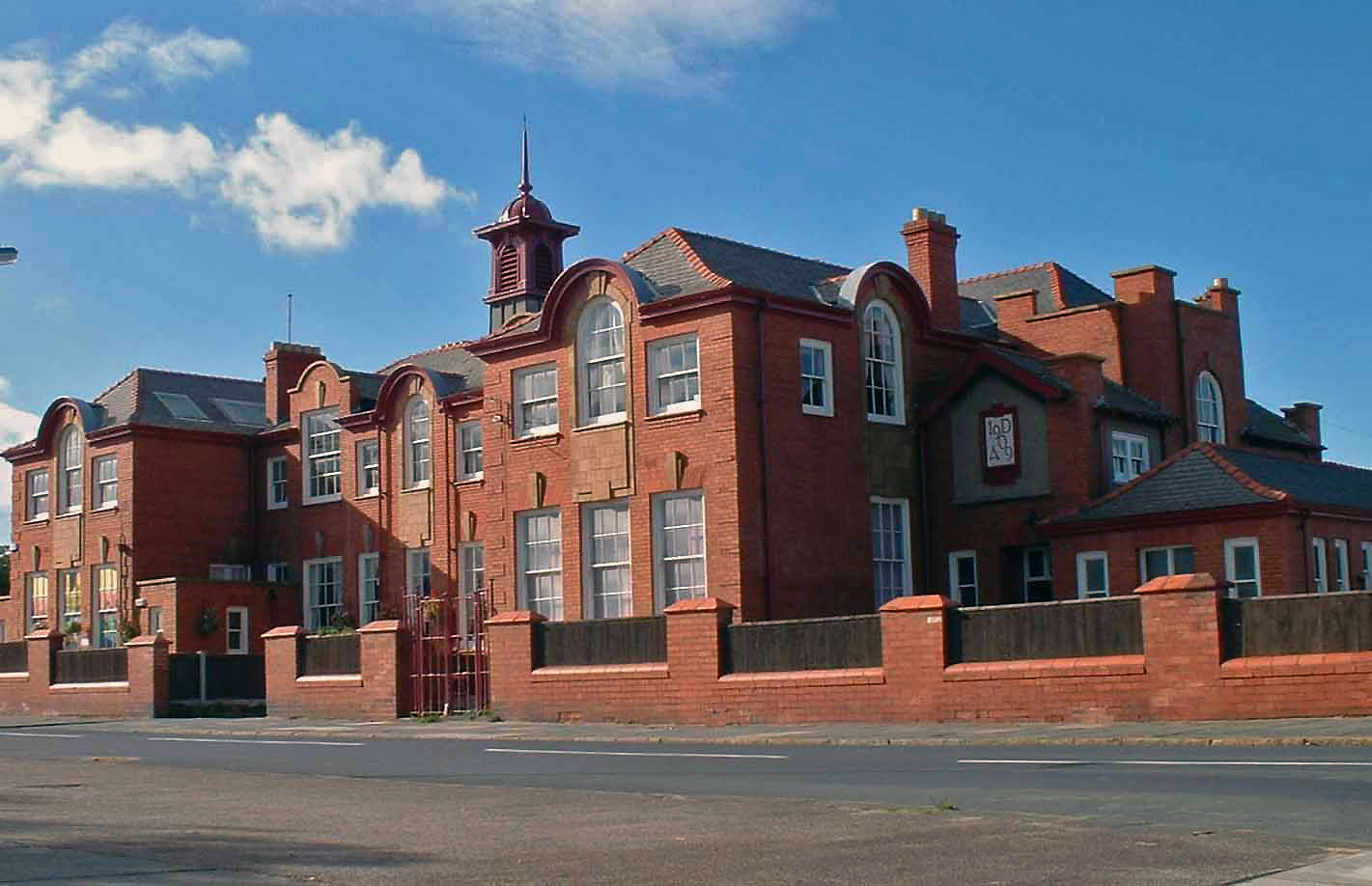
- Interactive map of the Hoylake Parade Community Centre area
- Former names: Hoylake Youth and Community Centre, The Parade School

General information
- Architectural style: Edwardian
- Location: Hoylake, Hoyle Road, Hoylake, Wirral
- Coordinates: 53°23′55″N 3°10′32″W
- Current tenants: Board of Trustees
- Construction started: 1908
- Completed: 1909
- Inaugurated: 1910
- Owner: Wirral Borough Council

Technical details
- Floor count: 2

Hoylake Parade Community Centre is a multi-purpose public building located in Hoylake, Wirral, which serves as a community centre for the local area.

== History as a school ==
The parade centre was built in 1909, as The Parade Higher Elementary School which opened 1910, with 89 pupils on roll, each paying fees of 6d per week. Pupils were admitted selectively by entrance examination from the age of 12.

In 1939, the Second World War led to the evacuation of nearby Liverpool led to 230 evacuees being admitted temporarily to the school.

With the opening of the co-educational Hilbre School in nearby Newton, the school became an annex of the new school in 1973, which it remained until it was ultimately deemed surplus to educational requirements as a school in 1984.

== Subsequent history ==
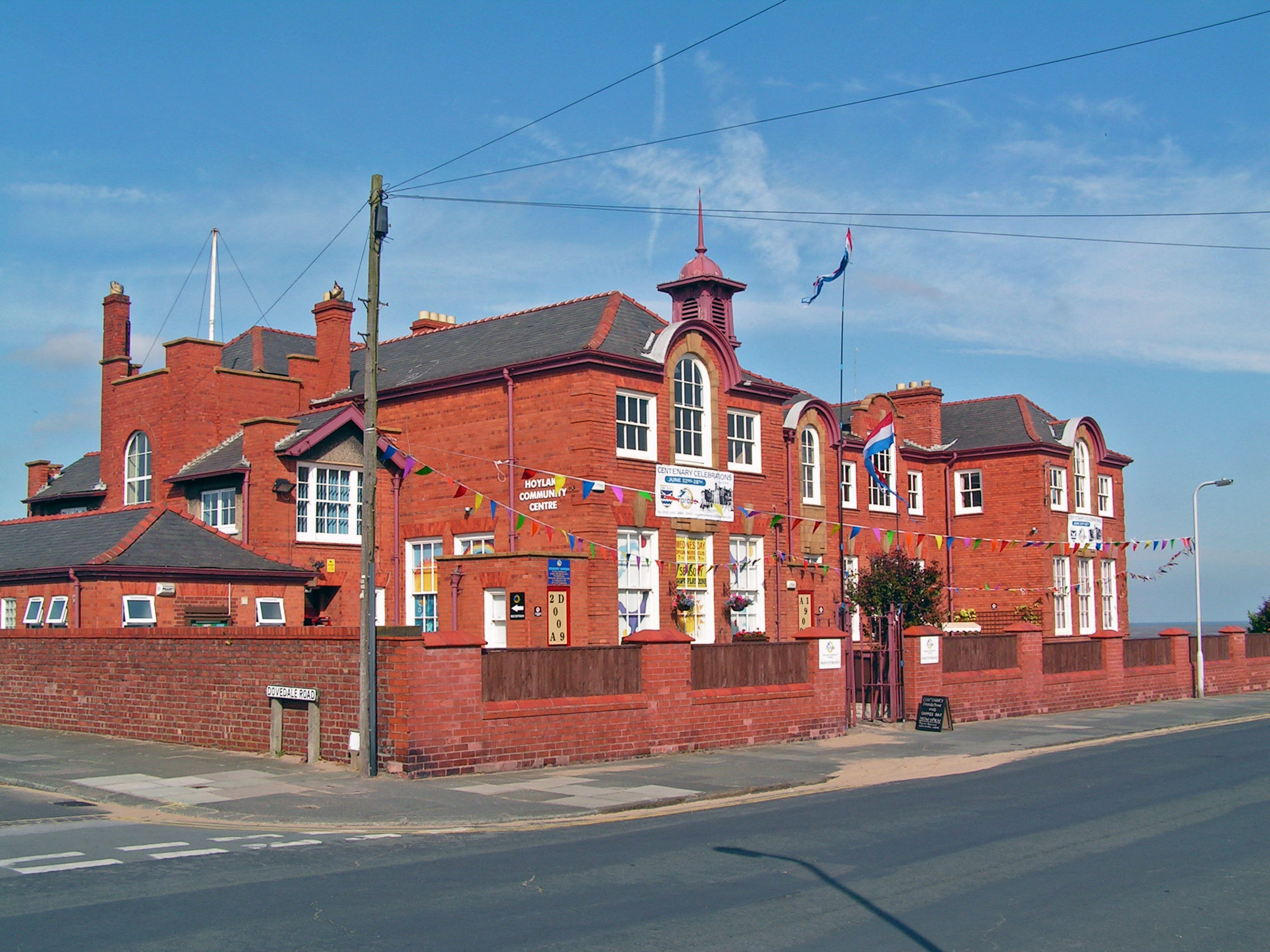
Decorations for the building's 100th anniversary celebrations

Following its closure as a school, the building was used for a variety of community purposes, including accommodating a youth club and evening classes on the site. By the end of the 1980s however, the building was earmarked by the local council for closure and demolition, though this decision was overturned following a community campaign.

An extensive redevelopment of the facility has been undertaken in recent years, with refurbishment of most of the building's rooms and interior spaces.

In 2009, the building celebrated its centenary with a number of public events.

== Current usage ==
The building accommodates a number of artistic, theatrical and sporting groups, including Wirral Sand Yacht Club.

The sensory soft play resource provides a facility for local special needs groups and individuals. The centre also hosts a number of educational and local interest sessions.

Hoylake Film Club screens films on the last Friday of each month in the main hall. Tickets pay for the cost to licence the film to show it in public and all profits are fed back into the community centre.

As part of the centenary celebrations, a previously disused room was restored to recreate a schoolroom setting in the original style of the building, which is now used by school groups as an educational resource.

The building is designated as part of the Hoylake conservation area.

== Facilities ==
The building provides a variety of rooms available for hire, from small and medium-sized meeting rooms to the larger mini hall and the main hall, which can seat up to 100. Rooms are named after local towns and villages, for example, the Caldy room, the West Kirby room and the Heswall room.

The centre includes a cafe, Popsy's, which is open from Monday to Sunday (10am-4pm). Free wireless internet is within the building.

The entire building is wheelchair accessible throughout, via access ramps and automatic doors. In October 2016 after a four-year fundraising campaign, £130,000 was raised allowing the installation of a lift to the building which allows full disabled access to the first floor.

Also on the site is Sanderlings Day Nursery and Wirral Sand Yacht Club, comprising a yacht storage area, club room/workshop, toilets and shower, available for Sand Yacht club members' use.
