= Hoylake =

Seaside town and home of the Royal Liverpool golf club, in Wirral, England

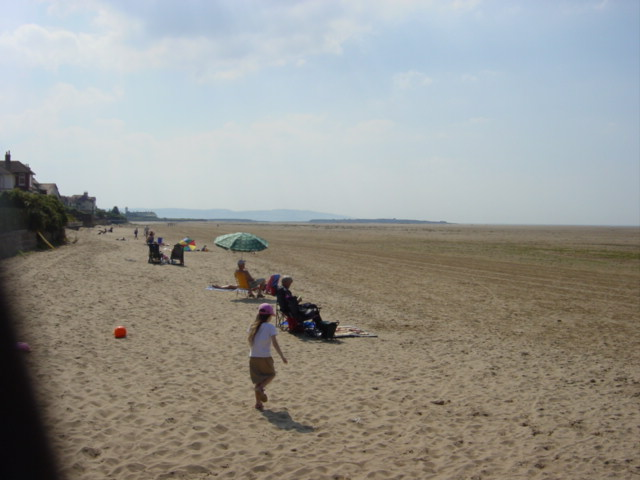
- Hoylake beach, looking towards Hilbre Island

- Location within Merseyside
- Population: 5,315 (Built up area, 2021)
- OS grid reference: SJ215888
  - London: 183 mi (295 km) SE
- Metropolitan borough: Wirral
- Metropolitan county: Merseyside
- Region: North West
- Country: England
- Sovereign state: United Kingdom
- Post town: WIRRAL
- Postcode district: CH47, CH48
- Dialling code: 0151
- ISO 3166 code: GB-WRL
- Police: Merseyside
- Fire: Merseyside
- Ambulance: North West
- UK Parliament: Wirral West

Hoylake (/hɔɪˈleɪk/) is a seaside town in the Metropolitan Borough of Wirral, Merseyside, England. It is at the north west of the Wirral Peninsula, near West Kirby and where the River Dee meets the Irish Sea. At the 2021 census, the built up area had a population of 5,315.

In the nineteenth century, the town grew up around the small fishing village of Hoose (lit. 'hollows'), a settlement that was recorded in the Domesday Book of 1086 within the Hundred of 'Wilaveston' (historically part of Cheshire). The town takes its name from 'Hoyle Lake', a nearby channel of water out towards Hilbre Island that provided a safe anchorage for shipping.

== History ==
In 1690, William III set sail from Hoylake, then known as Hyle or High-lake, (Note: High lake is also mentioned, with regard to William III's army travelling to Ireland, in the BBC programme Who Do You Think You Are?, Series 12, Episode 3, about Derek Jacobi.) with a 10,000-strong army to Ireland, where his army was to take part in the Battle of the Boyne. The location of departure remains known as King's Gap. The previous year a large force under Marshal Schomberg had also departed from Hoylake on 12 August, crossing to Ireland to capture Carrickfergus.

The present-day township grew up in the nineteenth century around the small fishing village of Hoose, the name of which means "hollows". The 1848 Topographical Dictionary of England described the inhabitants of Hoose as:

"...principally boatmen and fishermen, who have frequently evinced the greatest courage and alacrity in rescuing mariners from the horrors of shipwreck; large banks of sand, extending for miles on the northwest, being annually the scene of most fatal disasters to shipping."

The name Hoylake was derived from Hoyle Lake, a channel of water between Hilbre Island and Dove Point. Protected by a wide sandbank known as Hoyle Bank and with a water depth of about 20 feet, it provided a safe anchorage for ships too large to sail up the Dee to Chester.

== Landmarks ==
The Hoylake and West Kirby War Memorial is a notable local landmark, as it was designed in 1922 by the British sculptor Charles Sargeant Jagger who was responsible for a number of war memorials around the world, including the Royal Artillery Memorial at Hyde Park Corner in London.

The former Hoylake Town Hall, on the corner of Albert Road and Market Street, is due to be converted to a new arts centre, known as The Beacon, with craft workshops, restaurant, and flats above.

Kings Gap roundabout is home to a sculpture by Scottish sculptor David Annand. Called 'Knots', it consists of seabirds looping around four poles. It was commissioned by the council as part of the regeneration of Hoylake and was installed in June 2006 in time for the 2006 Open Championship.

=== Lighthouses ===
Hoylake Lighthouse High
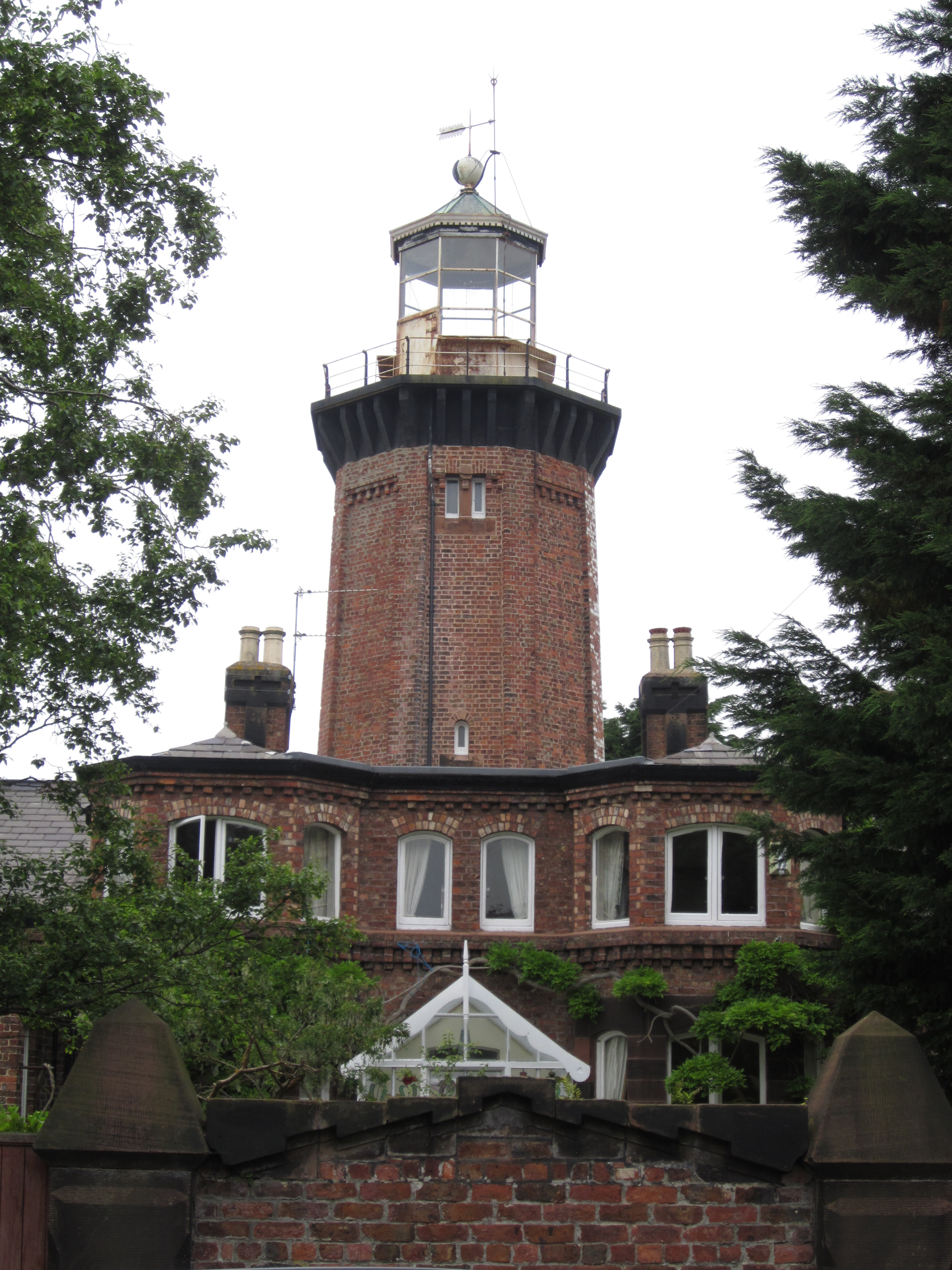
- The old upper lighthouse
- Location: Hoylake; Merseyside; England
- OS grid: SJ2146289004
- Coordinates: 53.392089°N 3.182614°W

Tower
- Constructed: 1764 (first)
- Construction: brick tower
- Height: 17 metres (56 ft)
- Shape: octagonal prism tower with balcony and lantern attached to 2-storey keeper's house
- Markings: unpainted tower, black balcony, white lantern
- Operator: private
- Heritage: Grade II listed building

Light
- First lit: 1865 (current)
- Deactivated: 1886
- Lens: 4th order fixed optic (azimuthal condensing)

To facilitate safe access into the Hoylake anchorage, two lighthouses were constructed in 1763, at the initiative of William Hutchinson. The lower light was a wooden structure that could be moved according to differing tides and shifting sands to remain aligned to the upper light, which was a permanent brick building. By the start of the 19th century each lighthouse was equipped with a single 3 ft-diameter reflector, built to Hutchinson's design.

Both of these structures were rebuilt a century later, and in 1865 new lenses (a pair of fourth-order fixed optics) were designed and manufactured for the two towers by James Chance. The upper lighthouse, consisting of an octagonal brick tower, last shone on 14 May 1886 and is now part of a private residence in Valentia Road. The building was given Grade II listed status in 1988. The lower lighthouse, closer to the shore in Alderley Road, was deactivated in 1908 and demolished in 1922.

=== Former landmarks ===
The Royal Hotel was built by Sir John Stanley in 1792, with the intention of developing the area as a holiday resort. The numerous steam packet vessels sailing between Liverpool and North Wales which called at the hotel provided valuable patronage. By the mid-19th century a racecourse was laid out in the grounds of the hotel. The hotel building was demolished in the 1950s.

Hoylake's lido, located on the promenade, was opened in June 1913 and rebuilt in the late 1920s. In 1976, the Hoylake Pool and Community Trust took over the running of the facility from Wirral Borough Council. The baths finally closed in 1981.

== Geography ==
Hoylake is at the north-western corner of the Wirral Peninsula, and is situated on the eastern side of the mouth of the Dee Estuary and adjacent to the Irish Sea. Hoylake is approximately 11 km (6.8 mi) west-south-west of the River Mersey at New Brighton. The centre of Hoylake is situated at an elevation of about 9 m (30 ft) above sea level.

To the west of the town at Hilbre Point is Red Rocks, a designated Site of Special Scientific Interest. The area is an exposed sandstone outcrop consisting of sand dunes, brackish marsh and reed beds.

== Governance ==
There is one main tier of local government covering Hoylake, at metropolitan borough level: Wirral Council. The council is a member of the Liverpool City Region Combined Authority, which is led by the directly-elected Mayor of the Liverpool City Region. The town forms part of the Hoylake and Meols ward for elections to Wirral Council.

For national elections, Hoylake is within the parliamentary constituency of Wirral West. The current Member of Parliament is Matthew Patrick, of the Labour Party.

=== Administrative history ===
Hoylake grew up straddling the townships of Hoose and Little Meols, which both formed part of the ancient parish of West Kirby in the Wirral Hundred of Cheshire. From the 17th century onwards, parishes were gradually given various civil functions under the poor laws, in addition to their original ecclesiastical functions. In some cases, including West Kirby, the civil functions were exercised by each township separately rather than the parish as a whole. In 1866, the legal definition of 'parish' was changed to be the areas used for administering the poor laws, and so Hoose and Little Meols also became civil parishes.

The population of the Hoose township or civil parish was recorded as 60 in 1801, 589 in 1851, and 1,658 in 1891.

A local government district was created in 1891, covering the townships or civil parishes of Great Meols, Hoose, Little Meols, West Kirby and part of Grange. There was a dispute about whether the district's name should be 'Hoylake and West Kirby' or 'West Kirby and Hoylake'; the county council chose the latter.

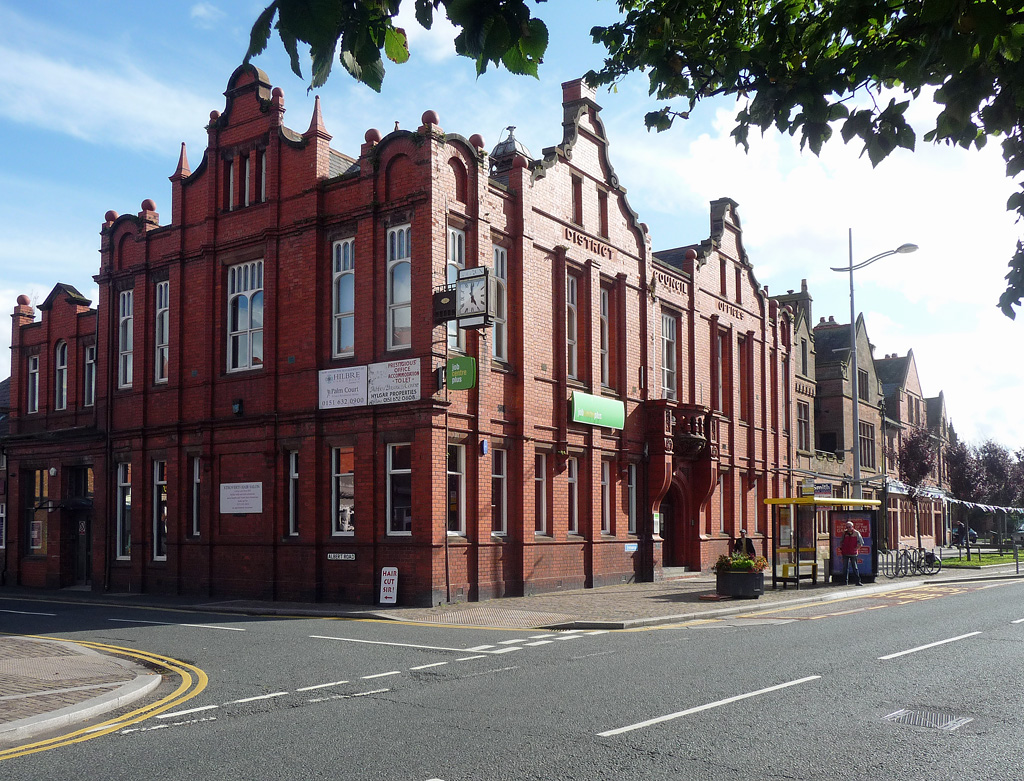
Hoylake Town Hall

Such districts were reconstituted as urban districts under the Local Government Act 1894. At the same time, the civil parishes within the district were united into a single civil parish called Hoylake-cum-West Kirby. Although the order creating the district in 1891 had put the name West Kirby first, the council took to calling the district Hoylake and West Kirby. To resolve the ambiguity, the government formally confirmed the district's name as being Hoylake and West Kirby in 1897. The council chose to base itself in Hoylake, building Hoylake Town Hall on Market Street in 1898.

The urban district was enlarged in 1933 to take in the civil parishes of Caldy, Frankby, Grange, (Note: Grange was enlarged at the same time to take in the western parts of the abolished parish of Saughall Massie, not including the village.) and Greasby. The urban district was renamed Hoylake at the same time. The urban district council was granted a coat of arms in 1960, which featured two golf clubs, representing the Royal Liverpool Golf Club.

Hoylake Urban District was abolished in 1974 under the Local Government Act 1972. The area became part of the Metropolitan Borough of Wirral in the new county of Merseyside.

== Community ==
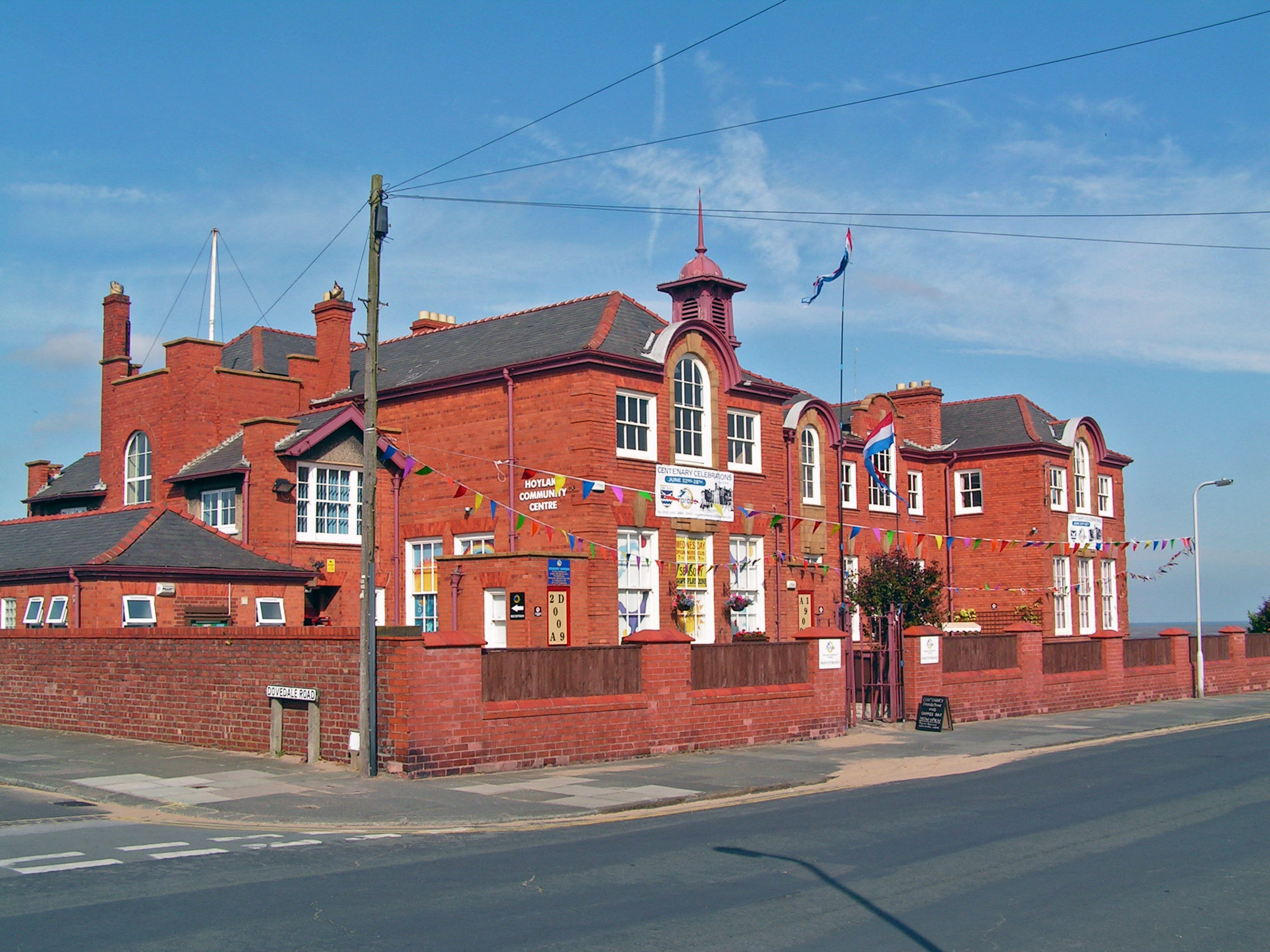
Hoylake Community Centre

Hoylake is a largely residential area and there is an active nightlife in the town centre, which is located at the original village of Hoose.

The town supports a permanent lifeboat station, manned by the RNLI. Initially founded in 1803 by the Mersey Docks and Harbour Board, it is one of the oldest in the country. In 2008, the RNLI began to raise £2 million for a new lifeboat station and new generation all-weather lifeboat, to facilitate a faster response time to emergencies and rescues in the Irish Sea and the rivers Dee and Mersey. The building was opened in November 2009.

The Kings Gap conservation area has been designated by Wirral Borough Council. Bounded by the coastline and the Royal Liverpool Golf Club, it consists of large nineteenth and early twentieth century houses, Hoylake Lighthouse and St Hildeburgh's Church.

== Education ==
Hoylake includes the independent Kingsmead School, which educates girls and boys from 2 to 16 years old. Hoylake Holy Trinity C of E Primary School is the town's main primary school, educating children from the ages of 3 to 11.

== Media ==
Local news and television programmes are provided by BBC North West and ITV Granada, the local television station TalkLiverpool also broadcasts to the area. Television signals are received from the Winter Hill TV transmitter. With its close proximity with North Wales, BBC Wales and ITV Cymru Wales can also be received from the Moel-y-Parc TV transmitter.

Local radio stations are BBC Radio Merseyside, Heart North West, Capital North West & Wales, Smooth North West, Greatest Hits Radio Liverpool & The North West and Wirral Wave Radio, a community based station.

The town is served by the local newspapers, Wirral Globe and Liverpool Echo.

== Sport ==
=== Golf ===
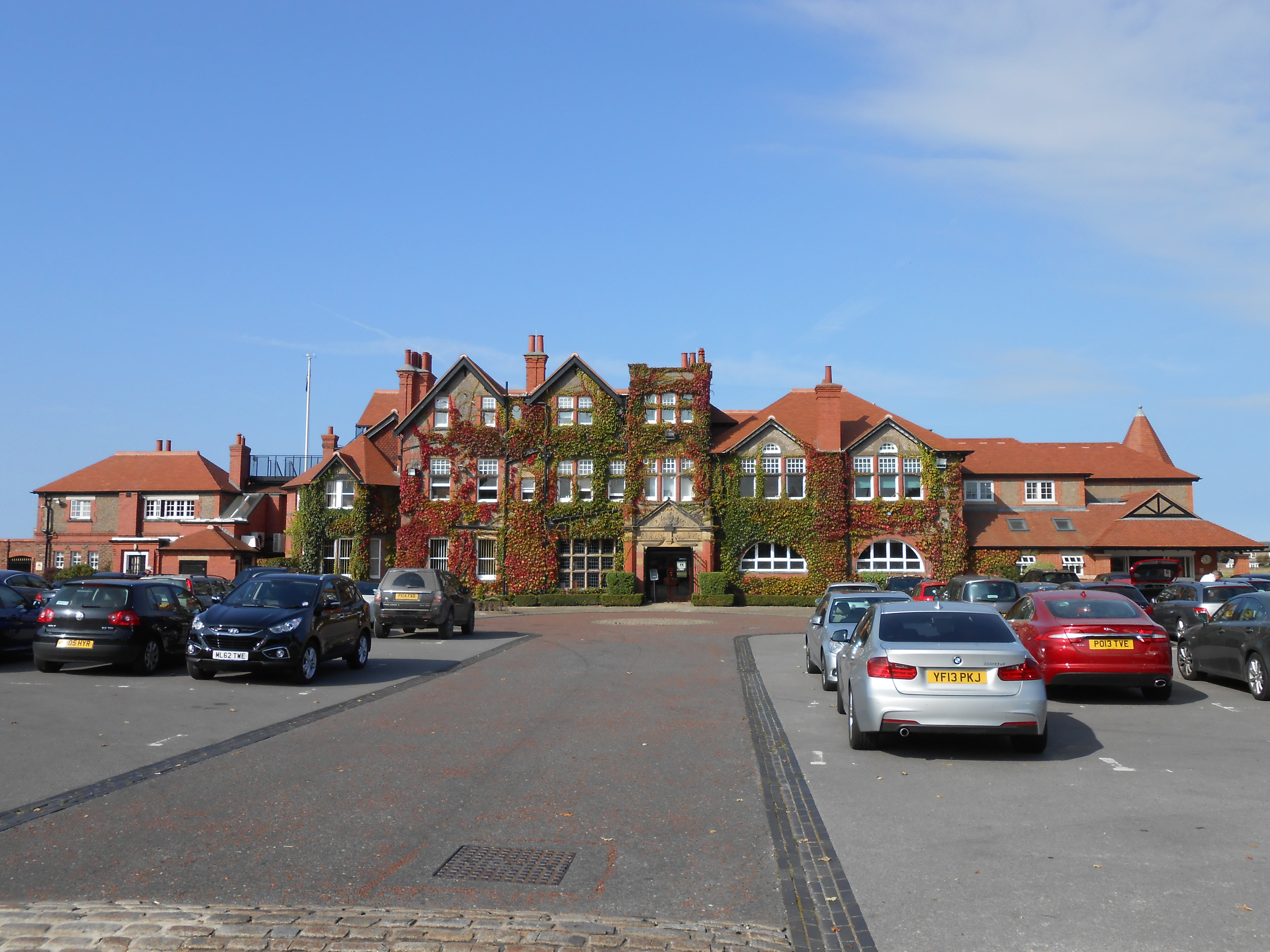
The Royal Liverpool Golf Club

Hoylake is the home of the Royal Liverpool Golf Club, built in 1869 on the site of the Royal Hotel racecourse. It is the second oldest golf links in England, predated only by the Royal North Devon Golf Club, in Westward Ho!, Devon. It has hosted many major tournaments such as the Open Championship and the Walker Cup. The club is often referred to as "Hoylake". It hosted the Open again in July 2006, after a gap of almost 40 years, with Tiger Woods earning the Claret Jug for the second year in a row. The 2014 Open Championship is the 12th time the event was held at Hoylake. This was won by Rory McIlroy. The 2023 Open Championship is the most recent event to be held in Hoylake marking the 13th time it has returned to the town. This was won by Brian Harman.

Hoylake-born amateur golfer John Ball Jnr. won the Open in 1890, becoming the first Englishman to do so. Another local amateur, Harold Hilton became Open champion two years later. He won again in 1897 at his home club of Royal Liverpool.

On the other side of Meols Drive and the railway is Hoylake Municipal Golf course which is used by Hoylake Golf Club (since 1933), West Hoyle GC and Irby GC. It was used as the 2006 Open Championship practice course.

=== Rugby Union ===
Hoylake RFC rugby club was founded in 1922. They currently play in Counties 3 ADM Lancashire & Cheshire league, the ninth tier of English rugby. Its predecessor, connected with the Royal Liverpool Golf Club, had been founded in the 1890s. British Open golf champion Harold Hilton was also captain of the rugby team for the 1890–91 season.

=== Swimming ===
Hoylake ASC was founded in 1931. The club now trains at the West Kirby Concourse and the Calday Grange Swimming Pool.

=== Sailing ===
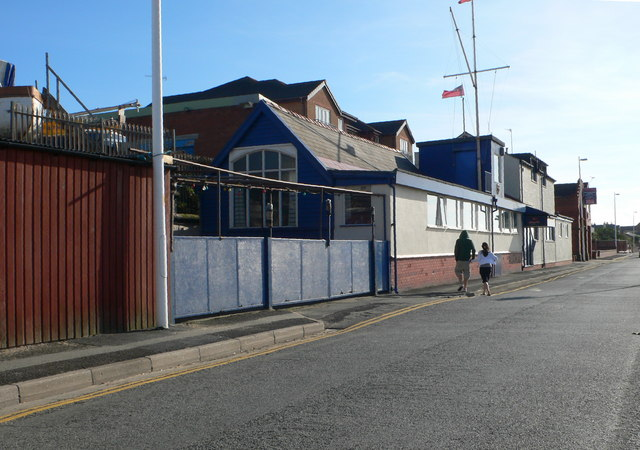
The sailing club on North Parade

Hoylake Sailing Club was founded in 1887 and has a clubhouse and boatyard on North Parade. The club hosts an annual regatta and sends a team to the Southport 24 Hour Race.

=== Sand yachting ===
Hoylake is one of the premier sites for sand yachting in Britain, with banks around a quarter of a mile offshore. The town's beach was the venue for the European Sand Yacht Championships in 2007, 2011, 2017 (with Laytown & Bettystown, County Meath) and 2025.

=== Cricket ===
Cricket was played at the now disused Ellerman Lines Cricket Ground from as early as the 1920s, when the then newly formed West Wirral Cricket Club played at the ground. It was later sold to Ellerman Lines, who transformed the site into their social club. Cheshire played minor counties cricket there from 1957 to 1968. The ground also held Cheshire's first ever appearance in List A cricket against Surrey in the first round of the 1964 Gillette Cup.

The ground was later sold, with the site becoming a nightclub, before being demolished following a fire. In 2011 the site of the ground was selected for construction of 62 affordable homes. Planning permission for this, and a revised plan for 26 properties, were refused. In 2020 a further planning proposal was submitted for 30 semi-detached bungalows and up to 61 assisted living retirement apartments.

== Transport ==
Hoylake and Manor Road railway stations serve the town. Both are on the West Kirby branch of Merseyrail's Wirral line.

== Notable people ==
- Joshua Armitage, pen-name "Ionicus" (1913–1998), the "Punch" artist and designer of covers for Penguin's editions of P.G. Wodehouse. He was born in Hoylake, where he lived and worked all his life.
- John Francis Ashby, English rugby player and member of the 1910 British Lions tour to Argentina, became Holylake councillor in 1911
- Julian Budden, Italian opera scholar and BBC radio producer (1924–2007), born in Hoylake
- The former Olympic Games cyclist Chris Boardman (1968–), born in Hoylake
- Milo Callaghan (born c. 1998/1999), actor, grew up in Hoylake
- Author Jane Campbell (writer) (1942–), born in Hoylake
- Pianist Stephen Coombs (1960–), grew up in Hoylake
- James Bond actor Daniel Craig (1968–), grew up in Hoylake
- Lieutenant Colonel Jack Armand Cunningham (1890–1966), the World War I flying ace. He retired to Hoylake and eventually died there.
- Author Helen Forrester (1919–2011), born in the town
- The former actress and Labour MP Glenda Jackson (1936–2023), grew up in Hoylake
- John Lennon's first wife Cynthia (1939–2015). She grew up in Hoylake and returned there after their divorce in 1968. Their son Julian (1963–) spent much of his early life in Hoylake.
- Eric Morecambe, comedian. He won a local amateur talent contest, held at Hoylake's Kingsway Cinema in 1940.
- Mike Rutherford (1950–) of Genesis. He was a boarder at the Leas School, formerly on Meols Drive.
- Curtis Warren (1963–), Merseyside gangster, formerly featured in the Sunday Times Rich List. He owned a house on Meols Drive.
- Cliff Williams (1949–), bassist of AC/DC, grew up in Hoylake.
- Indie rock bands The Rascals and The Little Flames. They are from Hoylake.
- James Skelly, Ian Skelly, Bill Ryder-Jones, Nick Power, Lee Southall, Paul Duffy and John Duffy, from the band The Coral. They were also brought up there.

== See also ==
- Listed buildings in Hoylake
- Hoylake Holy Trinity C of E Primary School
- Hoylake Holy Trinity Church
- Hoylake Parade Community Centre
