= Jane Cannon Campbell =

- Born: 1 January 1743; County Antrim, Ireland
- Died: 23 February 1836; Cherry Valley, Otsego County, New York
- Resting place: Cherry Valley Cemetery

Jane Cannon Campbell (1 January 1743 - 1836) was an American Revolutionary War Patriot from Cherry Valley, New York.

== Biography ==
Campbell was born in County Antrim, Ireland. At the age of 10 she and her family left Ireland and settled in an area now part of the state of Delaware. The family farmed there for approximately 10 years before moving to an area near Cherry Valley, New York State. In 1767 she married Colonel Samuel Campbell.

Campbell was captured by the combined forces of British Captain Walter Bulter and the Mohawk Chief Joseph Brand during the Cherry Valley Massacre of November 11, 1778. She was held captive with her father, Matthew Cannon and four children first in the Seneca nation capital Kanadaseago, followed by over a year at Fort Niagara before being sent to Montreal for a prisoner exchange.
