= Jane Campbell (writer) =

British writer

Jane Campbell (born 1942 in Hoylake) is a British writer. Her first work is the short story collection Cat Brushing, published in 2022, which the New York Times compared to the work of Edna O'Brien and Muriel Spark. Her debut novel Interpretations of Love was published in the summer of 2024.

== Life ==
Jane Campbell was born in Hoylake near Liverpool and spent the first four years of her life growing up with her great-grandmother and mother. Her father was a prisoner of war in Austria during the Second World War and returned to England in 1946. As he did not like the newly introduced state health system (National Health Service), he decided to emigrate to Africa with his family. Campbell spent her childhood in Northern Rhodesia, now Zambia, where her father worked as a doctor.

She showed a passion for writing from a young age and began writing poems and stories at the age of eight. After returning to England, she studied English and English literature at Oxford University.

Campbell then spent fifteen years living with her British husband in Bermuda, where she took correspondence courses in psychology at the University of Toronto. After her divorce in her late 30s, she returned to Oxford. She completed a master's degree in Applied Social Sciences and trained as a group analyst. She worked as a therapist in her practice in Oxford for almost forty years of her life. Jane Campbell is the mother of four children.

== Literary work ==
At the age of 75, Jane Campbell published her first short story "Cat Brushing", which appeared in the renowned London Review of Books. The editor Mary-Kay Wilmers received it enthusiastically and encouraged Campbell to continue writing. Twelve more stories followed, most with a sexual undertone, reflecting the decades Campbell had spent as a psychoanalyst listening to people talk openly about "all sorts of things". Her short story collection was published in England in 2022 under the title Cat Brushing. It was an excellent, groundbreaking collection, wrote a New York Times reviewer, and deserved comparison with the work of Edna O'Brien or Muriel Spark, while an eerie streak running through several of the stories brought Daphne du Maurier to mind. This was followed in 2024 by her debut novel, originally titled Interpretations of Love.

Everything she has done with her life has been relatively superficial, she said in an interview with Alard von Kittlitz in Zeit magazine. "My most important self was always a writer." Campbell told an interviewer from the Telegraph, "I would hate it to be thought that [Cat Brushing] is a miracle because it was written by a 77-year-old woman as opposed to because it's brilliant prose and interesting stories and amazing characters."

=== Cat Brushing ===
In thirteen stories, Jane Campbell tells of the lives of "old women" in different constellations. The first-person narrators deal with their respective life situations, in particular with the way they themselves deal with old age and the situations associated with it. In a review, the Washington Post described how Campbell dispels the common cliché that older women are weak or powerless: "Campbell, an octogenarian herself, gives life to 13 women in stories centering on their passions, libidos and sense of self. Denying that invisibility arrives with wrinkles, these women experience a range of emotion — joy, heartbreak, trauma, regret and satisfaction — while living the lives they want on their own terms."

=== Interpretations of Love ===
In the novel Interpretations of Love, several characters take center stage and a secret letter that could not be delivered for more than 50 years plays a central role. During the heavy bombing of Liverpool, an affair develops between Sophy, an ambulance driver, and a paramedic. The plot follows Sophy, who marries another man after the war and takes the secret of her daughter's paternity to her grave. From then on, her daughter grows up with her grandparents. After Sophy's death, her older brother receives the letter revealing their father's true identity. Fearing the consequences, he keeps this knowledge to himself for decades, but eventually decides to talk about the letter.

== Publications ==
- Cat Brushing. Grove Press, New York 2022, ISBN 978-0-80216-002-7.
- Interpretations of Love. Grove Press, London 2024, ISBN 978-0-80216-288-5.
