= UK railway stations – C =

Station name	Postcode links to map of station at Bing Maps	Station code links to arrivals and departures	Station code links to station information	Reference
Cadoxton	CF64 4TX	CAD	CAD	
Caergwrle	LL12 9DU	CGW	CGW	
Caerphilly	CF83 1HE	CPH	CPH	
Caersws	SY17 5HH	CWS	CWS	
Caldercruix	ML6 7RJ	CAC	CAC	
Caldicot	NP26 4FJ	CDT	CDT	
Caledonian Road and Barnsbury	N7 8XH	CIR	CIR	
Calstock	PL18 9SL	CSK	CSK	
Cam and Dursley	GL11 5DW	CDU	CDU	
Cameron Bridge	KY8 5BP	CBX	CBX	
Camberley	GU15 3RR	CAM	CAM	
Camborne	TR14 7RF	CBN	CBN	
Cambridge Heath	E2 9HA	CBH	CBH	
Cambridge	CB1 2JW	CBG	CBG	
Cambridge North	CB4 0WP	CMB	CMB	
Cambridge South	CB2 0BE	CMS	CMS	
Cambuslang	G72 8AT	CBL	CBL	
Camden Road	NW1 9LY	CMD	CMD	
Camelon	FK2 7YP	CMO	CMO	
Canada Water	SE16 6QE	ZCW	ZCW	
Canary Wharf	E14 5AB	CWX	CWX	
Canley	CV5 6RA	CNL	CNL	
Cannock	WS11 8NQ	CAO	CAO	
Canonbury	N1 2PG	CNN	CNN	
Canterbury East	CT1 2RB	CBE	CBE	
Canterbury West	CT2 7ER	CBW	CBW	
Cantley	NR13 3SP	CNY	CNY	
Capenhurst	CH1 6ER	CPU	CPU	
Carbis Bay	TR26 2LN	CBB	CBB	
Cardenden	KY5 0BS	CDD	CDD	
Cardiff Bay	CF10 5LE	CDB	CDB	
Cardiff Central	CF10 1RH	CDF	CDF	
Cardiff Queen Street	CF10 2FY	CDQ	CDQ	
Cardonald	G52 2DA	CDO	CDO	
Cardross	G82 5NL	CDR	CDR	
Carfin	ML1 5AX	CRF	CRF	
Cark & Cartmel	LA11 7PT	CAK	CAK	
Carlisle	CA2 5AF	CAR	CAR	
Carlton	NG4 2FD	CTO	CTO	
Carluke	ML8 5DF	CLU	CLU	
Carmarthen	SA31 2BG	CMN	CMN	
Carmyle	G32 8JU	CML	CML	
Carnalea	BT19 1EZ			
Carnforth	LA5 9ET	CNF	CNF	
Carnoustie	DD7 6AR	CAN	CAN	
Carntyne	G32 6AS	CAY	CAY	
Carpenders Park	WD1 6DT	CPK	CPK	
Carrbridge	PH23 3AZ	CAG	CAG	
Carrickfergus	BT38 8AQ			
Carshalton Beeches	SM5 3RF	CSB	CSB	
Carshalton	SM5 2HW	CSH	CSH	
Carstairs	ML11 8PP	CRS	CRS	
Cartsdyke	PA15 2TH	CDY	CDY	
Castle Bar Park	W7 1BA	CBP	CBP	
Castle Cary	BA7 7PE	CLC	CLC	
Castleford	WF10 1DZ	CFD	CFD	
Castlerock	BT51 4RE			
Castleton Moor	YO21 2EZ	CSM	CSM	
Castleton	OL11 3EE	CAS	CAS	
Caterham	CR3 6GR	CAT	CAT	
Catford	SE6 4RH	CTF	CTF	
Catford Bridge	SE6 4PZ	CFB	CFB	
Cathays	CF10 3LU	CYS	CYS	
Cathcart	G44 4ED	CCT	CCT	
Cattal	YO26 8DS	CTL	CTL	
Causeland	PL14 4RW	CAU	CAU	
Cefn-y-Bedd	LL12 9UU	CYB	CYB	
Chadwell Heath	RM8 1TE	CTH	CTH	
Chafford Hundred Lakeside	RM16 6QQ	CFH	CFH	
Chalfont & Latimer	HP7 9PR	CFO	CFO	
Chalkwell	SS0 8PX	CHW	CHW	
Chandler's Ford	SO53 4DE	CFR	CFR	
Chapel-en-le-Frith	SK23 9UJ	CEF	CEF	
Chapelton (Devon)	EX37 9DZ	CPN	CPN	
Chapeltown	S35 2UN	CLN	CLN	
Chappel and Wakes Colne	CO6 2DS	CWC	CWC	
Charing Cross	G2 4PR	CHC	CHC	
Charing	TN27 0HZ	CHG	CHG	
Charlbury	OX7 3HH	CBY	CBY	
Charlton	SE7 7QG	CTN	CTN	
Chartham	CT4 7HU	CRT	CRT	
Chassen Road	M41 9DU	CSR	CSR	
Chatelherault	ML3 7UD	CTE	CTE	
Chatham	ME4 6PN	CTM	CTM	
Chathill	NE67 5DF	CHT	CHT	
Cheadle Hulme	SK8 5AQ	CHU	CHU	
Cheam	SM3 8RZ	CHE	CHE	
Cheddington	LU7 0SQ	CED	CED	
Chelford	SK11 9BU	CEL	CEL	
Chelmsford	CM1 1AS	CHM	CHM	
Chelsfield	BR6 6EU	CLD	CLD	
Cheltenham Spa	GL51 8NP	CNM	CNM	
Chepstow	NP16 5PD	CPW	CPW	
Cherry Tree	BB2 4SH	CYT	CYT	
Chertsey	KT16 9BH	CHY	CHY	
Cheshunt	EN8 9AQ	CHN	CHN	
Chessington North	KT9 1QL	CSN	CSN	
Chessington South	KT9 2JR	CSS	CSS	
Chester	CH1 3AH	CTR	CTR	
Chester Road	B73 5JS	CRD	CRD	
Chester-le-Street	DH2 2DF	CLS	CLS	
Chesterfield	S41 7UB	CHD	CHD	
Chestfield & Swalecliffe	CT5 3JB	CSW	CSW	
Chetnole	DT9 6PJ	CNO	CNO	
Chichester	PO19 2DL	CCH	CCH	
Chilham	CT4 8EG	CIL	CIL	
Chilworth	GU4 8QW	CHL	CHL	
Chingford	E4 6AL	CHI	CHI	
Chinley	SK23 6AZ	CLY	CLY	
Chippenham	SN15 3QE	CPM	CPM	
Chipstead	CR5 3TD	CHP	CHP	
Chirk	LL14 5LU	CRK	CRK	
Chislehurst	BR7 5NR	CIT	CIT	
Chiswick	W4 3HF	CHK	CHK	
Cholsey	OX10 9LN	CHO	CHO	
Chorley	PR6 0RG	CRL	CRL	
Chorleywood	WD3 5ND	CLW	CLW	
Christchurch	BH23 2AB	CHR	CHR	
Christ's Hospital	RH13 7NE	CHH	CHH	
Church and Oswaldtwistle	BB5 0EG	CTW	CTW	
Church Fenton	LS24 9QX	CHF	CHF	
Church Stretton	SY6 6PG	CTT	CTT	
Cilmeri	LD2 3NU	CIM	CIM	
City Hospital	BT9 7AB			
City Thameslink	EC4M 7NR	CTK	CTK	
Clacton-on-Sea	CO15 6PZ	CLT	CLT	
Clandon	GU4 7UB	CLA	CLA	
Clapham High Street	SW4 6DF	CLP	CLP	
Clapham Junction	SW11 2HT	CLJ	CLJ	
Clapham	LA2 8HN	CPY	CPY	
Clapton	E5 9RD	CPT	CPT	
Clarbeston Road	SA63 4UW	CLR	CLR	
Clarkston	G76 7BN	CKS	CKS	
Claverdon	CV35 8PQ	CLV	CLV	
Claygate	KT10 0PB	CLG	CLG	
Cleethorpes	DN35 8AX	CLE	CLE	
Cleland	ML1 5RR	CEA	CEA	
Clifton	M27 8LN	CLI	CLI	
Clifton Down	BS8 2PN	CFN	CFN	
Clipperstown	BT38 8AY			
Clitheroe	BB7 2JG	CLH	CLH	
Clock House	BR3 4PT	CLK	CLK	
Clunderwen	SA66 7NG	CUW	CUW	
Clydebank	G81 1RT	CYK	CYK	
Coatbridge Central	ML5 1QQ	CBC	CBC	
Coatbridge Sunnyside	ML5 3HR	CBS	CBS	
Coatdyke	ML5 3PY	COA	COA	
Cobham & Stoke d'Abernon	KT11 3BT	CSD	CSD	
Codsall	WV8 2EH	CSL	CSL	
Cogan	CF64 2NS	CGN	CGN	
Colchester	CO1 1XD	COL	COL	
Colchester Town	CO2 7EF	CET	CET	
Coleraine	BT52 1PQ			
Coleshill Parkway	B46 1DA	CEH	CEH	
Collingham	NG23 7RB	CLM	CLM	
Collington	TN39 3DQ	CLL	CLL	
Colne	BB8 9NP	CNE	CNE	
Colwall	WR13 6QH	CWL	CWL	
Colwyn Bay	LL29 8DF	CWB	CWB	
Combe	OX8 8ET	CME	CME	
Commondale	YO21 2HN	COM	COM	
Congleton	CW12 3LF	CNG	CNG	
Conisbrough	NG8 2TT	CNS	CNS	
Connel Ferry	PA37 1PB	CON	CON	
Conon Bridge	IV7 8AA	CBD	CBD	
Cononley	BD20 8LS	CEY	CEY	
Conway Park	CH41 3RU	CNP	CNP	
Conwy	LL32 8AF	CNW	CNW	
Cooden Beach	TN39 4TT	COB	COB	
Cookham	SL6 9BP	COO	COO	
Cooksbridge	BN8 4SW	CBR	CBR	
Coombe Junction Halt	PL14 4YH	COE	COE	
Copplestone	EX17 5NF	COP	COP	
Corbridge	NE45 5AZ	CRB	CRB	
Corby	NN17 1UJ	COR	COR	
Corkerhill	G52 1RB	CKH	CKH	
Corkickle	CA28 7TQ	CKL	CKL	
Corpach	PH33 7JH	CPA	CPA	
Corrour	PH30 4AA	CRR	CRR	
Coryton	CF14 7BW	COY	COY	
Coseley	WV14 8XR	CSY	CSY	
Cosford	WV7 3EY	COS	COS	
Cosham	PO6 3BD	CSA	CSA	
Cottingham	HU16 4YA	CGM	CGM	
Cottingley	LS11 0LD	COT	COT	
Coulsdon South	CR5 2HA	CDS	CDS	
Coulsdon Town	CR3 2NS	CDN	CDN	
Coventry	CV3 6HF	COV	COV	
Coventry Arena	CV6 6AS	CAA	CAA	
Cowden	TN8 7DS	CWN	CWN	
Cowdenbeath	KY4 9SG	COW	COW	
Cradley Heath	B64 7AR	CRA	CRA	
Craigendoran	G84 7JE	CGD	CGD	
Cramlington	NE23 1DJ	CRM	CRM	
Cranbrook	EX5 2DY	CBK	CBK	
Craven Arms	SY7 9RL	CRV	CRV	
Crawley	RH10 6AJ	CRW	CRW	
Crayford	DA1 4HW	CRY	CRY	
Crediton	EX17 3BY	CDI	CDI	
Cressing	CM7 8NT	CES	CES	
Cressington	L19 0PQ	CSG	CSG	
Creswell	S80 4JD	CWD	CWD	
Crewe	CW1 6AR	CRE	CRE	
Crewkerne	TA18 8AU	CKN	CKN	
Crews Hill	EN2 9EA	CWH	CWH	
Crianlarich	FK20 8QQ	CNR	CNR	
Criccieth	LL52 0RW	CCC	CCC	
Cricklewood	NW2 1EU	CRI	CRI	
Croftfoot	G73 2AH	CFF	CFF	
Crofton Park	SE4 2PQ	CFT	CFT	
Cromer	NR27 9SW	CMR	CMR	
Cromford	DE4 5JJ	CMF	CMF	
Crookston	G52 3LQ	CKT	CKT	
Cross Gates	LS15 8BX	CRG	CRG	
Crossflatts	BD16 2RZ	CFL	CFL	
Crosshill	G42 8ER	COI	COI	
Crosskeys	NP11 7BU	CKY	CKY	
Crossmyloof	G41 3RY	CMY	CMY	
Croston	PR26 9HL	CSO	CSO	
Crouch Hill	N4 4BW	CRH	CRH	
Crowborough	TN6 2JR	COH	COH	
Crowhurst	TN33 9DE	CWU	CWU	
Crowle	DN17 4JS	CWE	CWE	
Crowthorne	RG45 6NZ	CRN	CRN	
Croy	G68 9AA	CRO	CRO	
Crystal Palace	SE19 2AZ	CYP	CYP	
Cuddington	CW8 2LP	CUD	CUD	
Cuffley	EN6 4HY	CUF	CUF	
Culham	OX14 3BT	CUM	CUM	
Cullybackey	BT42 1BU			
Culrain	IV24 3DW	CUA	CUA	
Cultra	BT18 0EU			
Cumbernauld	G67 2PL	CUB	CUB	
Cupar	KY15 5JD	CUP	CUP	
Curriehill	EH14 5QR	CUH	CUH	
Custom House	E16 1DR	CUS	CUS	
Cuxton	ME2 1AB	CUX	CUX	
Cwmbach	CF44 0AG	CMH	CMH	
Cwmbran	NP44 2JU	CWM	CWM	
Cynghordy	SA20 0LY	CYN	CYN	

== See also ==
- List of heritage railway stations in the United Kingdom
