= GWE =

GWE may refer to:

- Gigawatt electrical (GW_{e})
- Gweno language, native to Tanzania
- Gwersyllt railway station, in Wales
- Gweru-Thornhill Air Base, in Zimbabwe
