= Hope railway station (Wales) =

Railway station in Flintshire, Wales

Hope (Flintshire) Welsh: Yr Hôb
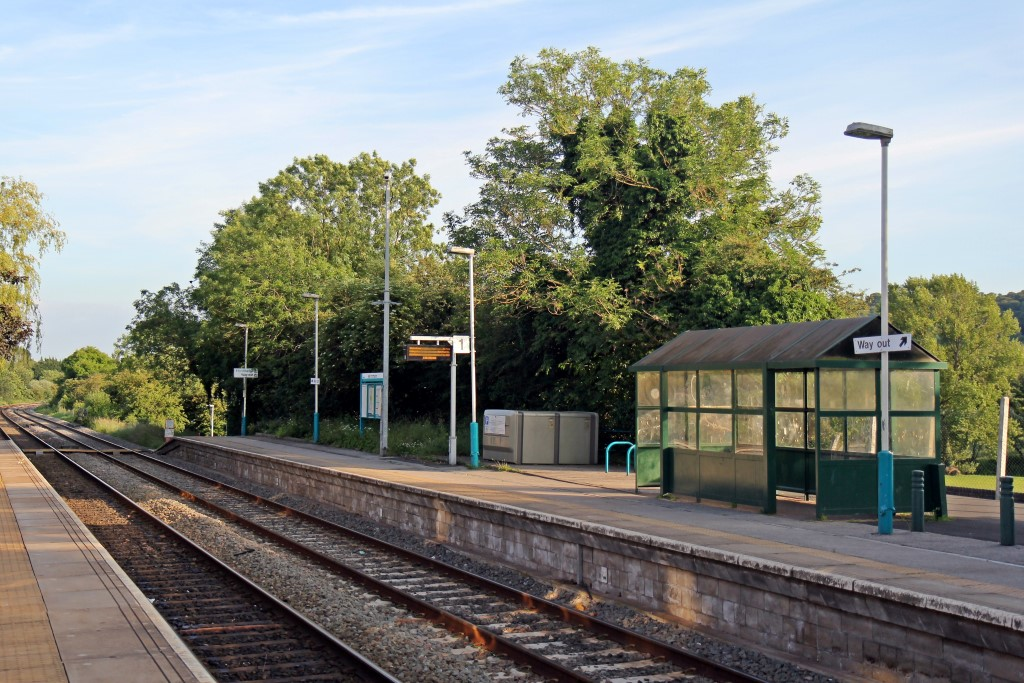

General information
- Location: Hope, Flintshire, Flintshire; Wales
- Coordinates: 53.117°N 3.037°W
- Grid reference: SJ306582
- Manager: Transport for Wales
- Platforms: 2

Other information
- Station code: HPE
- Classification: DfT category F2

Key dates
- 1 May 1866: Opened as Caergwrle
- 1 January 1899: Renamed Hope Village
- 6 May 1974: Renamed Hope (Clwyd)

Passengers
- 2021/22: ▲12,026
- 2022/23: ▲17,604
- 2023/24: ▼15,330
- 2024/25: ▲23,332
- 2025/26: ▲34,026
Location
Notes
- Passenger statistics from the Office of Rail and Road

Hope railway station serves the village of Hope in Flintshire, Wales. The station is 5 1/4 miles (8.4 km) north of Wrexham Central on the Borderlands Line. The name of the station in Welsh is Yr Hôb.

== History ==
The station was originally known as Caergwrle, with the name changing to Hope Village on 1 January 1899, to differentiate it from Caergwrle and Hope Exchange stations, with the latter being just north of Penyffordd. The station had a 17-lever signal box at the northern end of the Wrexham-bound platform, with an adjacent third through line around the outside of the platform, and a goods yard with a cattle pen and one-ton crane. The signal box was opened in 1885 and closed on 1 August 1965, and the goods yard closed on 4 May 1964. The station buildings here have been demolished since the station became unstaffed in 1969.

== Facilities ==
Each of the two platforms has an electronic timetable (CIS screen), timetable poster board, a waiting shelter and CCTV. There is a cycle rack and lock-up on platform 1 and a payphone on platform 2. Entry to the station is by a ramp. Access to each platform is straightforward, with a pedestrian level crossing at the southern end of the platforms. However, neither platform has any seating.

== Services ==
The basic off-peak service consists of one train per hour to Bidston (for connections to Birkenhead Park and Liverpool Lime Street via the Wirral Line), and one to Wrexham Central. In the evenings and on bank holidays, this drops to one every second hour. There is a train every 90 minutes in each direction on Sundays.

Preceding station	National Rail	Following station
Caergwrle	Transport for Wales; Borderlands Line	Penyffordd

== Bibliography ==
- Butt, R.V.J. (1995). The Directory of Railway Stations. Yeovil: Patrick Stephens Ltd. ISBN 1-85260-508-1. R508.
- Mitchell, Vic; Smith, Keith (2013). Wrexham to New Brighton. West Sussex: Middleton Press. ISBN 9781908174475. OCLC 859543196.
