= Penyffordd railway station =

Railway station in Flintshire, Wales

Penyffordd
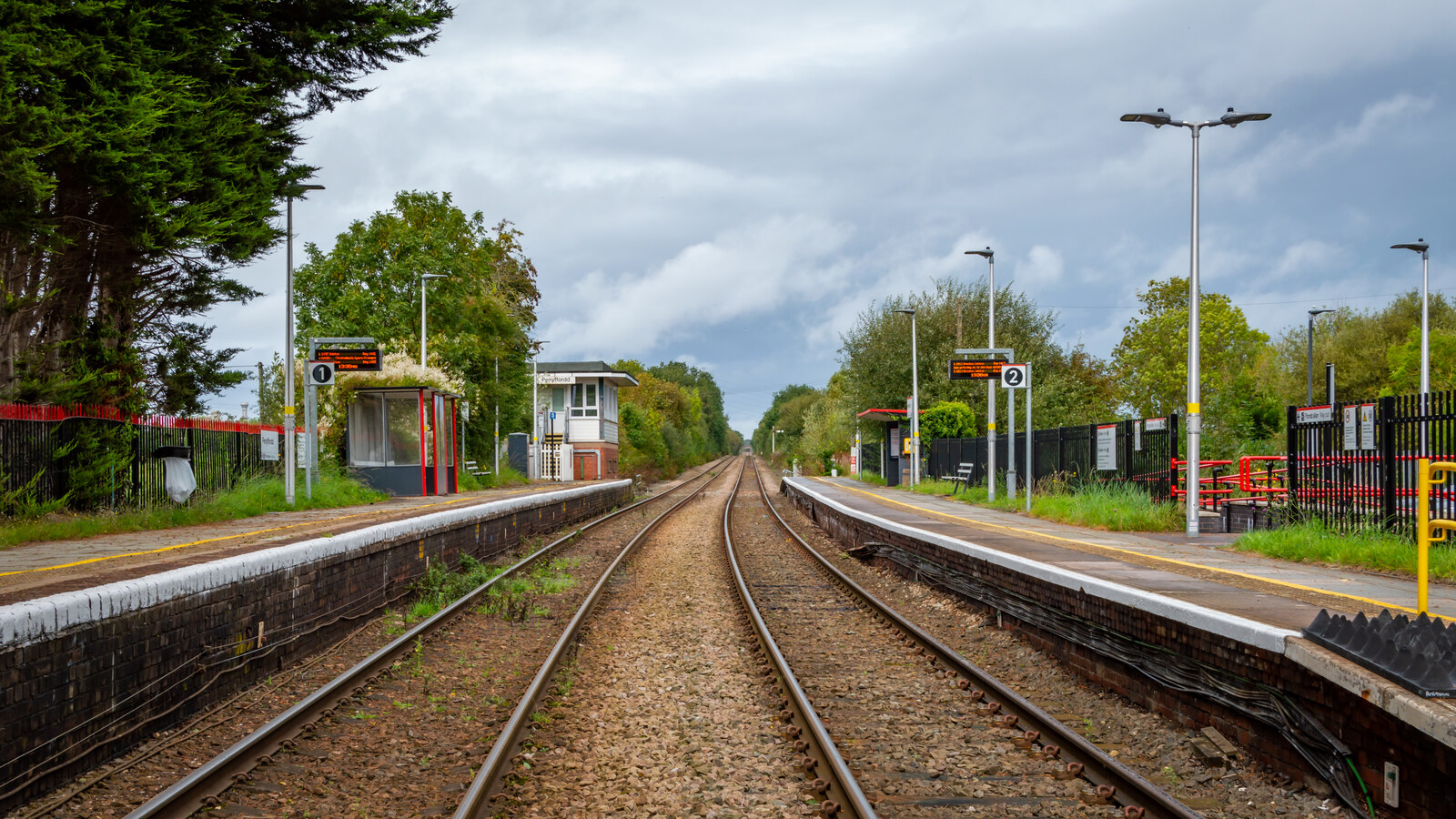

General information
- Location: Penyffordd, Flintshire; Wales
- Coordinates: 53.143°N 3.055°W
- Grid reference: SJ295611
- Manager: Transport for Wales
- Platforms: 2

Other information
- Station code: PNF
- Classification: DfT category F2

Key dates
- 1877: Opened as Hope Junction
- 1877: Renamed as Penyffordd for Hope
- 1 March 1913: Renamed as Penyffordd for Leeswood
- 1974: Renamed as Penyffordd

Passengers
- 2021/22: ▲10,808
- 2022/23: ▲17,862
- 2023/24: ▲18,202
- 2024/25: ▲28,554
- 2025/26: ▲40,582
Location
Notes
- Passenger statistics from the Office of Rail and Road

Penyffordd railway station serves the village of Penyffordd in Flintshire, Wales. The station is 7¼ miles (12 km) north of Wrexham Central on the Borderlands Line.

== History ==
The station was opened in 1877 by the Wrexham, Mold and Connah's Quay Railway, on their 1866 line from Wrexham to Buckley. The line north of the station branched to the west running onto the LNWR line from Chester to Denbigh via Mold, which passed beneath the Borderlands route a short distance to the north. The route closed to passengers in 1962, but the connection to it from the station was used for freight traffic towards Mold until 1983 to serve the Synthite factory in Mold. The curve of the branch from the Borderlands line west was used as sidings which still remain, however are disused. The east to west line from Chester to Mold was lifted in 1985. The station's 24-lever signal box, which opened in 1885, controlled these and a second siding link into the nearby Castle Cement factory - this latter connection is still occasionally used by trainloads of imported coal to supply the factory kilns. The current signal box was opened on 17 December 1972.

On the eastern side of the station was an adjoining goods yard which closed on 4 May 1964, and reopened on 4 October 1971 for distributing coal. The station became an unstaffed halt in 1969.

The station was renamed from Penyffordd for Leeswood to Penyffordd on 6 May 1974.

== Facilities ==
The station has no ticket facilities, so these must be bought in advance of travel or on the train. The original buildings have been replaced with standard waiting shelters. Train running information is offered via CIS screens, telephone (on platform 2) and timetable poster boards. There is step-free access to both platforms, but the station is not listed as DDA-compliant due to the barrow crossing linking the platforms and latched gate at the main entrance.

== Services ==
The station is served every 40mins by a service southbound to Wrexham General and northbound to Bidston for connections to Liverpool via the Wirral Lines. This drops to a two-hourly frequency in the evenings. From December 2017 A normal weekday frequency now runs on most Bank holidays.

On Sundays there is a train roughly every 90 minutes in each direction.

Preceding station	National Rail	Following station
Hope	Transport for Wales; Borderlands Line	Buckley
	Historical railways	
Hope	Great Central Railway; Wrexham, Mold and Connah's Quay Railway	Hope Exchange

== Bibliography ==
- Mitchell, Vic; Smith, Keith (2013). Wrexham to New Brighton. West Sussex: Middleton Press. ISBN 9781908174475. OCLC 859543196.
