= Cefn-y-Bedd railway station =

Railway station in Flintshire, Wales

Cefn-y-Bedd
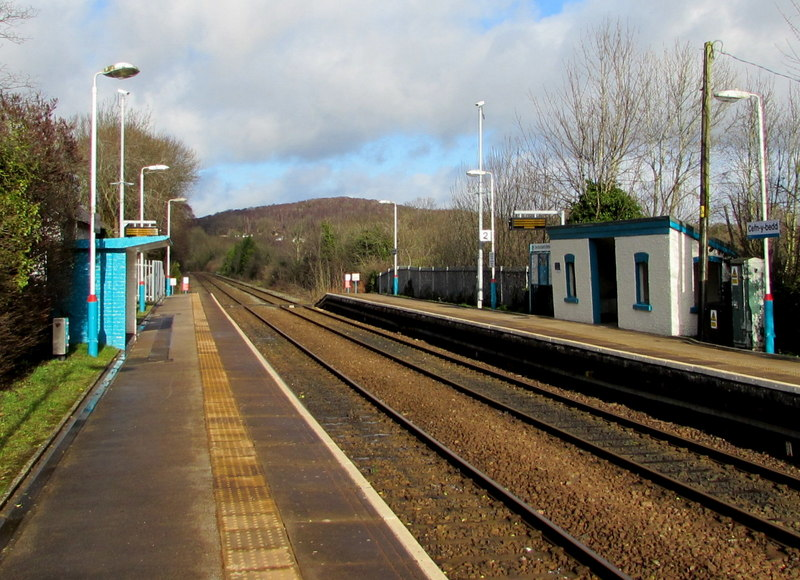

General information
- Location: Cefn-y-Bedd, Flintshire; Wales
- Coordinates: 53.099°N 3.031°W
- Grid reference: SJ310562
- Manager: Transport for Wales
- Platforms: 2

Other information
- Station code: CYB
- Classification: DfT category F2

History
- Opened: 1 May 1866
- Original company: Wrexham, Mold and Connah's Quay Railway
- Pre-grouping: Great Central Railway

Passengers
- 2021/22: ▲3,680
- 2022/23: ▲5,632
- 2023/24: ▼5,076
- 2024/25: ▲8,550
- 2025/26: ▲10,286
Location
Notes
- Passenger statistics from the Office of Rail and Road

Cefn-y-bedd railway station serves the village of Cefn-y-bedd in Flintshire, Wales. The station is 4 miles (6 km) north of Wrexham Central on the Borderlands Line. It was opened in 1866 by the Wrexham, Mold and Connah's Quay Railway, which later became part of the Great Central Railway system.

== History ==
The station used to have a 14-lever signal box to the north of the Bidston-bound platform, and a goods yard adjacent to the western side of the station. The signal box was in use until 1945, and the goods yard closed on 14 May 1964. The station became unstaffed in 1969, but the main building on the northbound side has survived and is now privately owned. The brick shelter on the southbound side is one of only two still standing of that particular design (the other being at nearby Caergwrle).

== Facilities ==
The station is an unstaffed halt with basic amenities only (CIS screens, waiting shelters and timetable poster boards on each platform). Step-free access is available to both sides, though the platform ramps are steep and the only means of access to platform 2 is via a barrow crossing (which should be used with care).

== Services ==
The station sees an hourly service on weekdays (two-hourly in the evening and on bank holidays) southbound to Wrexham Central and northbound to Bidston for connections to Birkenhead and Liverpool via the Wirral Lines.

On Sundays there is a train every 90 minutes each way. Services for Shrewsbury and beyond can be caught by changing at Wrexham General.

Preceding station	National Rail	Following station
Gwersyllt	Transport for Wales; Borderlands Line	Caergwrle

== Gallery ==
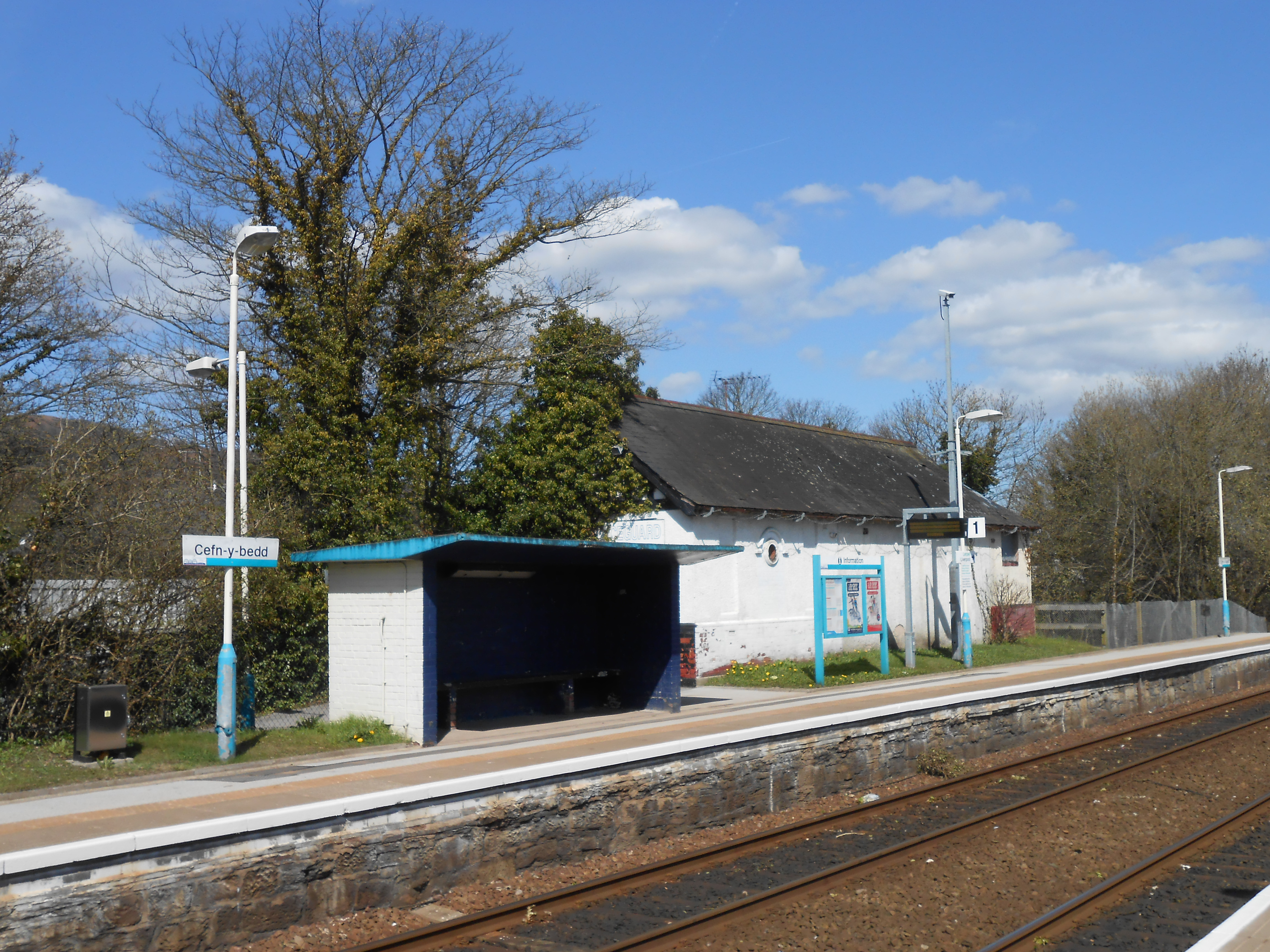
The Bidston-bound platform.

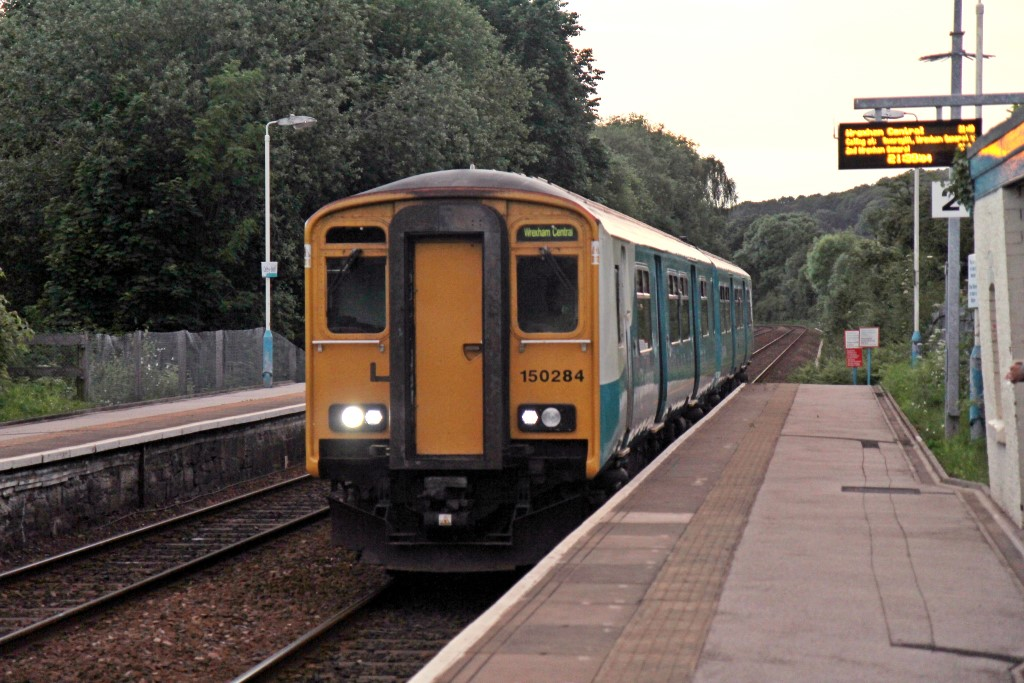
An Arriva Trains Wales Class 150 arrives with a service to Wrexham.

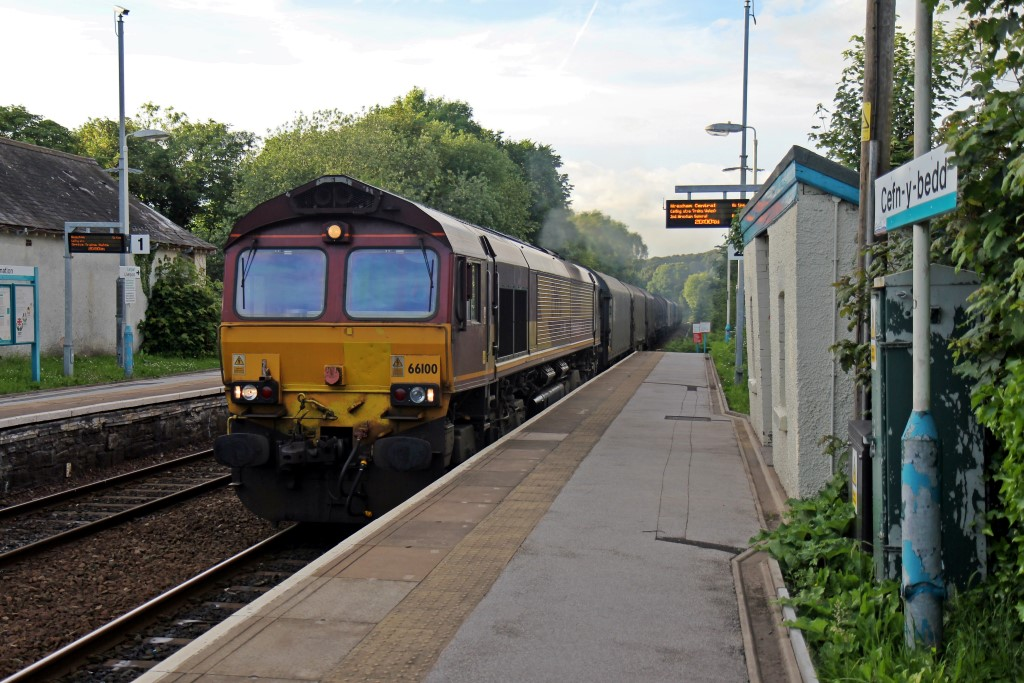
An EWS Class 66 passes through the station with a freight service.

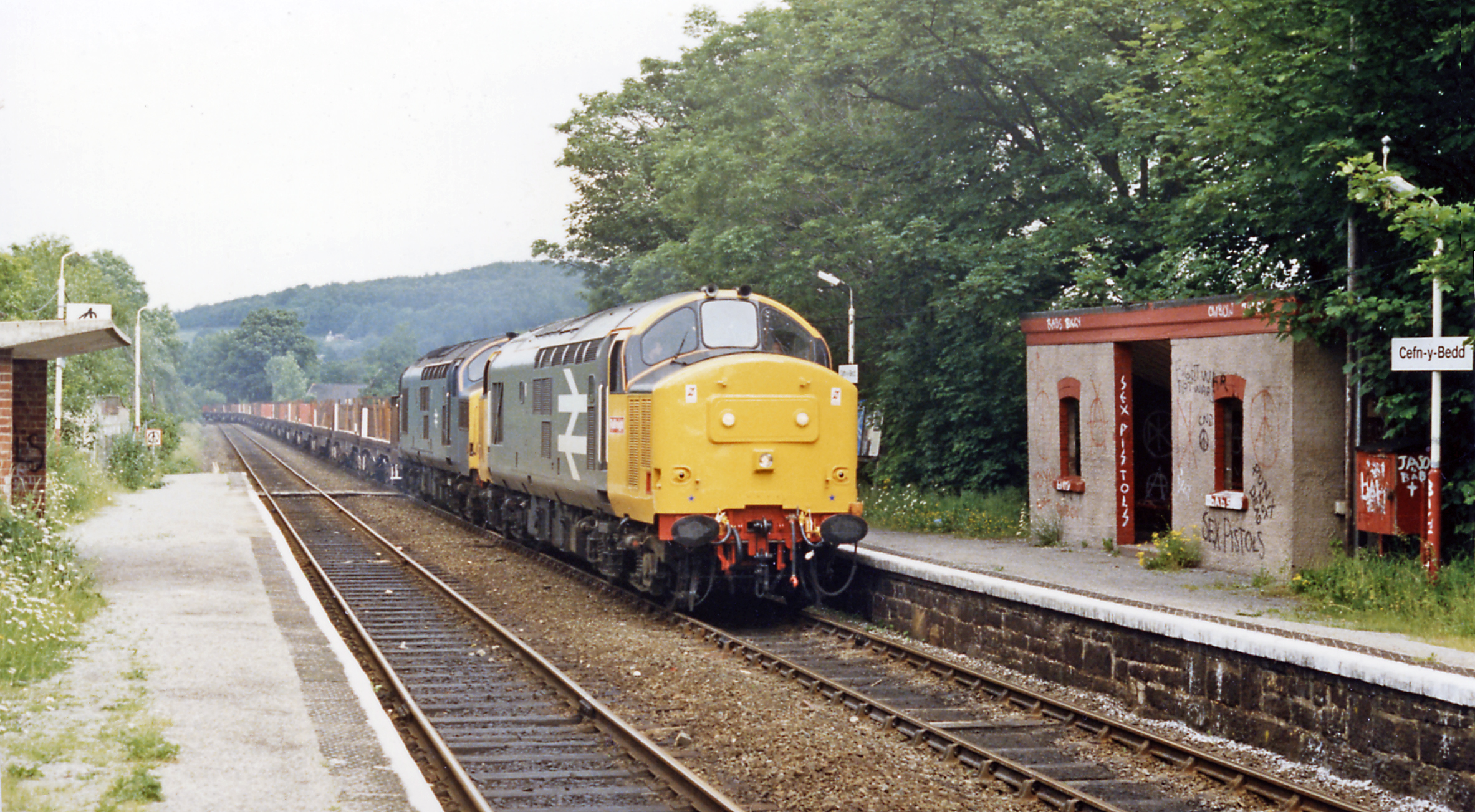
Class 37s at the station in 1986.
