= Caergwrle railway station =

Railway station in Flintshire, Wales

Caergwrle
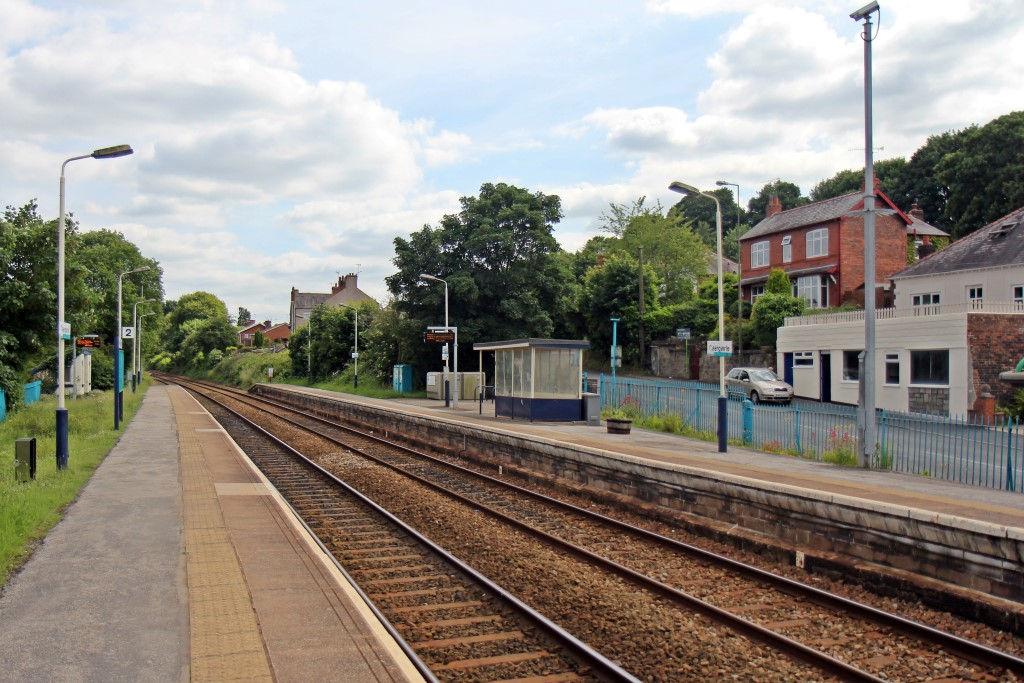

General information
- Location: Caergwrle, Flintshire; Wales
- Coordinates: 53°06′28″N 3°01′59″W
- Grid reference: SJ309572
- Manager: Transport for Wales
- Platforms: 2

Other information
- Station code: CGW
- Classification: DfT category F2

History
- Original company: Wrexham, Mold and Connah's Quay Railway
- Pre-grouping: Great Central Railway

Key dates
- June 1872: Opened as Bridge End
- November 1898: Renamed Caergwrle Castle
- October 1905: Renamed Caergwrle Castle and Wells
- 6 May 1974: Renamed

Passengers
- 2021/22: ▲7,806
- 2022/23: ▲9,866
- 2023/24: ▼9,742
- 2024/25: ▲14,738
- 2025/26: ▲18,164
Location
Notes
- Passenger statistics from the Office of Rail and Road

Caergwrle railway station serves the village of Caergwrle in Flintshire, Wales. The station is 4¾ miles (7 km) north of Wrexham Central on the Borderlands Line.

== History ==
The station was opened as Bridge End in June 1872. From 1885, the station had a signal box towards the southern end of the Wrexham-bound platform, which was named Caergwrle Castle Station signal box from 1898 until 1972. On 1 January 1899, the station itself was renamed to Caergwrle Castle, with the & Wells suffix being included from 1 October 1908. By 1912, the station had a lengthy siding, extending to the north-west, to the Lascelles and Sharman brewery.

The station was renamed from Caergwrle Castle & Wells to Caergwrle on 6 May 1974, and the signal box was closed on 28 November 1982.

== Facilities ==
The station is unstaffed and has no ticketing provision, so these must be purchased on the train or in advance of travel. There are waiting shelters on both platforms - the one on the southbound side is of brick construction and uses a design unique to this particular route. The only other amenities provided are CIS displays and timetable poster boards on each side and a bike stand on platform 1 (the former building on the northbound side was demolished after the station became unstaffed in 1969). No step-free access is available to either platform.

== Services ==
The basic off-peak service consists of one train per hour to Bidston (for connections to Birkenhead Park and Liverpool Lime Street via the Wirral Line), and one to Wrexham Central. In the evenings and on bank holidays, this drops to one every second hour. There is a train every 90 minutes in each direction on Sundays.

Preceding station	National Rail	Following station
Cefn-y-Bedd	Transport for Wales; Borderlands Line	Hope

== Gallery ==
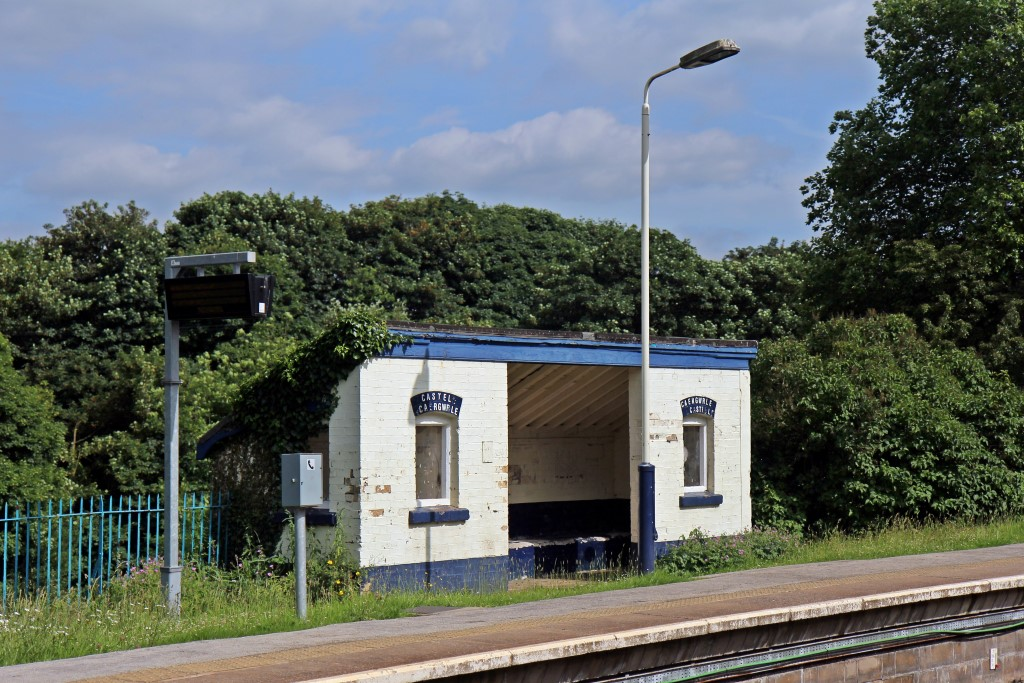
The waiting shelter on platform 2

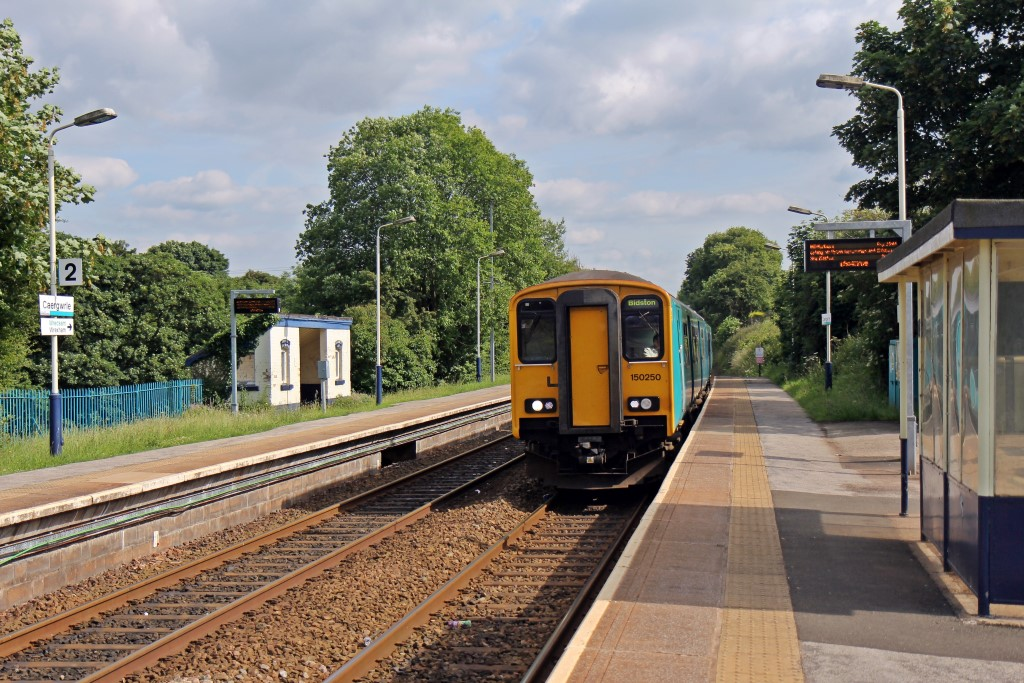
An Arriva Trains Wales Class 150 at the station

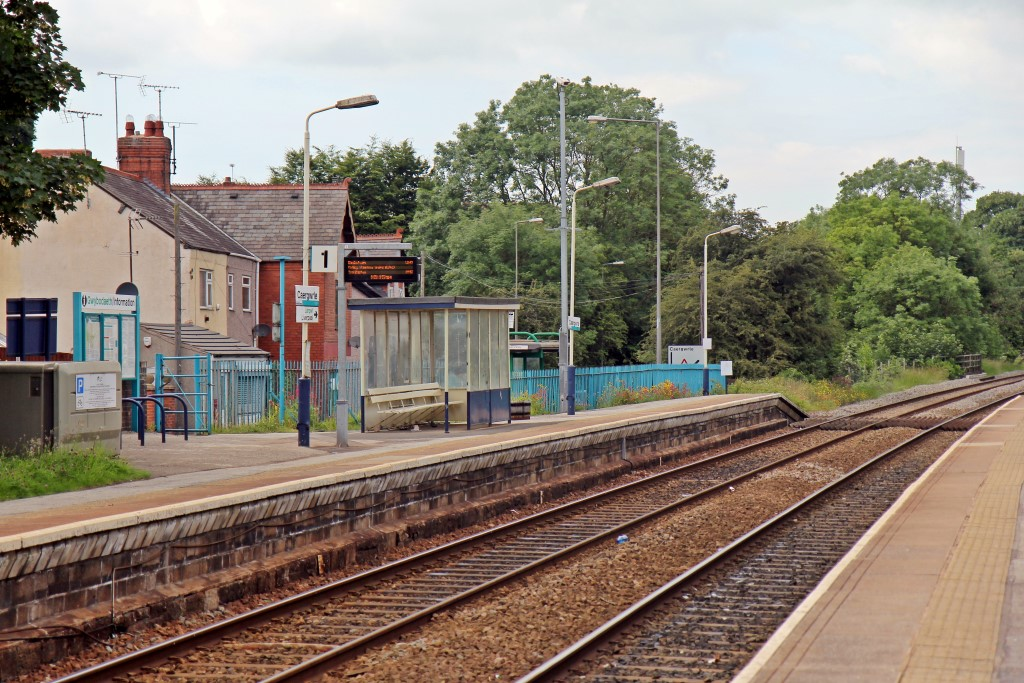
Platform 1

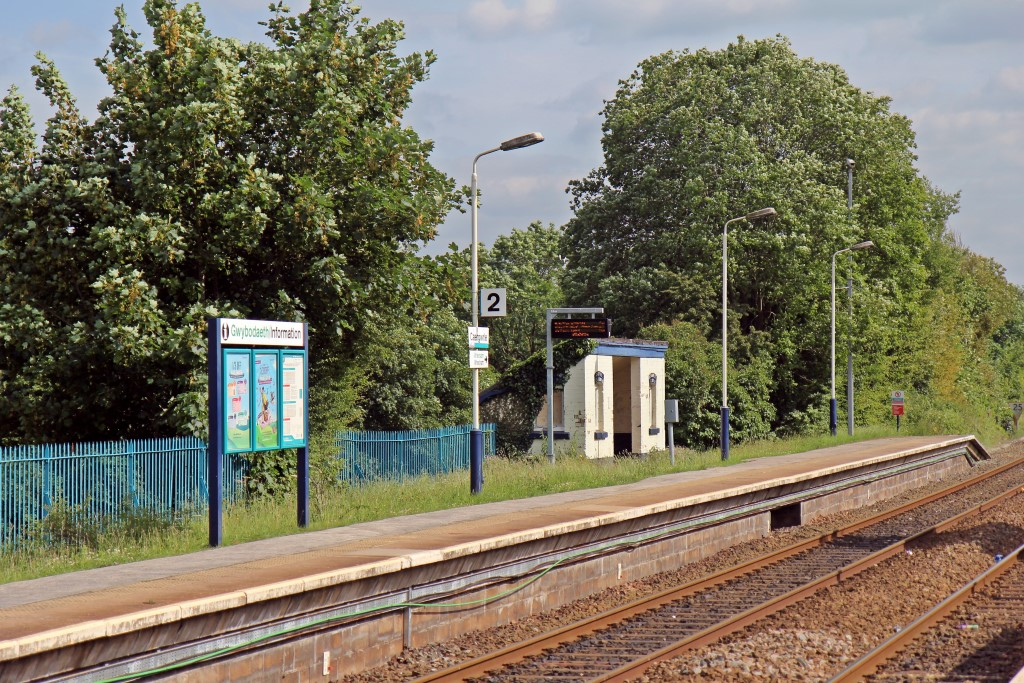
Platform 2

== Sources ==
- Butt, R. V. J. (October 1995). The Directory of Railway Stations: details every public and private passenger station, halt, platform and stopping place, past and present (1st ed.). Sparkford: Patrick Stephens Ltd. ISBN 978-1-85260-508-7. OCLC 60251199. OL 11956311M.
- Mitchell, Vic; Smith, Keith (2013). Wrexham to New Brighton. West Sussex: Middleton Press. ISBN 9781908174475. OCLC 859543196.
