= Gwersyllt railway station =

Railway station in Wrexham, Wales

Gwersyllt
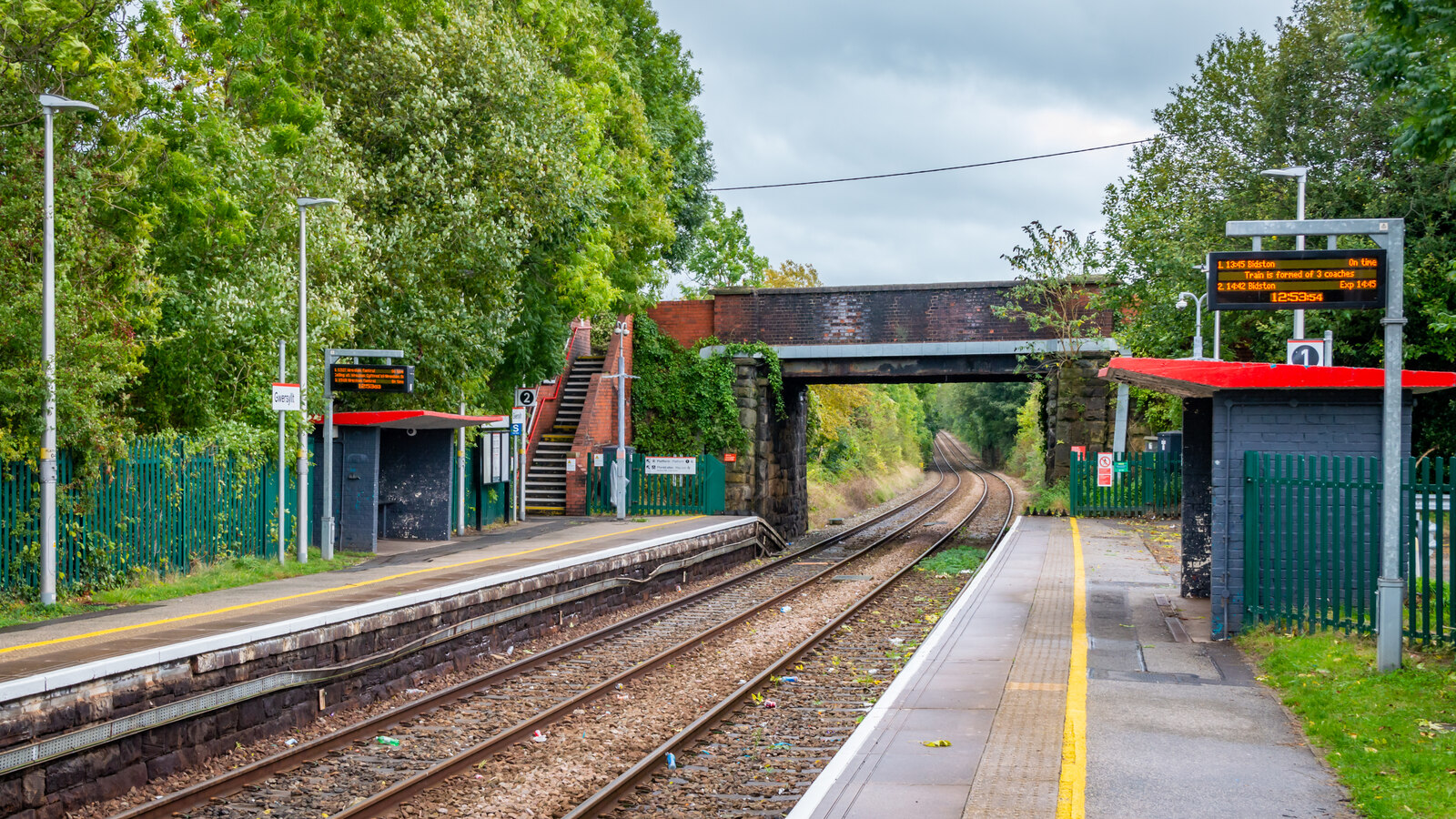

General information
- Location: Gwersyllt, Wrexham; Wales
- Coordinates: 53.073°N 3.018°W
- Grid reference: SJ319533
- Manager: Transport for Wales
- Platforms: 2

Other information
- Station code: GWE
- Classification: DfT category F2

Passengers
- 2021/22: ▲19,432
- 2022/23: ▲19,924
- 2023/24: ▼17,868
- 2024/25: ▲29,408
- 2025/26: ▲34,984
Location
Notes
- Passenger statistics from the Office of Rail and Road

Gwersyllt railway station serves the area of Gwersyllt in the city of Wrexham in North Wales. It is one of five stations in the Wrexham County Borough.

The station is 3.5 km (2¼ miles) north of Wrexham Central on the Borderlands Line and was opened in 1866. The station used to have a signal box at the northern end of the Bidston-bound platform. A short distance to the south a goods-only branch line (part of the North Wales Mineral Railway network, to Brymbo) crossed the route and the abutments of the bridge it utilised still survive (along with a dip in the track formation). One of the line's main engineering features, the five arch stone viaduct over the River Cegidog is situated on this stretch of the line, but to the north of the station.

== Facilities ==
The station is unstaffed and has no ticket provision (these must be bought on the train or prior to travel). Amenities provided here are limited to waiting shelters (there being no other permanent structures left here), CIS displays and timetable poster boards. There is a car park behind the northbound platform, which adjoins that belonging to a local supermarket. Level access can be had from there to both platforms, though the southbound one requires the use of a barrow crossing. Access is also possible to both platforms from the road bridge at the south end, though this has steps on both sides.

== Services ==
Weekdays (daytime) the line is served by two units, providing an hourly service each way (southbound to Wrexham Central and northbound to Bidston). After 18:45 (and all day on bank holidays) the service is provided by one unit, giving one train in each direction every two hours.

On Sundays the service is roughly every 90 minutes.

There is a connection at Bidston for onward travel for stations to Liverpool Central via the Wirral Line and at Wrexham General for stations to Shrewsbury and beyond and for Chester.

Preceding station	National Rail	Following station
Wrexham General	Transport for Wales; Borderlands Line	Cefn-y-Bedd

== Gallery ==
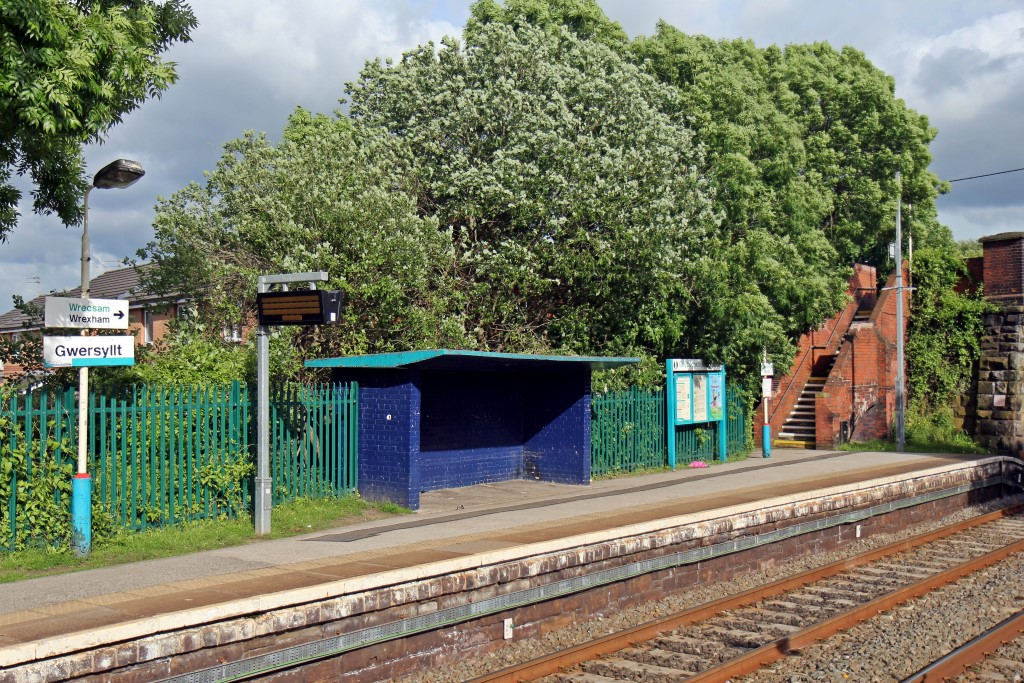
The Wrexham-bound platform.

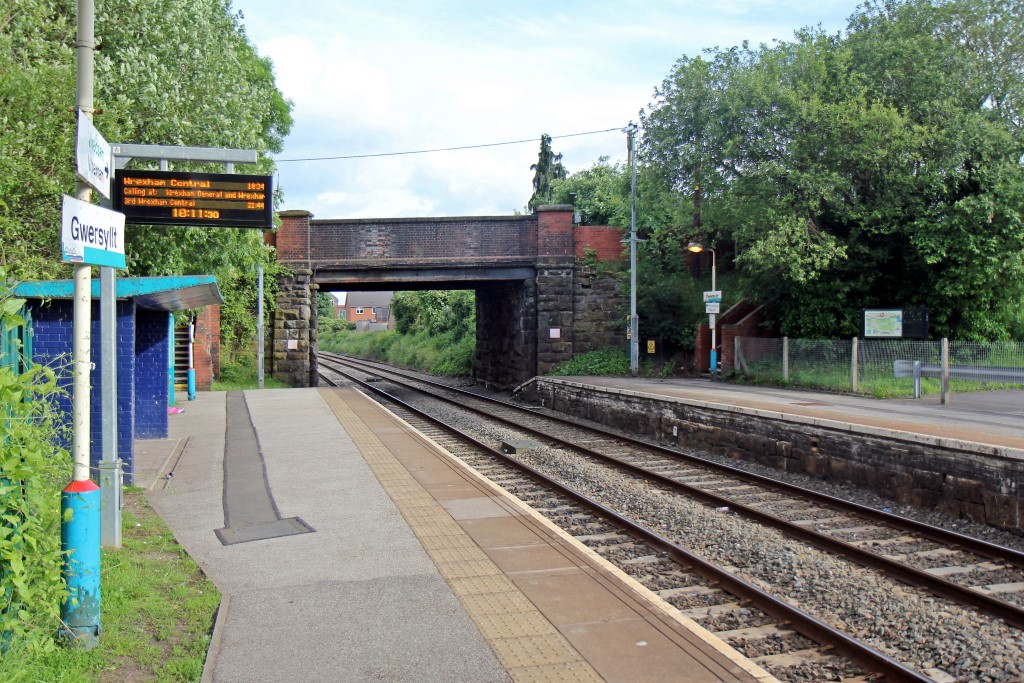
Hope Street bridge, at the southern end of the platforms.

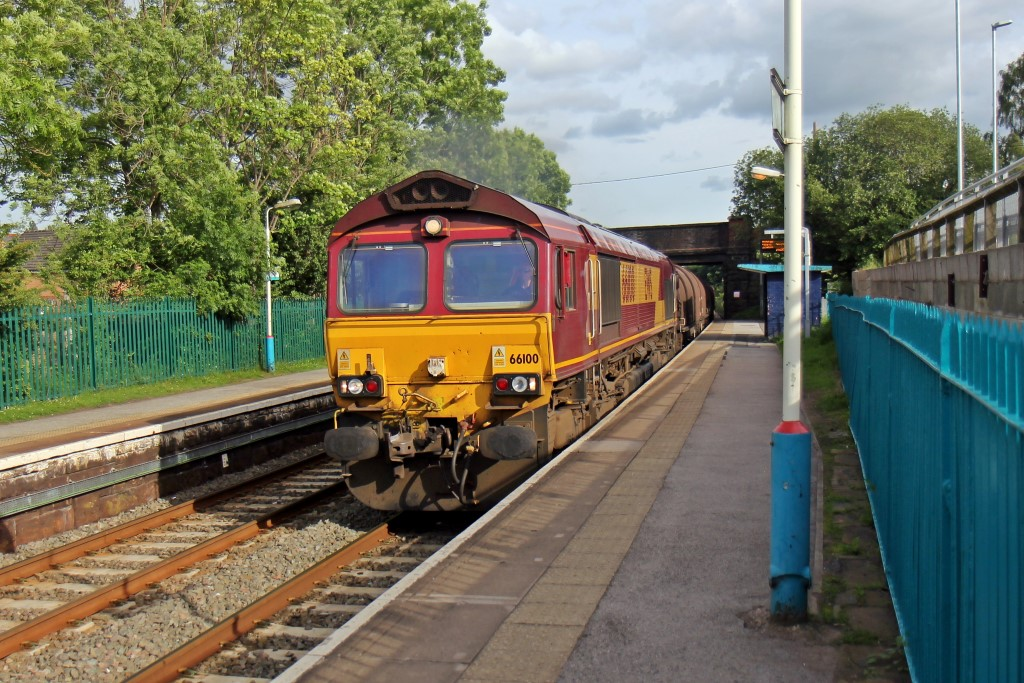
An EWS Class 66, running north through the station, with a freight train.

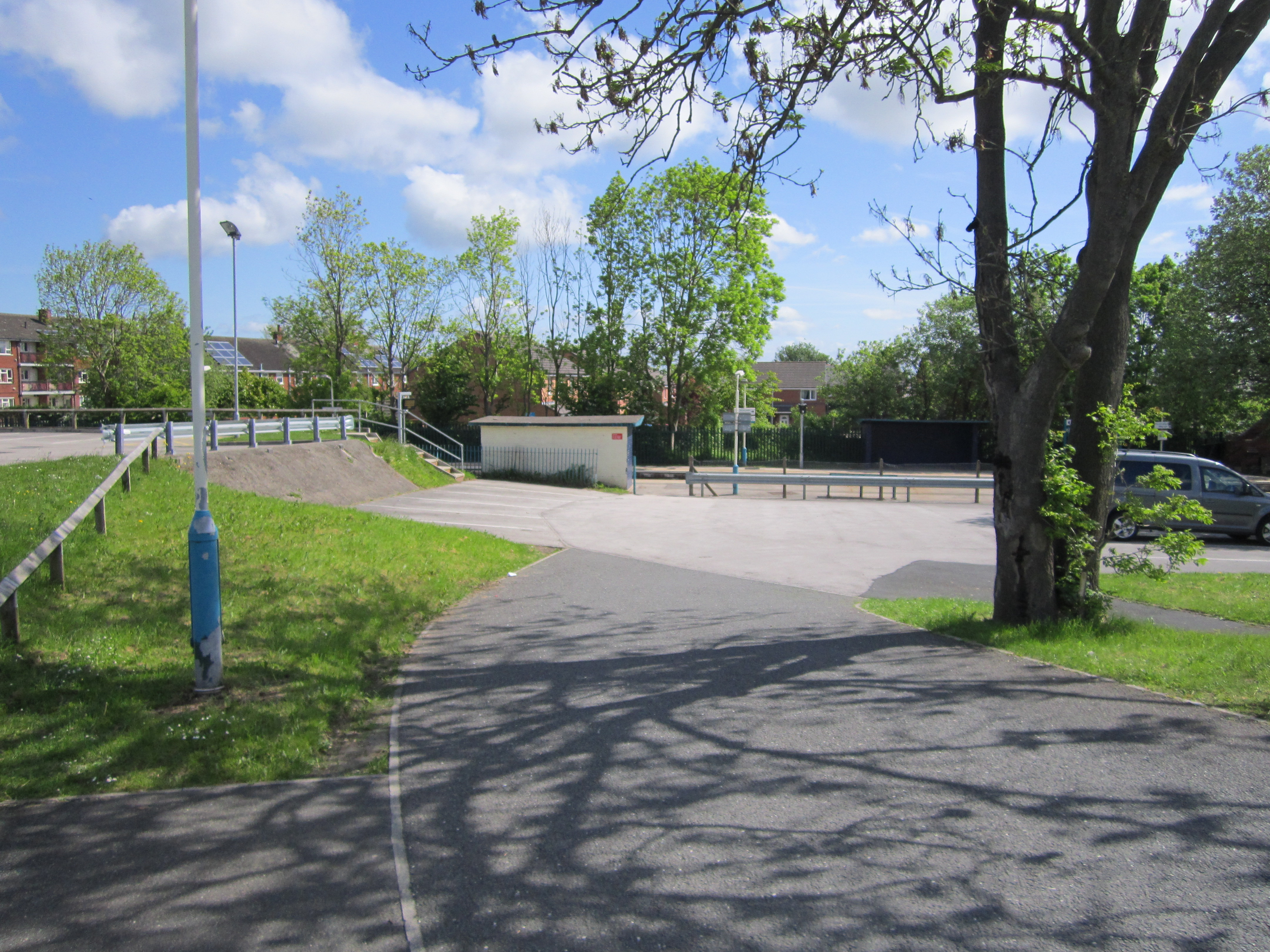
The station car park, adjacent to the Bidston-bound platform.

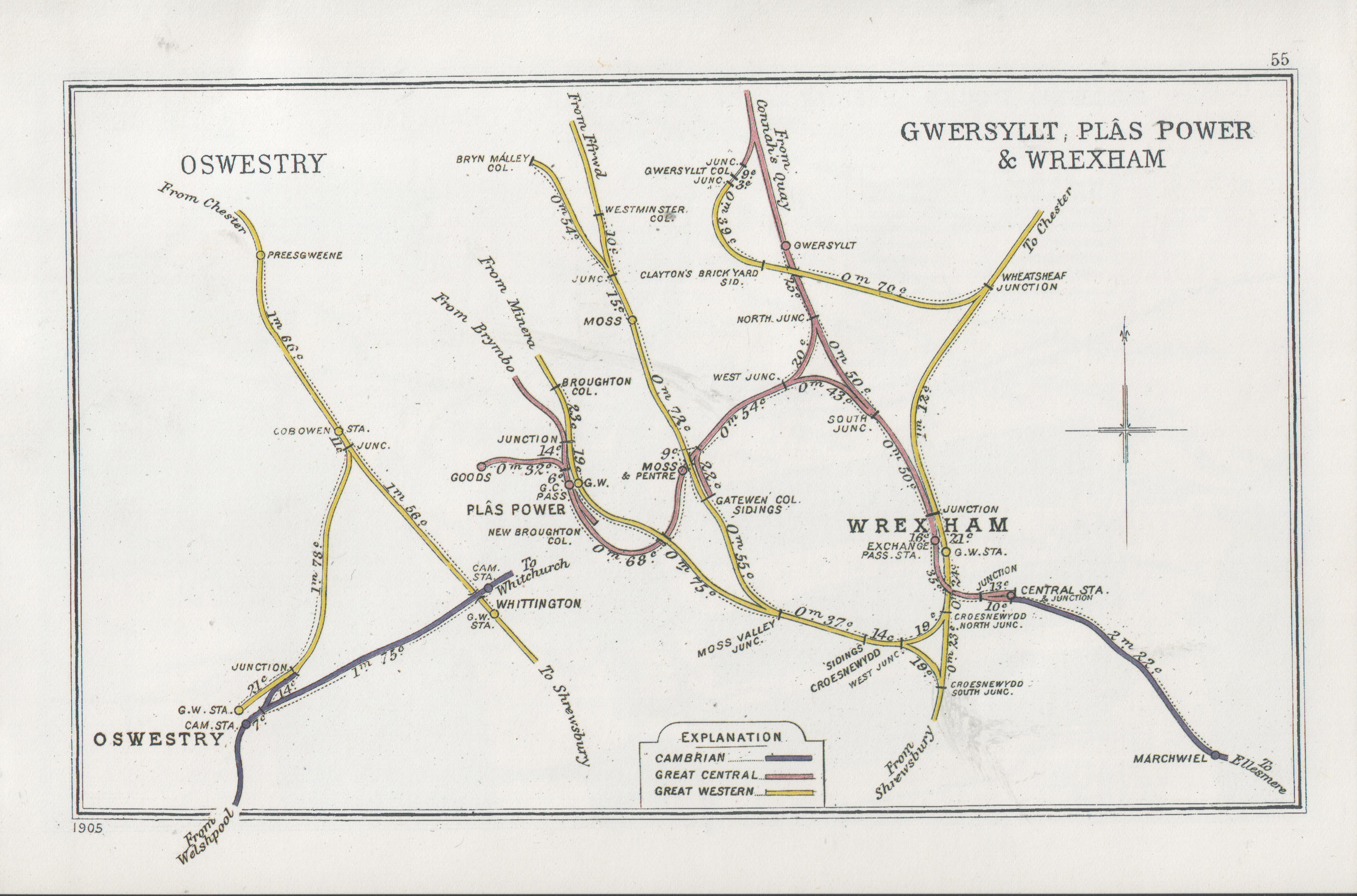
Oswestry, Gwersyllt, Plas Power & Wrexham on the Railway Clearing House map.
