= Railway electrification in Scotland =

Scottish railway modernisation

Railway electrification in Scotland has proceeded in a different fashion than the rest of Great Britain, especially in the 21st century. There is political commitment to a substantial rolling programme of railway electrification from the Scottish government where transport is devolved. In January 2022, there were 2,776 km (1,725 mi) of track in Scotland, and 711 km (442 mi) were electrified representing 25.3%. To meet these needs, the plan is to electrify on average 130 single track kilometres (STK) per year until 2035, although there has been some slippage in this target.

== 20th-century history ==
Much of the Glasgow suburban network was electrified by 1960 with the introduction of the Class 303 electric multiple units, known locally as "Blue Trains". Electrified power lines began to appear at Glasgow Central station high-level platforms at the start of 1960s under British Railways. Firstly came 6.25 kV AC overhead power lines from the Cathcart Circle Line electrification scheme, which started on 29 May 1962. This was followed by the 25 kV AC overhead-power-lines electrification of the Glasgow and Paisley Joint Railway and the Inverclyde Line to Gourock and Wemyss Bay, completed in 1967. An upgrade and maintenance programme of the original electrification was announced in May 2026.

The WCML electrification scheme from Weaver Junction to Glasgow was discussed in 1968 and a report issued, and was completed in 1974 with squadron service starting on 6 May 1974. Progressive upgrading of the Cathcart Circle to 25 kV AC supply was started in 1974 and the whole of the route was upgraded later. The Ayr, Ardrossan and Largs lines were completed in 1986–1987. The East Coast Main Line (ECML) was electrified in stages and reached Edinburgh in 1991. The branch to North Berwick was done at the same time. In this timeframe the Glasgow–Edinburgh via Carstairs line was also electrified although it had been examined in 1978.

== 21st-century history ==
In Scotland, where transport is devolved to the Scottish Government, Transport Scotland has extended and continues to expand electrification. The Airdrie–Bathgate rail link and the Whifflet Line were completed in November 2014. This is part of a larger plan that has seen many major routes in central Scotland electrified, including the main Edinburgh Waverley–Glasgow Queen Street route. They have pursued electrification with multiple schemes in the Central Belt. All these have been 25 kV AC, as in England and Wales. In September 2019, Transport Scotland announced the goal of having Scottish transport net carbon neutral by 2035. This would be achieved by a rolling programme of electrification; where that is not feasible, using battery and other emerging technology such as hydrogen. Electrification to Stirling, Alloa and Dunblane was originally part of Edinburgh to Glasgow Improvement Programme (EGIP). Electrification was completed by 2019; it was carried out under the rolling programme of electrification, rather than as part of the EGIP programme. EGIP was an initiative funded by Transport Scotland on behalf of the Scottish Government to increase capacity on the main railway line between Edinburgh and Glasgow, with new, longer electric trains running by 2017 and scheduled for full completion in 2019. It was expected to cost £742 million and delivered by Network Rail.

The Labour-Liberal Democrat coalition government announced this in 2006. It was completed in October 2021 with the Glasgow Queen Street station modernisation. On 28 July 2020, Scottish Transport Secretary Michael Matheson announced plans to phase out fossil fuel use on the railway network by 2035. The plan would see most lines electrified, but suggests that intermittent electrification in difficult places may be implemented. Alternative traction will be implemented rather than electrification for some lightly used lines. These are the Far North Line, Kyle of Lochalsh Line, West Highland Line, and the southern portion of the Stranraer Line. Other Scottish political parties support an accelerated programme. Transport Scotland has also published a list prioritising the projects and divided them into the categories of 1) in delivery, 2) in development, 3) under active consideration. On 1 July 2022, Network Rail confirmed investment and planning for the electrical grid feeders to power the schemes. Scotland electrification is using innovation to achieve its aims. Resiliency of the power supply is considered key and discontinuous electrification with Battery EMUs being used to achieve intermediate goals.

The HLOS- High Level Output Statement for Scotland for CP7 reaffirmed commitment to a rolling programme of electrification and other upgrades. An invitation to tender was sent out on 29 November 2023 for electrification and associated works.

=== Individual schemes ===
- Whifflet and Coatbridge line was to be done before 2014 games
- Edinburgh to Glasgow Improvement Programme
- Levenmouth rail link
- Airdrie-Bathgate Rail Link
- Larkfield to East Kilbride
- Fife route - started June 2022.
- Borders Railway electrification.

=== East Kilbride & Barrhead Lines scheme ===
In early 2021 a start was made on the electrification of the railway line to East Kilbride and Barrhead. The first electric train ran to Barrhead on 7 November 2023. On 25 January 2025 the East Kilbride line closed for a scheduled 16 week closure to complete the project, which entailed the installation of OHLE between Thornliebank and East Kilbride, the extension of the passing loop between East Kilbride and Hairmyres and the relocation and construction of a new station at Hairmyres, with the line reopening on 18 May 2025. In the early hours of the morning on 14 October 2025, a Class 380 Desiro unit and a Class 385 AT200 unit were successfully tested on the newly electrified East Kilbride line with electric services due to begin on 14 December 2025.

=== Fife Circle Line scheme ===
In June 2022 work commenced on the partial electrification of the Fife Circle Line. This will involve extending the existing Edinburgh area electrification to Dalmeny, and an isolated area of electrification between Kirkcaldy, Lochgelly and Ladybank. This will allow the Fife Circle services to be operated by battery electric multiple units whilst minimising capital expenditure on infrastructure, in particular avoiding the major expense of electrifying the Forth Bridge. Complete electrification would be possible at some future date. The partial electrification was due to be completed by December 2025. Timeline as follows: There has been some slippage in these target dates.

- June 2022 Haymarket to Dalmeny electrification work started.
- December 2024 Haymarket to Dalmeny electrification work initially scheduled for completion.
- December 2025 Partial electrification of Fife Circle Line -initially scheduled.

=== Borders Railway scheme ===
Transport Scotland has put decarbonisation and electrification, possibly partial, fairly high on its agenda and some planning and application work started on Borders Railway electrification in 2022. The power supply capacity is highly used at the north end of the line though grid feeders are being upgraded. To allow for this and ensure enough future capacity, a grid feeder is being installed at Tweedbank. Electrification work started in February 2026 and is due to finish in 2029 with the new electric trains arriving in 2031.

=== Under active consideration ===
Future phases of Decarbonisation Action Plan

- Aberdeen to Central Belt Electrification
- Aberdeen to Inverness Electrification
- Dunblane-Hilton route clearance for future electrification
- Electrification - Ayrshire and Glasgow & South West
- Electrification - Dunfermline Queen Margaret to Longannet
- Electrification - Fife to Perth and Dundee
- Highland Mainline Electrification
- New and enhanced grid feeders to power all the schemes

== Photograph gallery ==
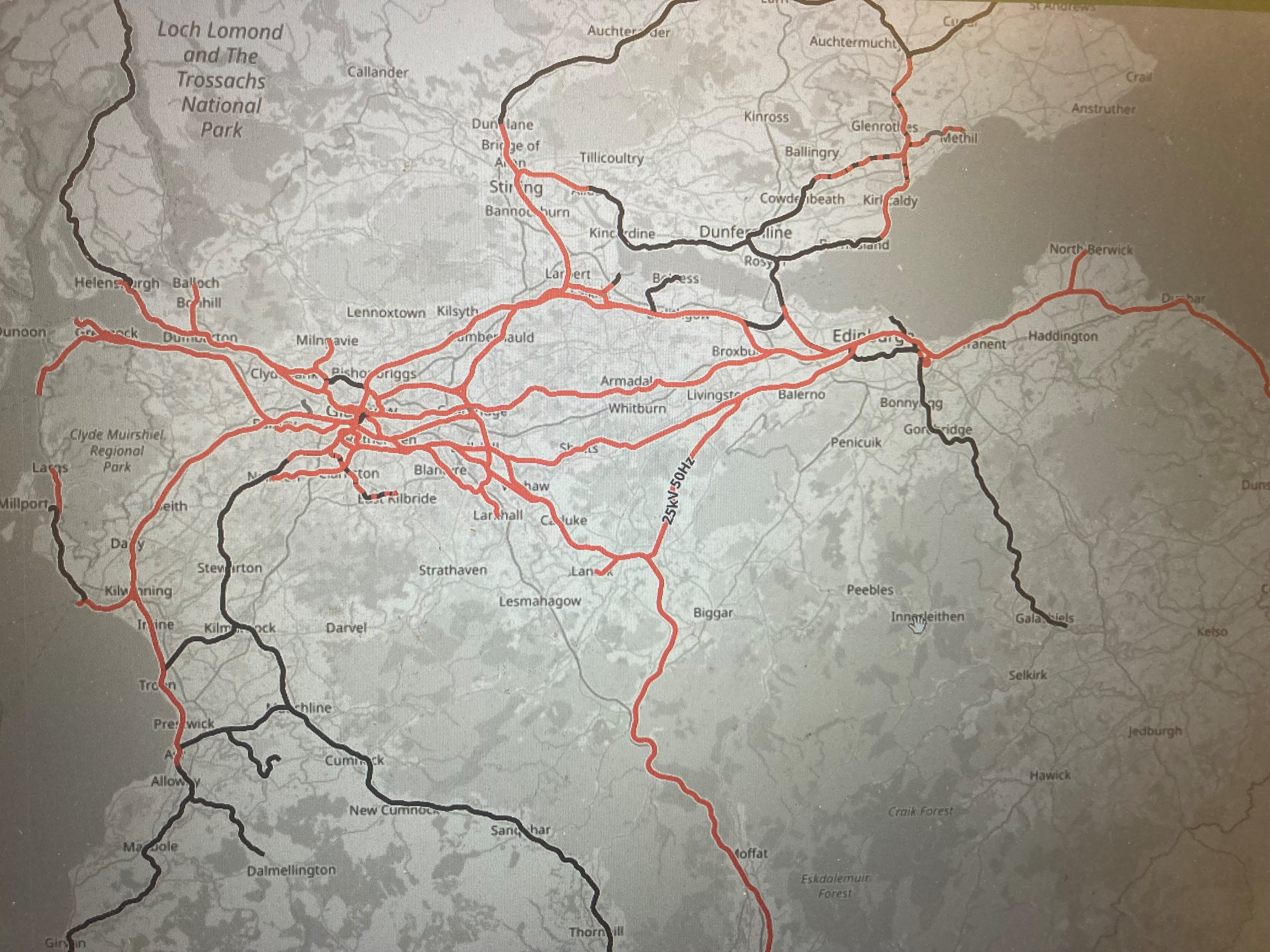
December 2023 extent of Scotland Electrification

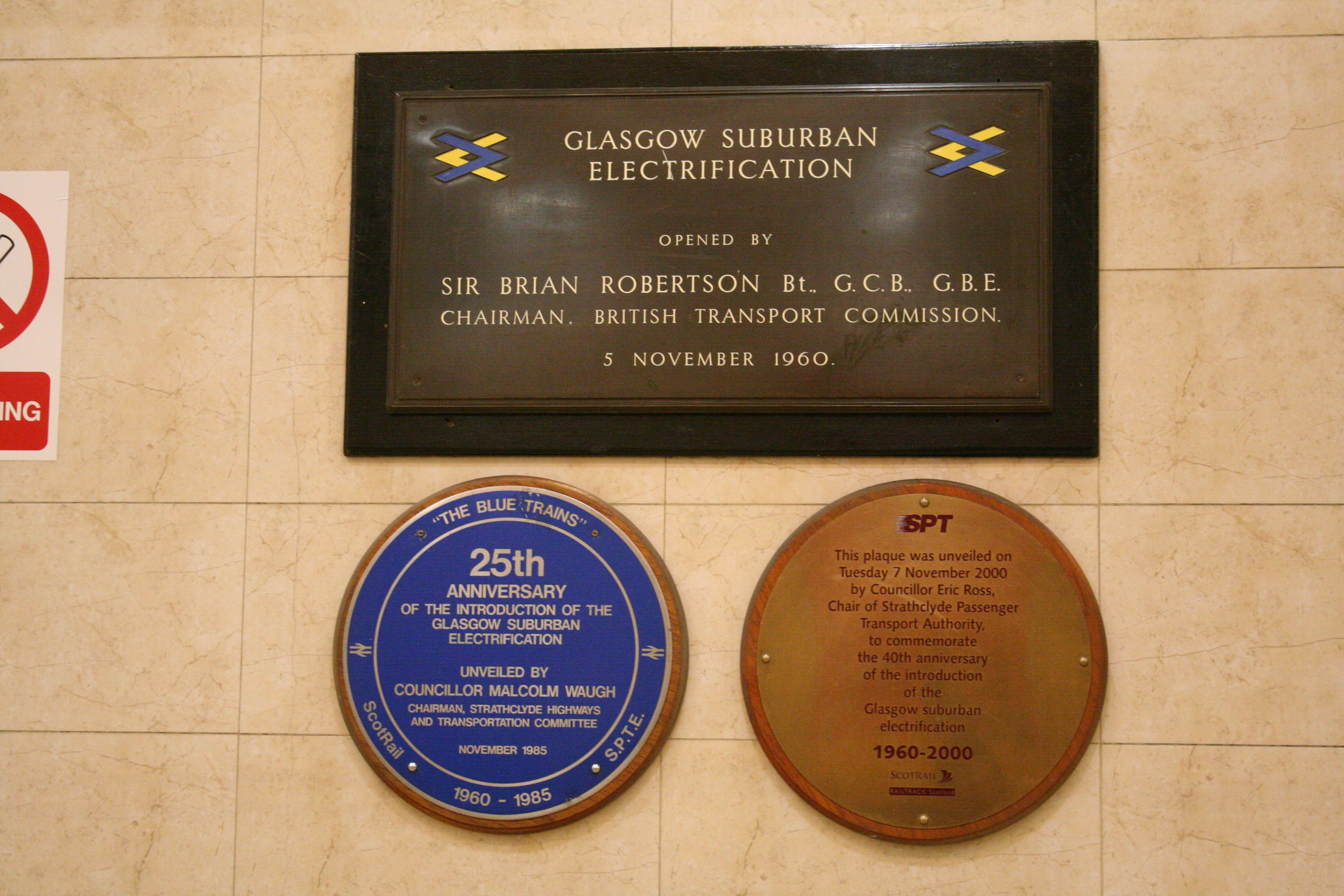
Glasgow Suburban Electrification Commemorative Plaque

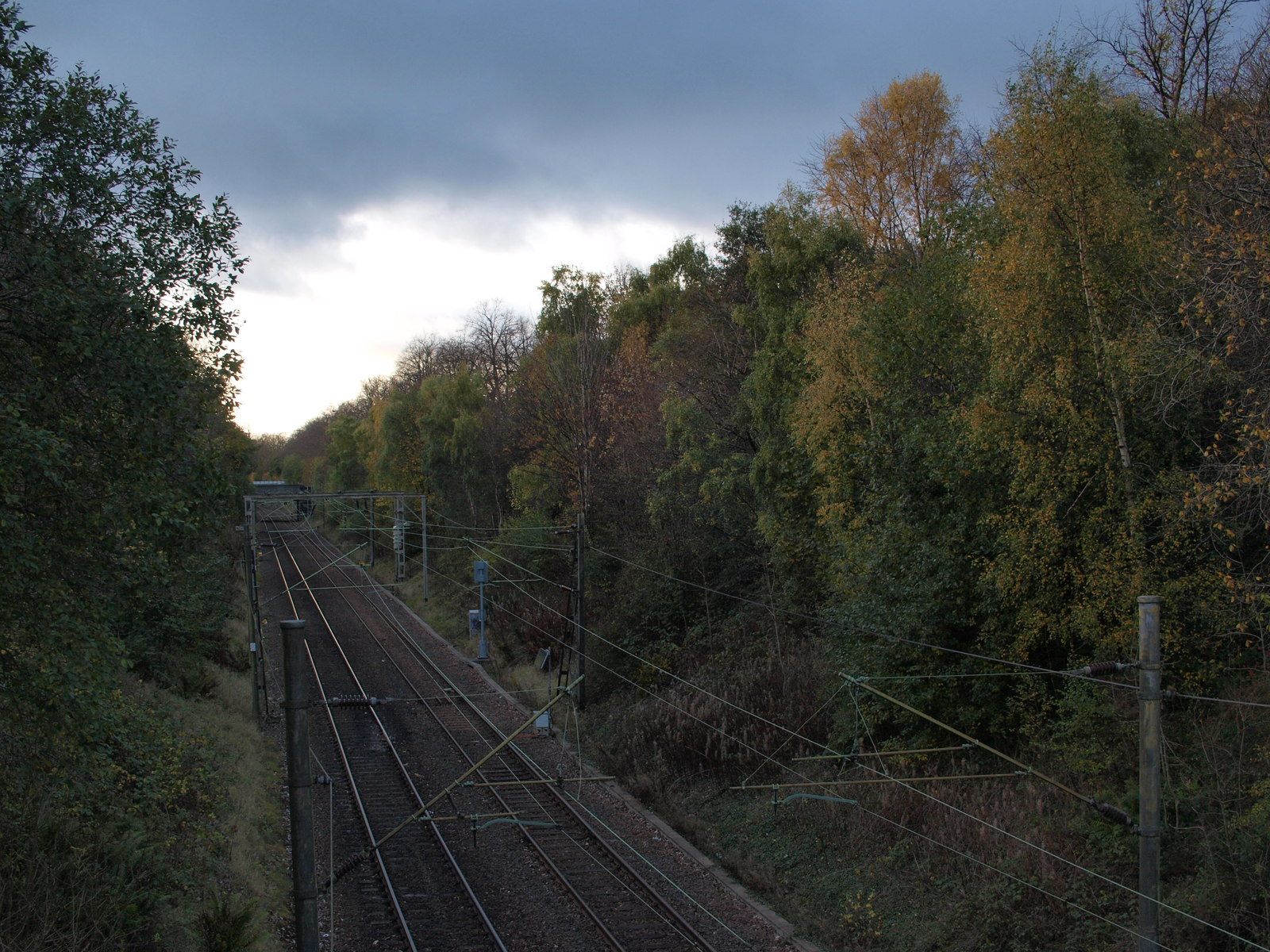
Overhead wires on the Cathcart circle

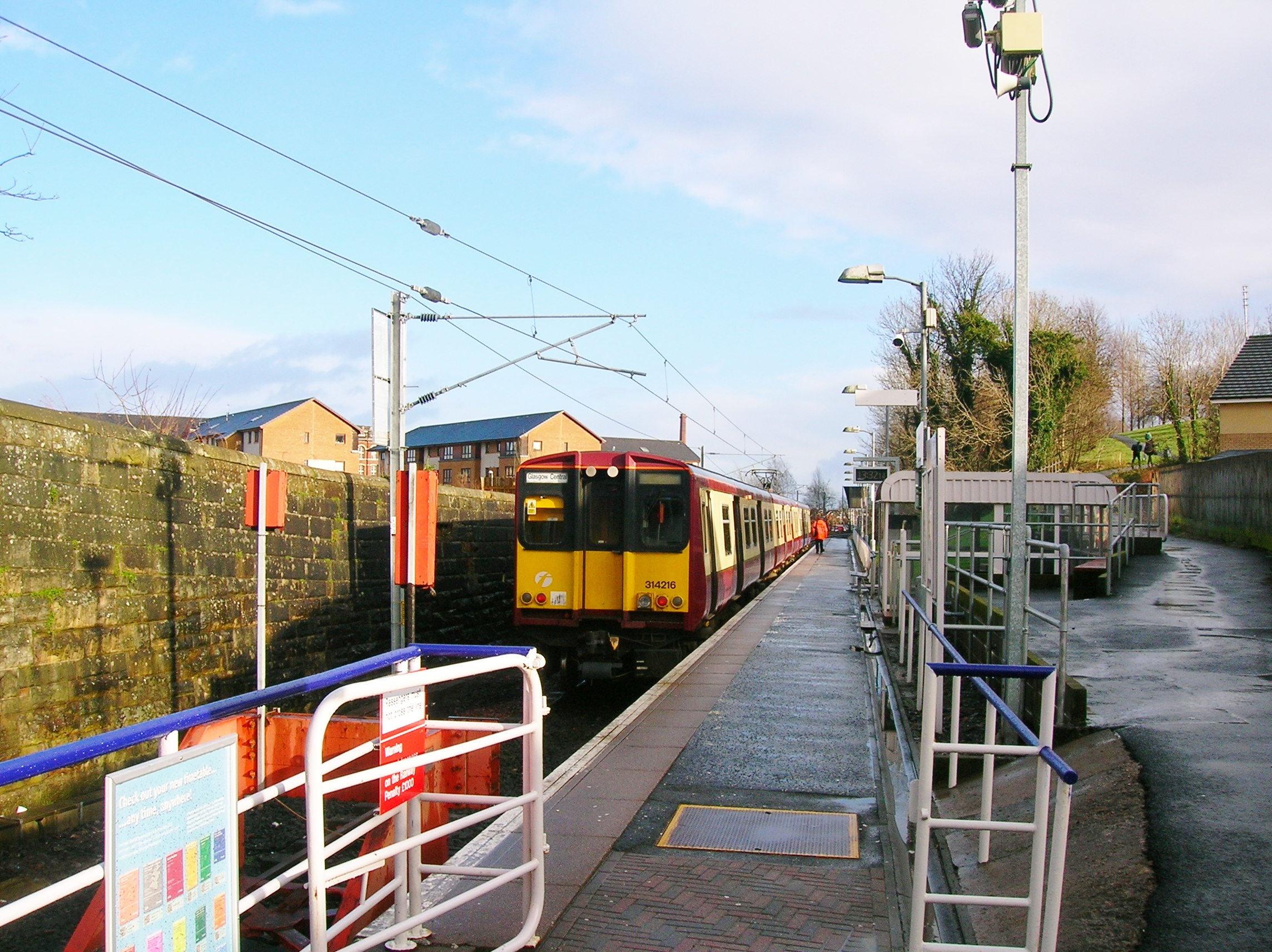
Paisley Canal railway station - after electrification

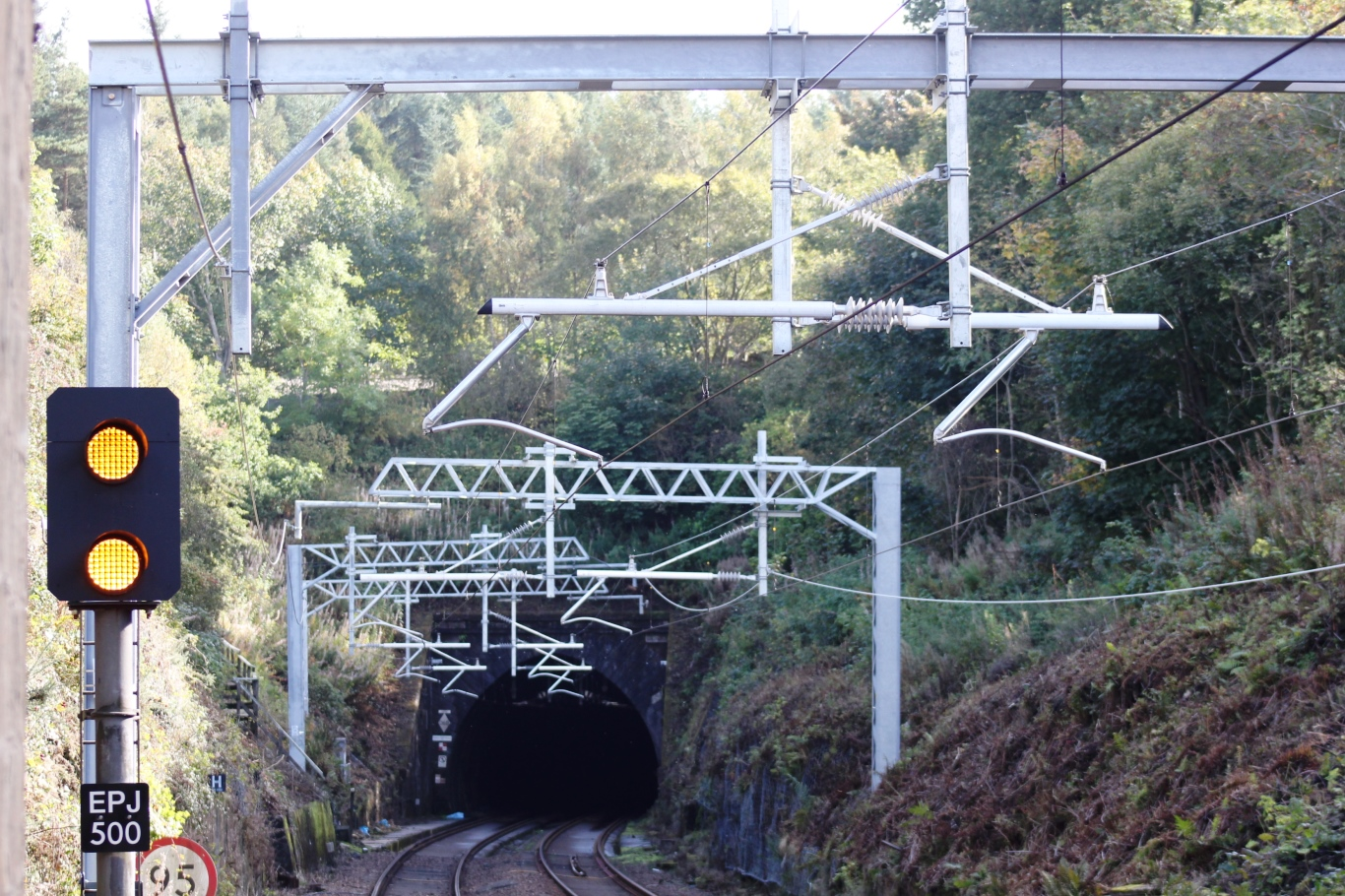
Falkirk High - tunnel west portal 2017 showing electrification masts etc.

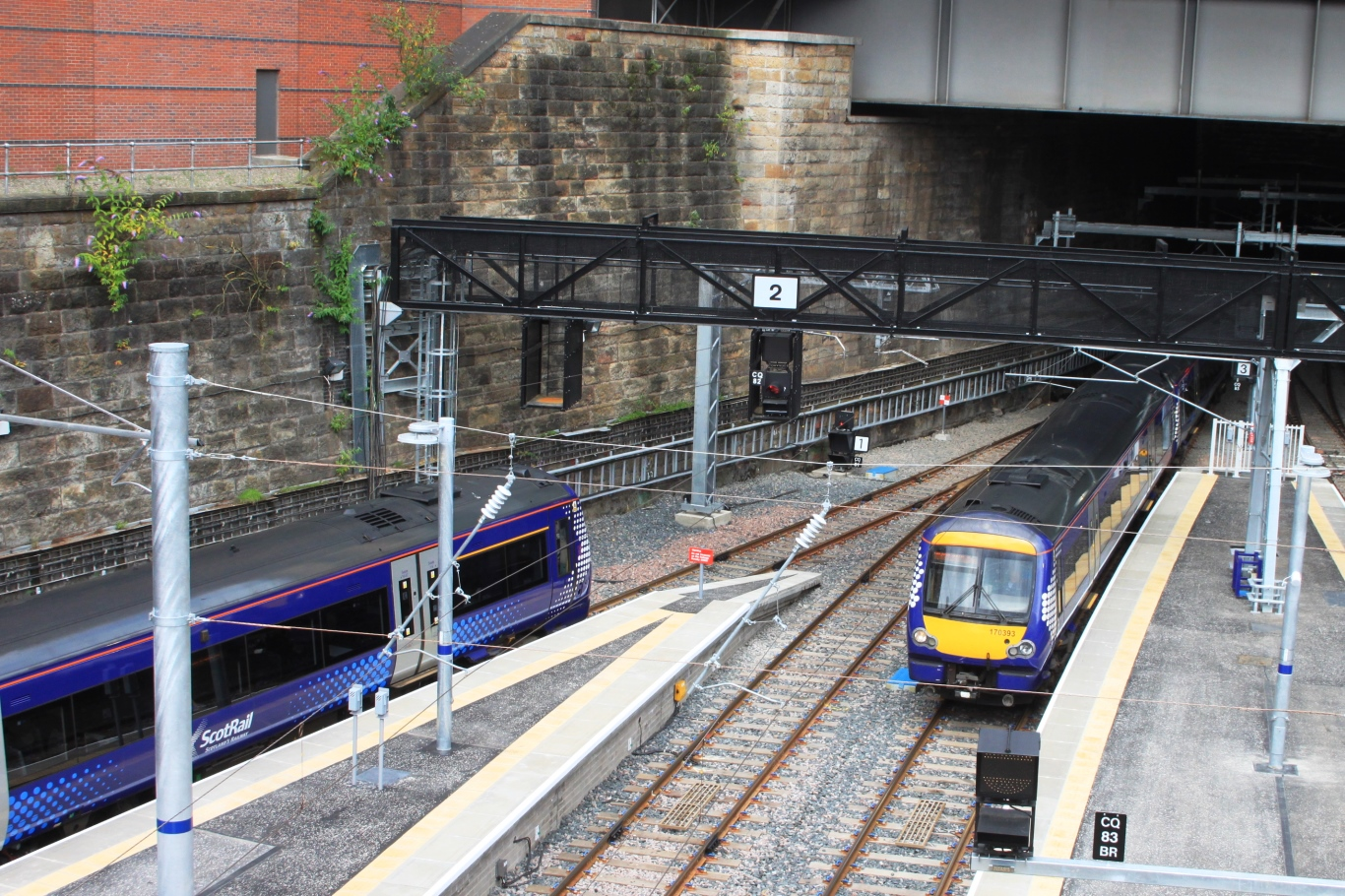
Glasgow Queen Street with electrification equipment in clear view

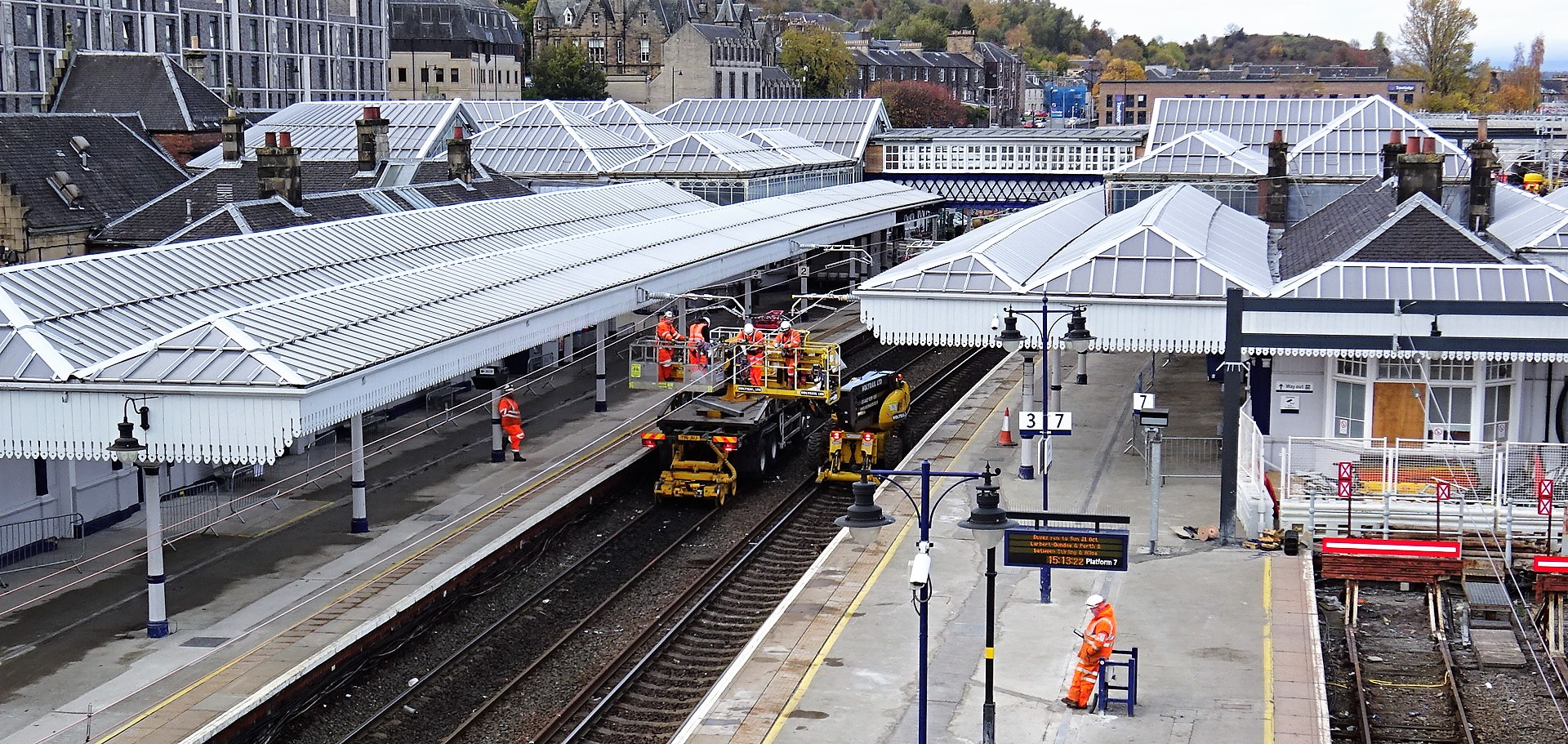
Stirling station electrification, catenary erection, view from footbridge

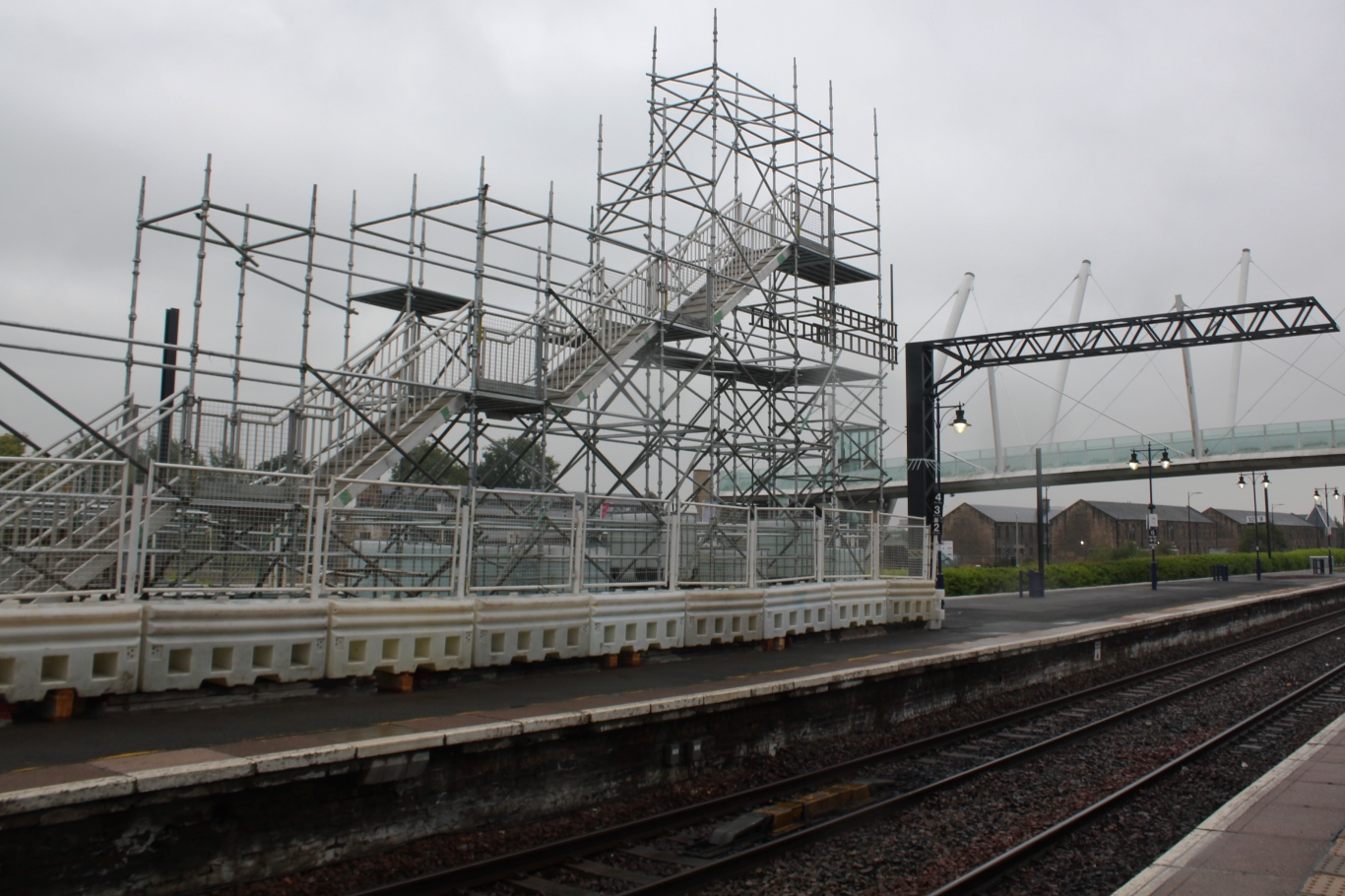
Stirling station - temporary footbridge under construction during electrification

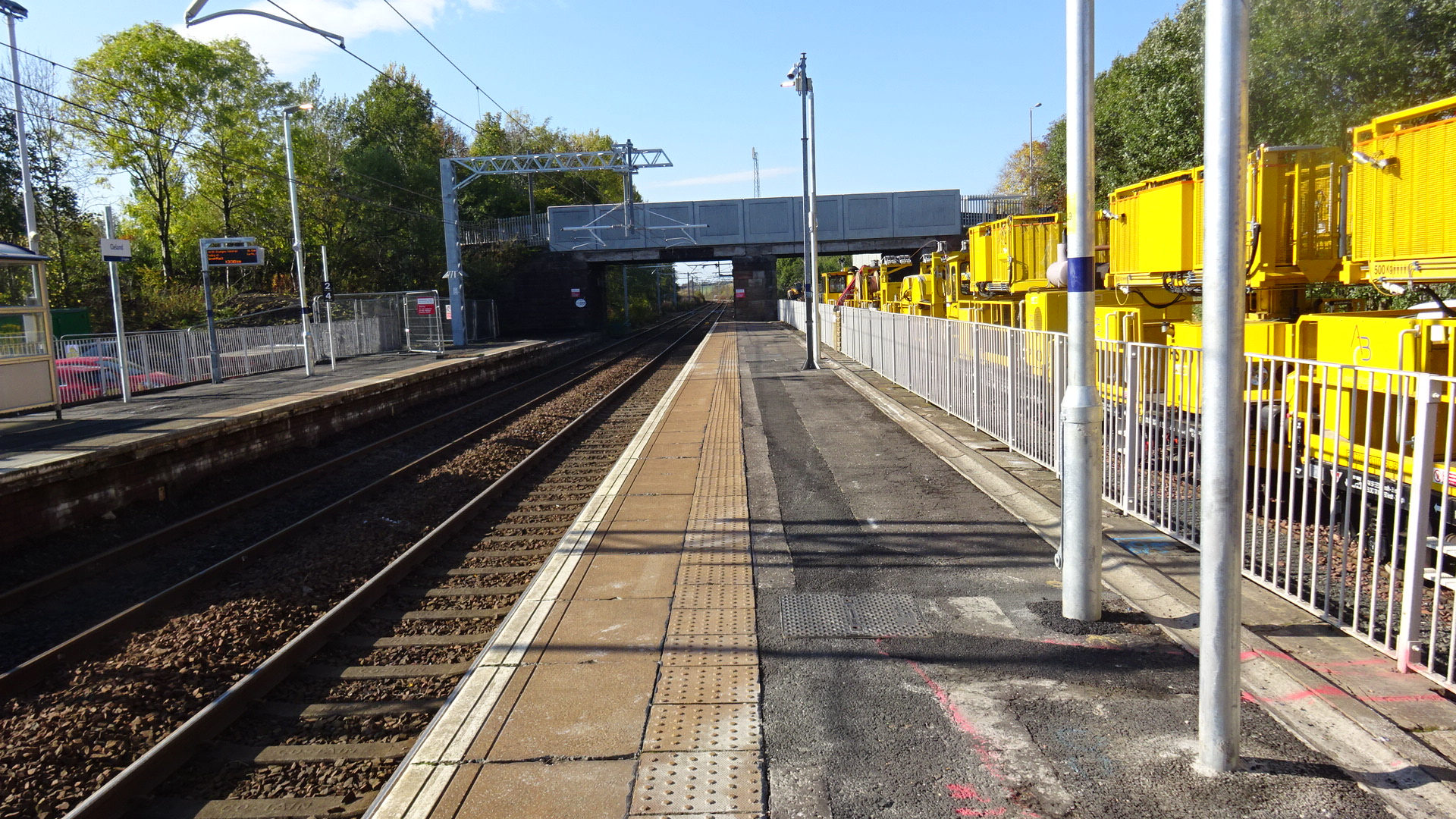
Cleland on the Shotts Line electrification

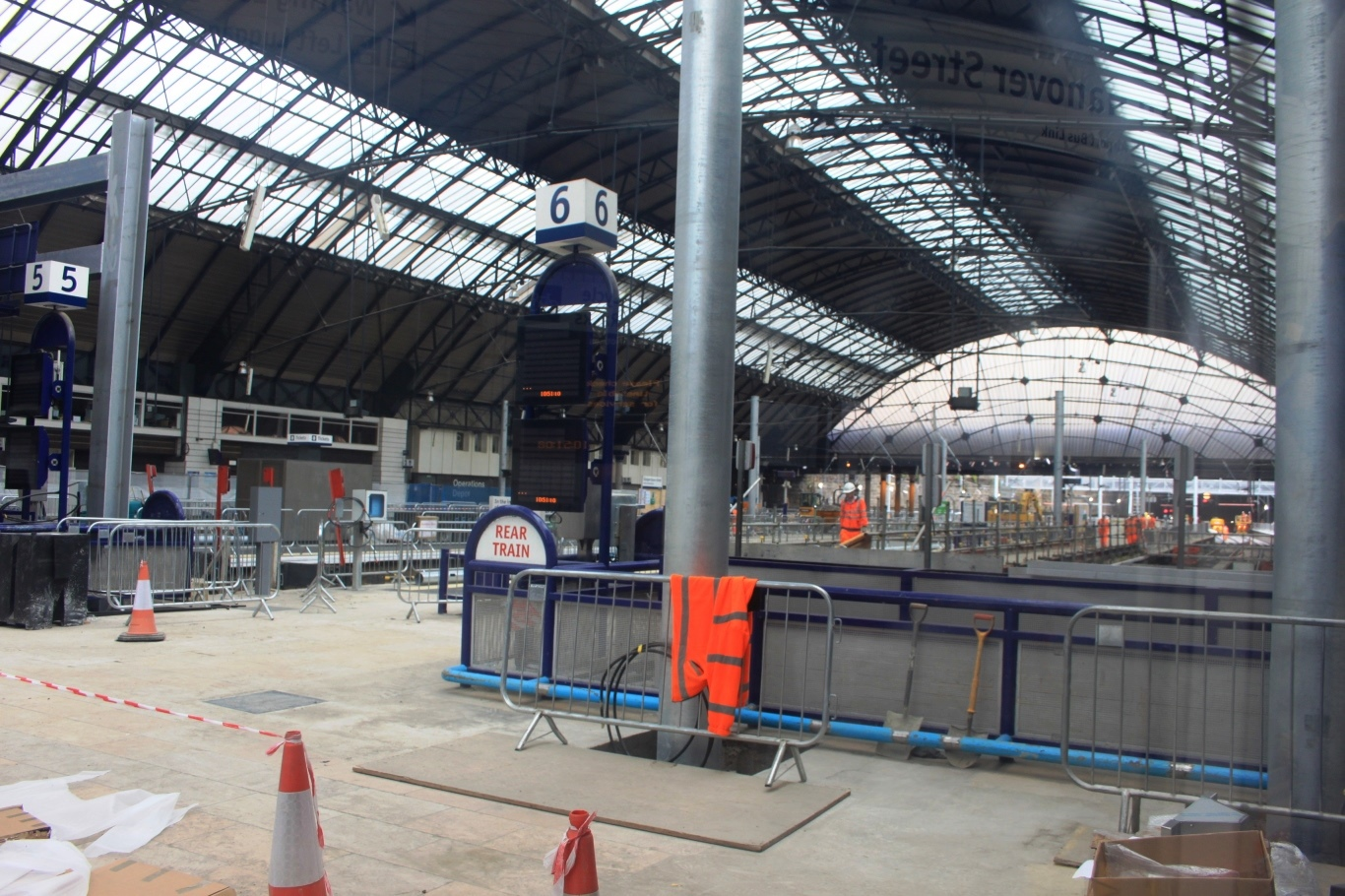
Glasgow Queen Street high level under engineering possession for electrification

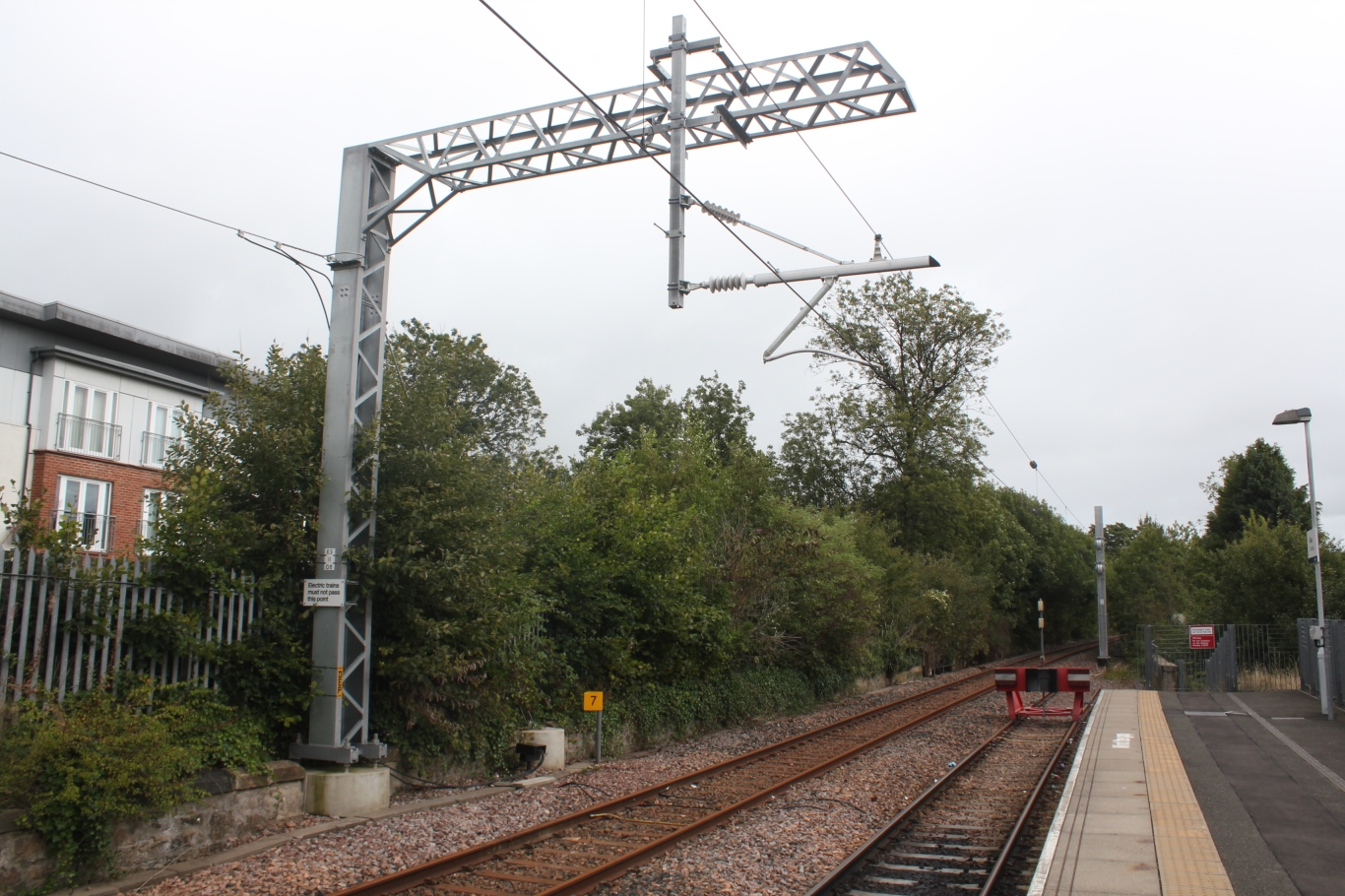
Alloa station - electric trains stop here sign visible- shortly after electrification

== See also ==
- Airdrie–Bathgate rail link
- Campaign to Electrify Britain's Railway
- Glasgow Airport Rail Link
- History of rail transport in Great Britain 1995 to date
- List of proposed railway electrification routes in Great Britain
- Great Western Main Line upgrade
- Midland Main Line railway upgrade
- North West England electrification schemes
- Overhead line
- Transpennine Route Upgrade
- Transport in Scotland
- West Coast Main Line route modernisation
