= THT =

THT may refer to:

== Science and technology ==
- tetrahydrothiophene, an organosulfur compound
- through-hole technology, in electronics manufacturing

== Sport ==
- Talen Horton-Tucker (fl. since 2017), American basketball player
- The Hardball Times, a baseball news website since 2004

== Transport ==
- Thorntonhall railway station, Scotland, by GBR code
- Tamchakett Airport, Mauritania, by IATA code

== Other uses ==
- Terrence Higgins Trust, a British sexual health charity, founded 1982
- The History Teacher, a quarterly journal since 1940
