= Thorntonhall =

Coordinates: 55°46′10″N 4°14′53″W

Thorntonhall: Scottish Gaelic: Dail Bhaile Dhealgaiche; Scots: Thorntounhauch
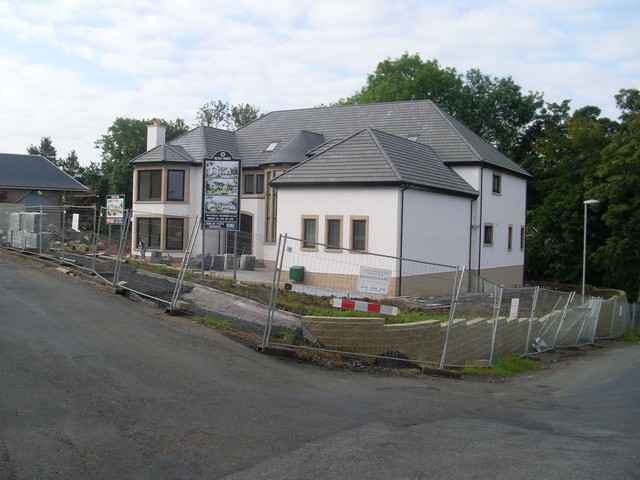

- Location within South Lanarkshire Thorntonhall (South Lanarkshire)
- Area: 0.72 km^{2} (0.28 sq mi)
- Population: 660 (2020)
  - Density: 917/km^{2} (2,380/sq mi)
- OS grid reference: NS5898755186
  - Edinburgh: 43 mi (69 km)
  - London: 339 mi (546 km)
- Council area: South Lanarkshire
- Lieutenancy area: Lanarkshire
- Country: Scotland
- Sovereign state: United Kingdom
- Post town: Glasgow
- Postcode district: G74
- Dialling code: 0141
- Police: Scotland
- Fire: Scottish
- Ambulance: Scottish
- UK Parliament: East Kilbride and Strathaven
- Scottish Parliament: East Kilbride

Thorntonhall (Scots: Thorntounhauch, Scottish Gaelic: Dail Bhaile Dhealgaiche) is an affluent village in South Lanarkshire, Scotland, lying around 6 miles (10 km) to the south of Glasgow, and around 2 1/2 miles (4 km) west of East Kilbride. The village lies just east of the boundary of East Renfrewshire, close to Waterfoot and Jackton.

In 2011, a street in Thorntonhall (Bowmore Crescent) was identified as having one of the most expensive average house prices within the Scottish property market, with an average house price of £908,000.

== History ==
Thorntonhall has a history reflecting the social changes of the last 400 years and in particular the last 120 years. It was originally just a farm that had added to it some major buildings. The then 'hall' was bought and greatly improved by a grocer called Cooper who had shops throughout the west of Scotland. Another grand house was built at Ravenscroft, again on a small hilltop. These two and the railway station were probably the catalyst for a great plan to build a mini-Edinburgh-style suburb of crescents and avenues. Only three houses were completed before the outbreak of World War I halted further development.

Before and during World War II Thorntonhall was one of the sites selected for relocation of government departments to avoid bombing raids. After the war it became part of the East Kilbride New town and this led to the construction of a large number of individual houses in this free standing village. That relative isolation led to an Upper Class housing development on a small scale throughout the period 1970 to 2000.

== Demographics ==
The population of Thorntonhall is estimated, as of 2016, at 590. The majority of residents own their own property, and annual incomes are well above average.

In 2002, Thorntonhall was named the wealthiest town in the United Kingdom.

== Country Club ==
Thorntonhall has a country club which is located in the centre of the village. The clubhouse itself has catering facilities, a dining room and a members' lounge.

== Transport ==
=== Road ===
The A727 bypasses the village.

=== Rail ===
The village is served by Thorntonhall railway station, which has hourly services to East Kilbride and Glasgow Central.

== Notable residents ==
- Andy Cameron, comedian
- Fred MacAulay, comedian
- Peter Lawwell, chief executive of Celtic
- Peter Løvenkrands, former footballer and coach for Rangers
- Aiden McGeady, footballer
- Michelle Mone, founder of Ultimo
- Chris Sutton, footballer
- Kira Eggers, Danish former model
