= Calderwood Glen Platform railway station =

Disused railway station in Scotland

Coordinates: 55.7847°N 4.1367°W

Calderwood Glen Platform
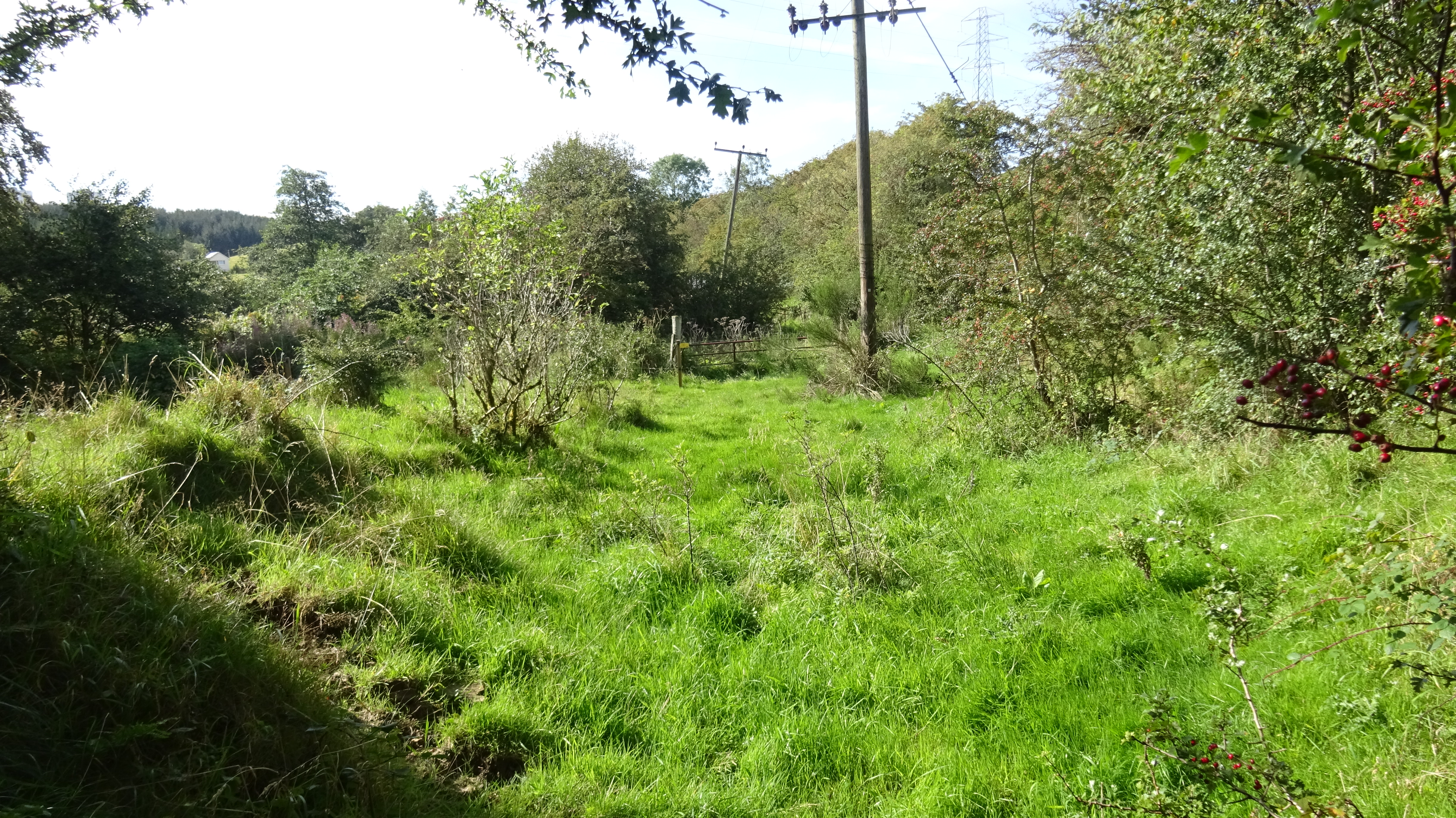
- Site of the Calderwood Glen Platform

General information
- Location: East Kilbride; Scotland
- Grid reference: NS661566
- Platforms: 1

Other information
- Status: Disused

History
- Pre-grouping: Caledonian Railway
- Post-grouping: London, Midland and Scottish Railway

Key dates
- 1907: Station opens
- September 1939: Station closes

Calderwood Glen Platform railway station was a public and an excursion platform on the Blantyre and East Kilbride Branch of the Caledonian Railway which ran from East Kilbride to Hunthill Junction at High Blantyre. Opened in 1907 served by trains between East Kilbride and Blantyre until 1924 and after used as an excursion platform for the Calderwood Estate pleasure grounds until closure in 1939 due to war time shortages.

== History ==
The line to East Kilbride was opened in 1868 as part of the Busby Railway, operated by the Caledonian Railway Company from Glasgow via Busby which was a spur from the Glasgow to Barrhead railway at Pollokshaws. In 1888 the line was extended eastwards to meet the Hamilton and Strathaven Railway at Hunthill Junction near High Blantyre (a locality which had a station, but just south of the junction meaning the new connecting line did not stop there) via an intermediate halt at Calderwood Glen with a timetabled services until 1924.

A triangular junction existed at Hunthill where the Strathaven line joined, then the line proceeded towards Auchinraith Junction where it joined the surviving Hamiton – Blantyre section of line. The East Kilbride and Blantyre extension never saw a great deal of traffic and passenger services were withdrawn during the 1914–18 war, with complete closure coming about as a result of WWII war shortages, after which the line was cut back to Nerston where it serviced local industries.

The Calderwood Estate, was taken over by the Scottish Co-operative Wholesale Society in 1904 for fruit growing. The estate was previously owned by the Maxwell of Calderwood family. The estate and its castle, now demolished, became an early example of a country park, albeit non-statutory, and the station was built to serve it. Calderwood Glen was opened as a pleasure ground and Calderwood Castle was used as the Co-operative Society museum for a short time, but more lastingly as a co-operative venue, and from 1914-1918 the building housed Belgian refugees.

=== Infrastructure ===
The station was located on the south-western side of the single track line with a single name board 'Calderwoodglen' supported on old rails, a plain wooden fence, one wooden platform surfaced with grit, with a small shelter at the northern end, but with no lighting. It lay to the east of the railway overbridge and a path from the road through an old quarry led to the platform and its shelter. No sidings or goods facilities were present and no signalling.

=== Remains on site ===
The railway bridge on the line towards East Kilbride has been removed however the railway embankment and stone bridge pillars still survive. Nothing survives at the platform however the entrance path through an old quarry remains and the gate onto the road is still present.

== Notes ==
Preceding station	Disused railways	Following station
East Kilbride	Caledonian Railway; Blantyre and East Kilbride Branch	Blantyre
