= Busby railway station =

Railway station in East Renfrewshire, Scotland

Busby
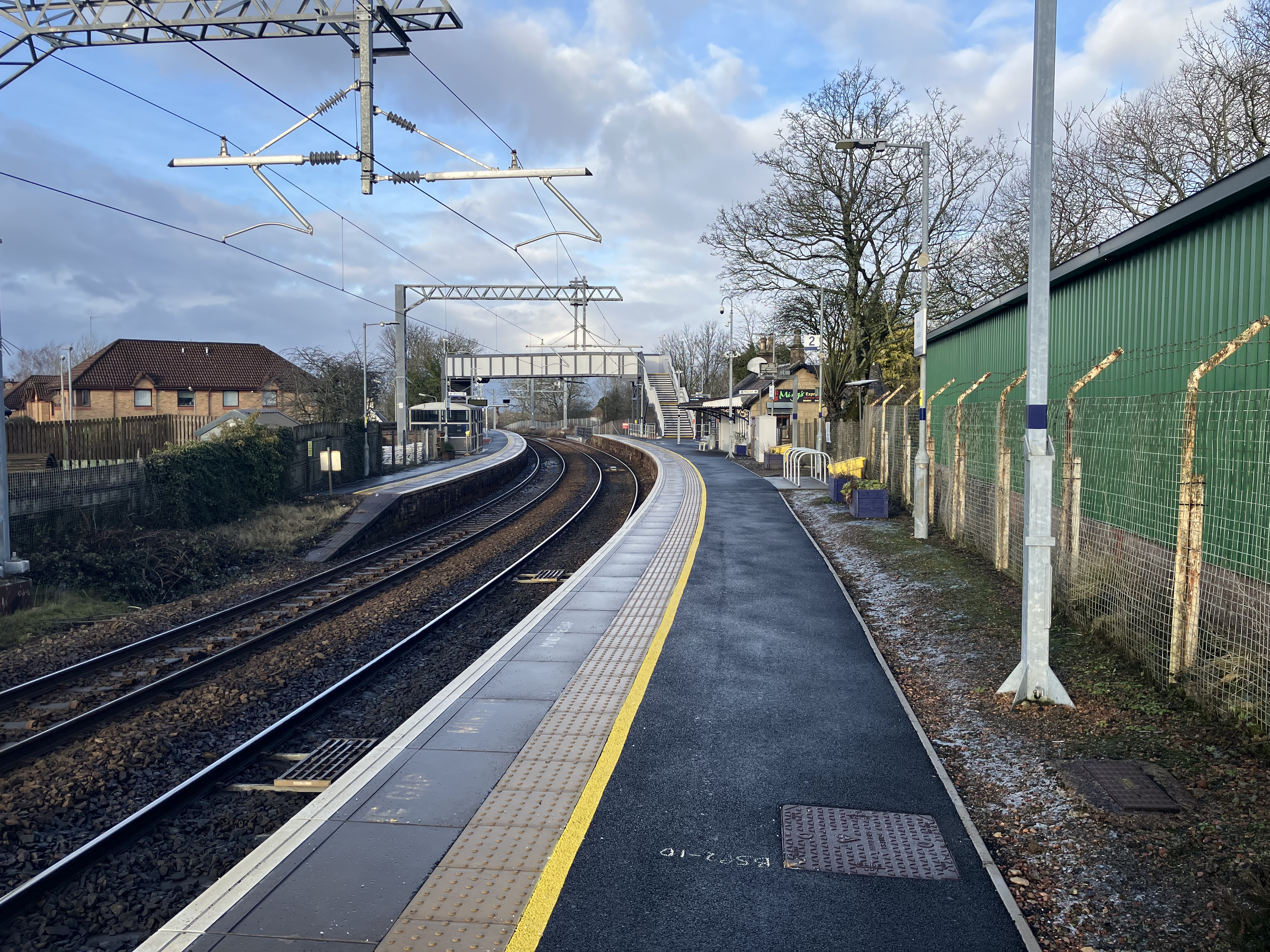

General information
- Location: Busby, East Renfrewshire; Scotland
- Coordinates: 55.7805°N 4.2623°W
- Grid reference: NS582564
- Managed by: ScotRail
- Platforms: 2

Other information
- Station code: BUS

History
- Original company: Busby Railway
- Pre-grouping: Caledonian Railway
- Post-grouping: LMS

Key dates
- 1 January 1866: Opened

Passengers
- 2020/21: ▼23,424 (Note: Impacted by the COVID-19 lockdown in the United Kingdom)
- 2021/22: ▲82,968
- 2022/23: ▲0.105 million
- 2023/24: ▲0.136 million
- 2024/25: ▼0.110 million (Note: Impacted due to January-May closure for electrification)
Location
Notes
- Passenger statistics from the Office of Rail and Road

Busby railway station is a railway station serving the village of Busby, East Renfrewshire. The station is managed by ScotRail and is on the East Kilbride–Glasgow Central line.

== History ==
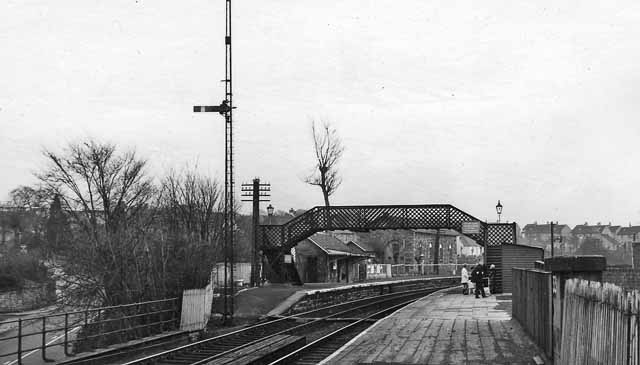
Busby station in 1970

The station was opened by the Busby Railway on 1 January 1866.

The 1914 edition of the Ordnance Survey map shows that there was once a goods yard immediately south-east of the present station. There was also a goods line (identified as a 'mineral railway') that branched southwards off the main line immediately south of Busby Station. It passed through the area now occupied by housing on Westerton Avenue and then swung south-westwards through what is currently woodland and a walkway. The line then terminated in a goods yard, which was located in the modern-day Field Road Industrial Estate.

There was also a station building on the down (Glasgow bound) line, but it was destroyed by fire in 1965.

The line reduces from double to single track just to the east of the station, remaining single all the way to the terminus except for a passing loop near Hairmyres. Signalling control is now handled by the West of Scotland SCC at Cowlairs, which replaced the former Glasgow Central signalling centre in 2008.

The railway line was closed for electrification for four months in 2025. As part of the works, a new much larger footbridge was installed at Busby, alongside the replacement of the bridge deck over the A727.

== Services ==
The station has a daily (including Sundays) half-hourly service in each direction; to Glasgow Central and to East Kilbride. A few extra trains operate at weekday peak times.

Preceding station	National Rail	Following station
Thorntonhall	ScotRail; East Kilbride–Glasgow Central line	Clarkston
Hairmyres	ScotRail; East Kilbride–Glasgow Central line	Clarkston
	Historical railways	
Thorntonhall; Line and station open	Caledonian Railway; Busby Railway	Clarkston; Line and station open
