= Giffnock railway station =

Railway station in East Renfrewshire, Scotland

Giffnock Scottish Gaelic: Giofnag
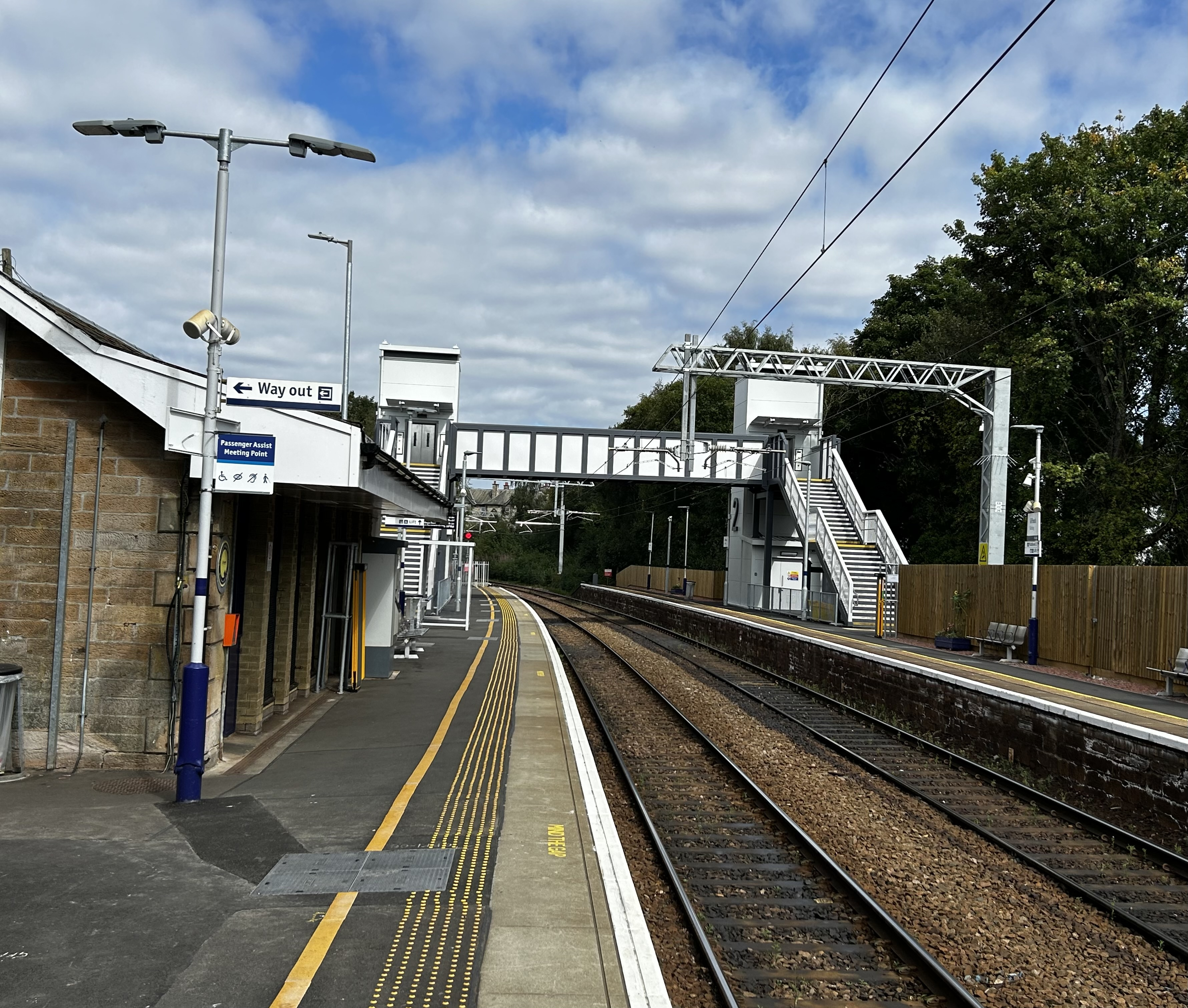
- The station after electrification works (2025)

General information
- Location: Giffnock, East Renfrewshire; Scotland
- Coordinates: 55.8039°N 4.2930°W
- Grid reference: NS563591
- Manager: ScotRail
- Platforms: 2

Other information
- Station code: GFN

History
- Original company: Busby Railway
- Pre-grouping: Caledonian Railway
- Post-grouping: LMS

Key dates
- 1 January 1866: Opened

Passengers
- 2020/21: ▼49,824 (Note: Impacted by the COVID-19 lockdown in the United Kingdom)
- 2021/22: ▲0.178 million
- 2022/23: ▲0.232 million
- 2023/24: ▲0.314 million
- 2024/25: ▼0.235 million (Note: Impacted due to January-May closure for electrification)
Location
Notes
- Passenger statistics from the Office of Rail and Road

Giffnock railway station is a railway station serving the town of Giffnock, East Renfrewshire. The station is managed by ScotRail and is on the East Kilbride–Glasgow Central line. The station was closed for four months for modernisation works to commence.

== History ==
The station was opened by the Busby Railway on 1 January 1866.

=== Upgrade works ===
In March 2023, piling work began for the line to be electrified. The station had a proposed plan that showed Giffnock would become a station that could be accessible by wheelchair users. The 1860s red footbridge was replaced by a sleek new design with lifts, and new stairs were constructed.

=== Post Electrification ===
Following a completion of works, the station reopened with a new bridge with lifts. The entire length of platform 1 was demolished and rebuilt. Large amounts of Vegetation were also cut behind platform 2 and a high wooden fence was built.

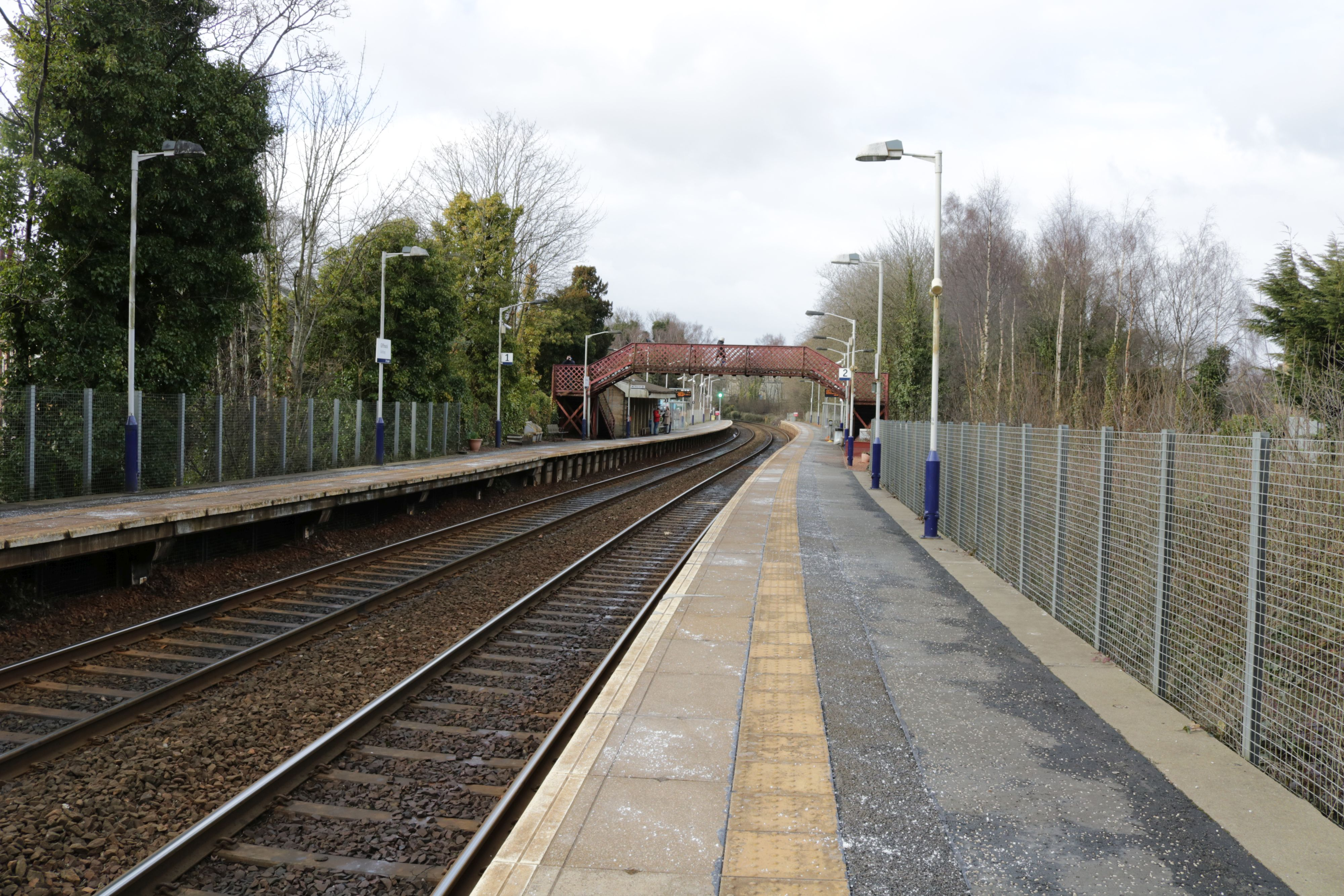
The station before electrification, with the original footbridge (2018)

== Location ==
The station is located in the town centre of Giffnock. The station has a large car park servicing it that it shares with Giffnock Library. The station is located on Station Road and has a footbridge crossing the line that also serves as access from Giffnock's eastern areas to the town centre, as it is the only access across the line in this area. The station has 2 platforms. The western platform is for trains to Glasgow Central and the eastern one for trains to East Kilbride. The next station towards Glasgow is Thornliebank and the next station toward East Kilbride is Clarkston.

== Services ==
The station has a half-hourly service in each direction (including Sundays) to Glasgow Central and East Kilbride. Express trains also use the line, but they don't stop at Giffnock; the nearest station they stop at is Clarkston. 75% of the services are powered with overhead line power and are operated by Class 380 locomotives and the rest being operated by British Rail Class 156.

Preceding station	National Rail	Following station
Clarkston	ScotRail; East Kilbride–Glasgow Central line	Thornliebank
	Historical railways	
Clarkston; Line and station open	Caledonian Railway; Busby Railway	Thornliebank; Line and station open
