= Thorntonhall railway station =

Railway station in South Lanarkshire, Scotland

Thorntonhall
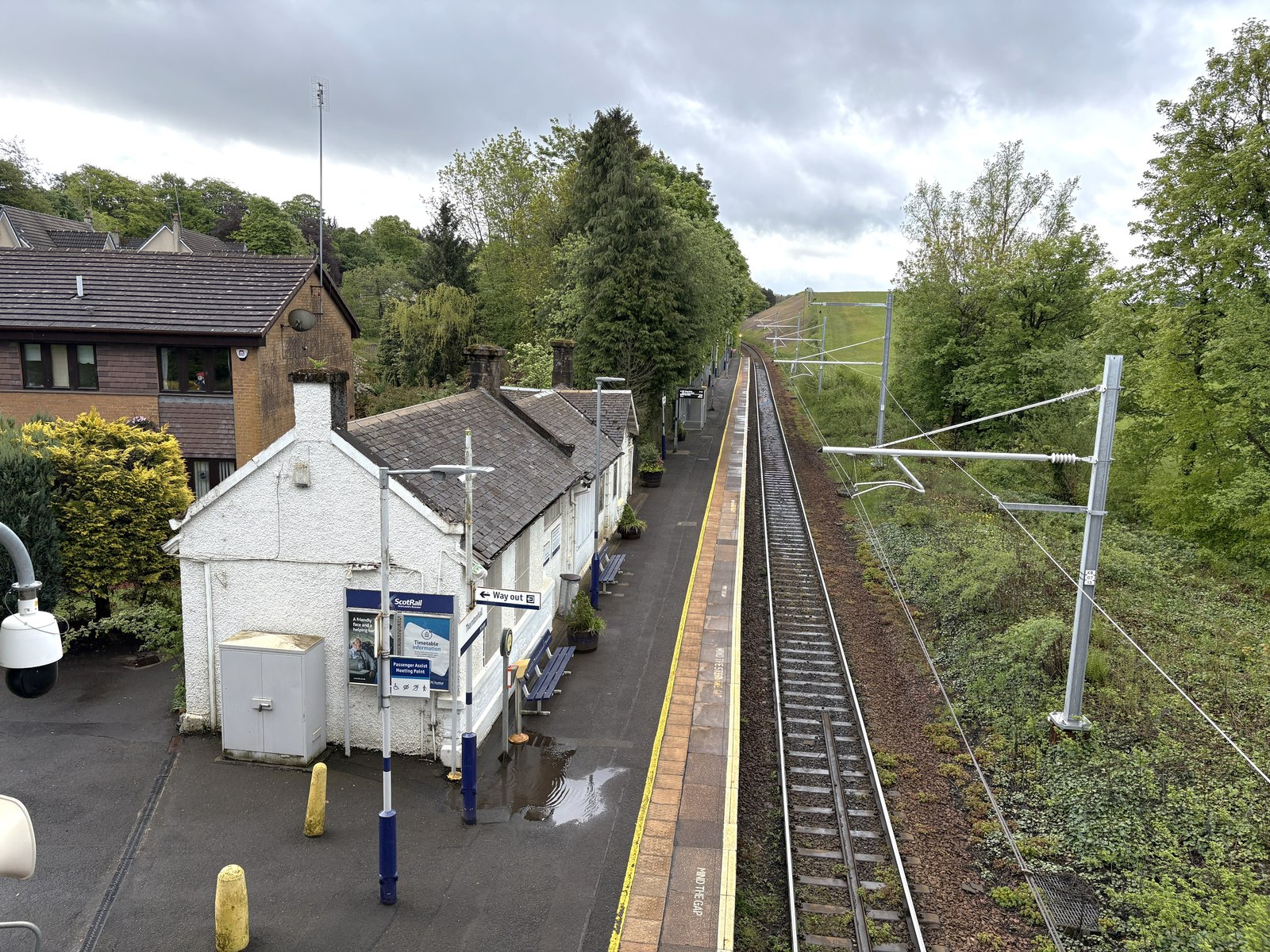

General information
- Location: Thorntonhall, South Lanarkshire; Scotland
- Coordinates: 55.7683°N 4.2506°W
- Grid reference: NS588551
- Manager: ScotRail
- Platforms: 1

Other information
- Station code: THT

History
- Original company: Busby Railway
- Pre-grouping: Caledonian Railway
- Post-grouping: LMS

Key dates
- 1 September 1868: Opened as Eaglesham Road
- 1 June 1877: Renamed Thornton Hall
- March 1944: Renamed

Passengers
- 2021/22: ▲11,130
- 2022/23: ▲14,880
- 2023/24: ▲19,642
- 2024/25: ▼18,166 (Note: Impacted due to January-May closure for electrification)
- 2025/26: ▼17,596
Location
Notes
- Passenger statistics from the Office of Rail and Road

Thorntonhall railway station is a railway station serving the village of Thorntonhall, South Lanarkshire. The station is managed by ScotRail and is located on the East Kilbride–Glasgow Central line. It is serviced hourly by ScotRail services with additional trains calling at weekday peak.

== History ==
In 1866, the Busby Railway was opened to exploit the Giffnock sandstone quarries and the Busby textile industry. Two years later, in 1868, the railway was extended to East Kilbride via Thorntonhall. The station in Thorntonhall was originally named 'Eaglesham Road'. At the beginning, the station was only open to mineral traffic in 1867, and later extended for passengers to use it in September 1868. Glasgow South Side, at Gushetfaulds, was a 30-minute journey from Thorntonhall.

Between January and May 2025, the railway line was closed for electrification, including platform extension works at Thorntonhall.

== Services ==
There is a daily (including Sundays) hourly service northbound to Glasgow Central and eastbound to East Kilbride.

Preceding station	National Rail	Following station
Hairmyres	ScotRail; East Kilbride–Glasgow Central line	Busby
	Historical railways	
Hairmyres; Line and station open	Caledonian Railway; Busby Railway	Busby; Line and station open

== Sources ==
- Butt, R. V. J. (October 1995). The Directory of Railway Stations: details every public and private passenger station, halt, platform and stopping place, past and present (1st ed.). Sparkford: Patrick Stephens Ltd. ISBN 978-1-85260-508-7. OCLC 60251199. OL 11956311M.
