= Clarkston railway station =

Railway station in East Renfrewshire, Scotland

Clarkston
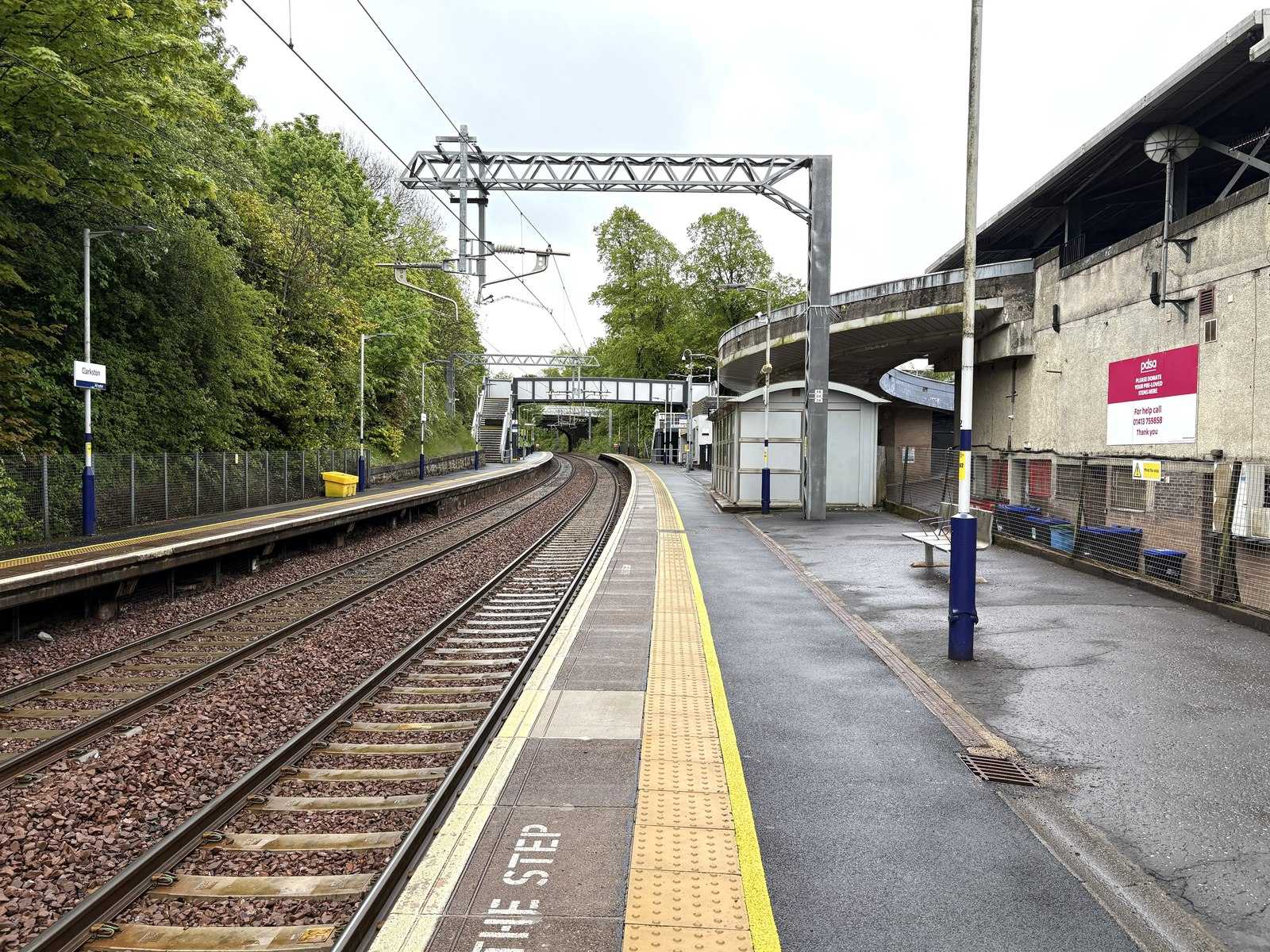
- The station in 2026

General information
- Location: Clarkston, East Renfrewshire; Scotland
- Coordinates: 55.7894°N 4.2755°W
- Grid reference: NS574574
- Managed by: ScotRail
- Platforms: 2

Other information
- Station code: CKS

History
- Original company: Busby Railway
- Pre-grouping: Caledonian Railway
- Post-grouping: LMS

Key dates
- 1 January 1866: Opened as Clarkston
- 5 May 1952: Renamed as Clarkston and Stamperland
- 7 May 1973: Renamed as Clarkston

Passengers
- 2020/21: ▼65,206 (Note: Impacted by the COVID-19 lockdown in the United Kingdom)
- 2021/22: ▲0.234 million
- 2022/23: ▲0.310 million
- 2023/24: ▲0.409 million
- 2024/25: ▼0.321 million (Note: Impacted due to January-May closure for electrification)
Location
Notes
- Passenger statistics from the Office of Rail and Road

Clarkston railway station is a railway station serving the town of Clarkston, East Renfrewshire. The station is managed by ScotRail and is on the East Kilbride–Glasgow Central line. It was opened in 1866 by the Busby Railway.

== History ==
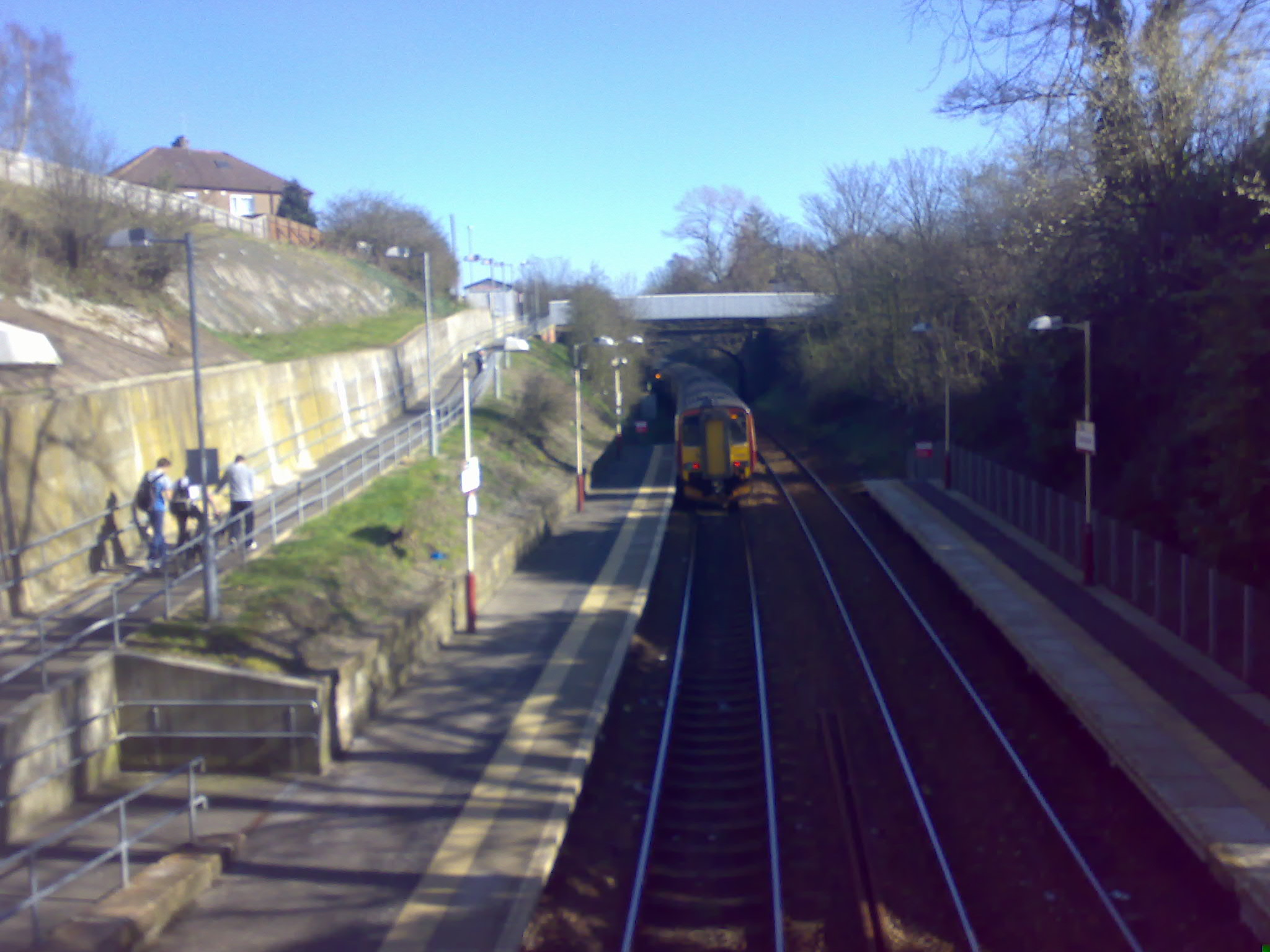
Easterly view from old footbridge, 2007

The station was opened by the Busby Railway on 1 January 1866. Services were subsequently extended through to East Kilbride by the Caledonian Railway two years later and eventually to High Blantyre (on the Hamilton and Strathaven Railway), though the section beyond East Kilbride later closed in the 1940s. A further pair of connections to the Lanarkshire and Ayrshire Railway (now the Neilston branch of the Cathcart Circle) were subsequently constructed between Clarkston and Giffnock stations around 1903-4 by the latter company, though only the south to west connection saw regular traffic and even then for just a few months.

There were historically two small spur sections of railway at Clarkston, one connecting to a large building where Clarkston's main row of shops was later constructed, and another to a goods yard, which was later converted into the Goods Yard Car Park.

Proposals put forward by British Rail in the early 1980s would have seen the former south to east curve reinstated to allow East Kilbride trains to be re-routed via Muirend, Cathcart and Mount Florida to Glasgow Central. The scheme would have seen the branch electrified but the section between the curve and Busby Junction would have been closed, including Giffnock and Thornliebank stations. The plans were not well received and were eventually dropped.

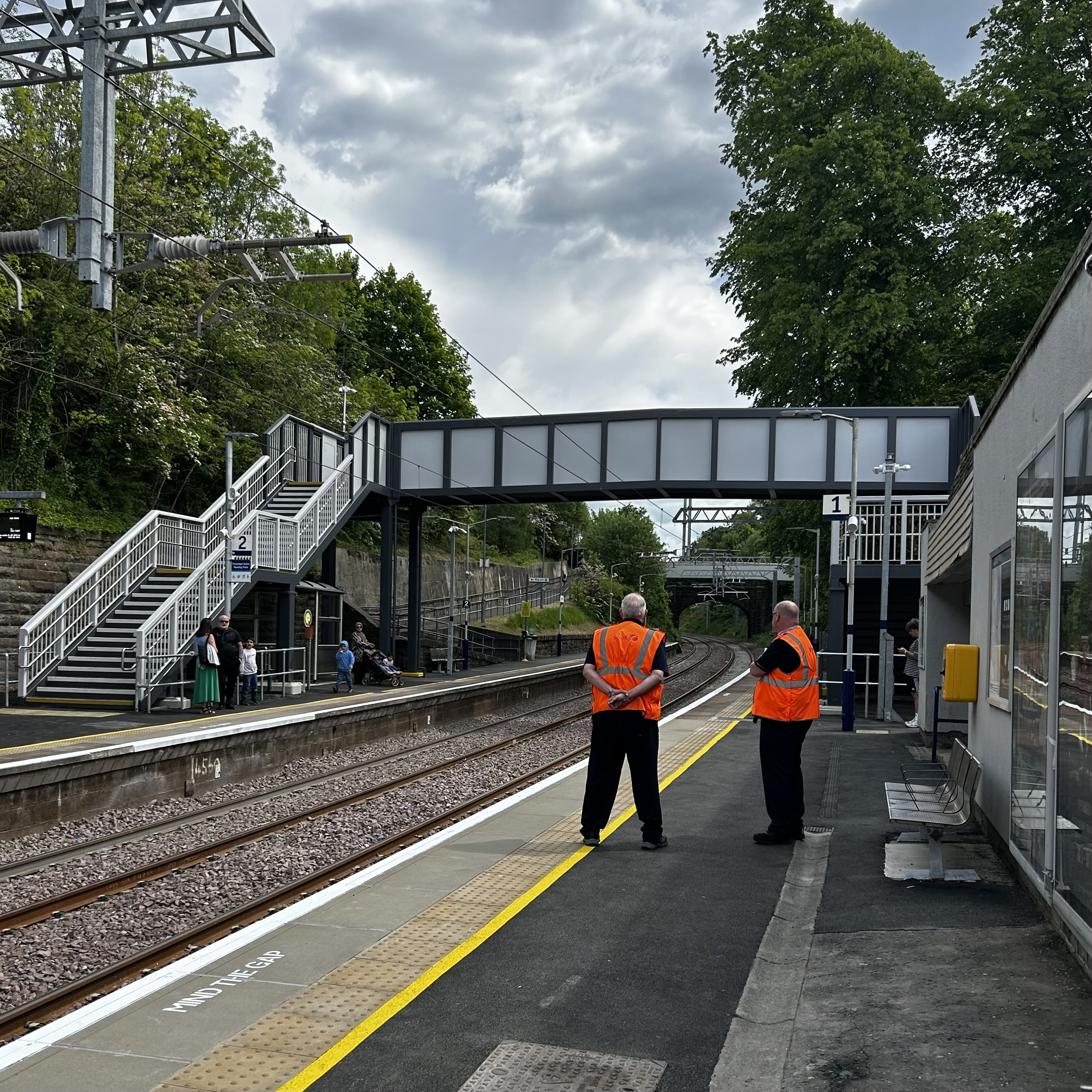
Clarkston pictured during electrification works in 2025

Between January and May 2025, the railway line, including Clarkston, was closed as part of £140 million works to electrify the line. As part of the project, a replacement footbridge was installed at Clarkston, alongside a new pedestrian access route to the Goods Yard Car Park.

== Services ==
The station has a half-hourly service in each direction (including Sundays) to Glasgow Central and East Kilbride.

Preceding station	National Rail	Following station
Busby	ScotRail; East Kilbride–Glasgow Central line	Giffnock
	Historical railways	
Busby; Line and station open	Caledonian Railway; Busby Railway	Giffnock; Line and station open
