= East Kilbride–Glasgow Central line =

Railway between East Kilbride and Glasgow Central

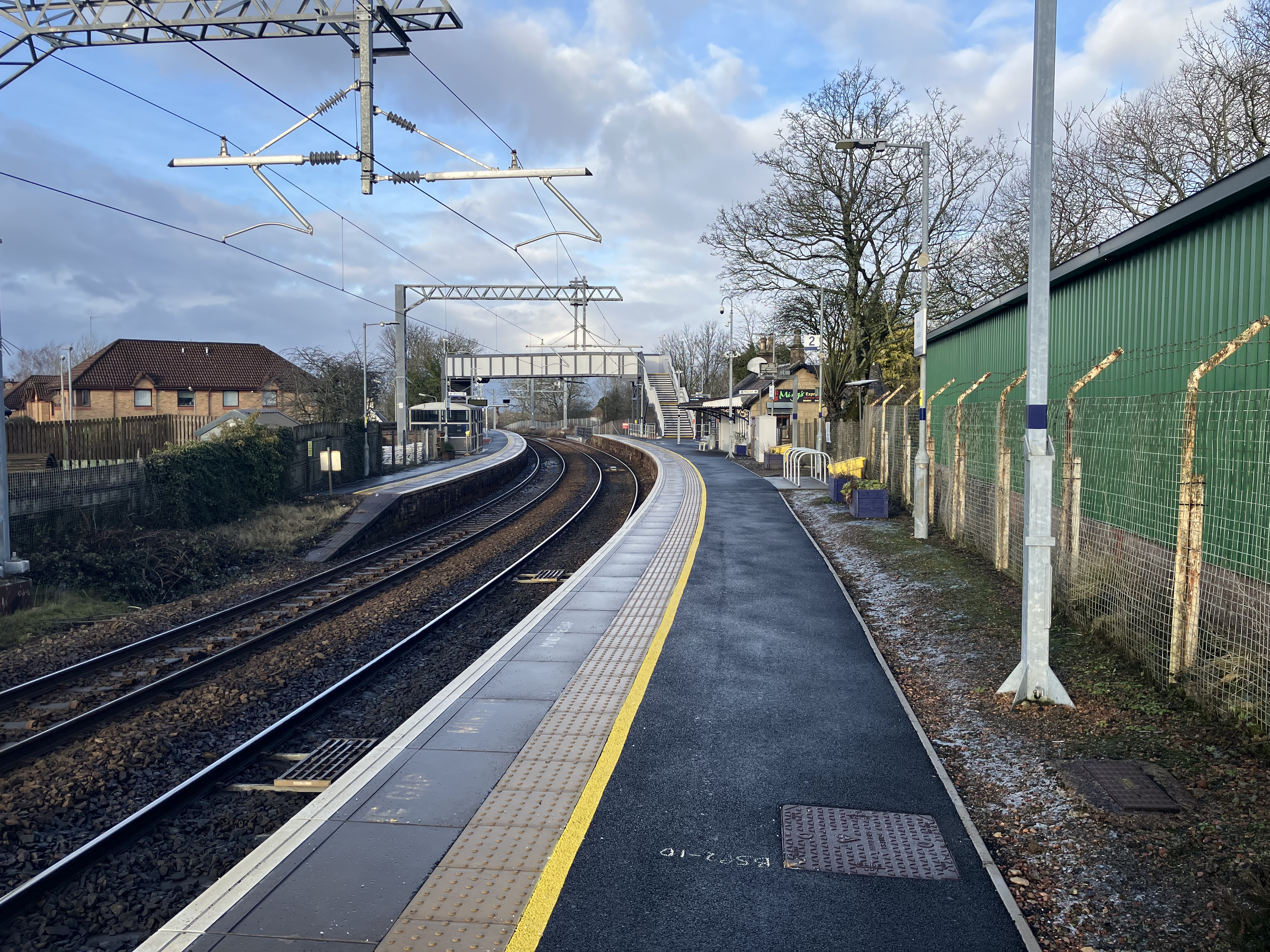
- Busby railway station in 2026, after the line was electrified

Overview
- Other name: Busby Railway
- Status: Operational
- Locale: Glasgow, Scotland
- Termini: Glasgow Central; East Kilbride
- Stations: 10

Service
- Operator(s): ScotRail
- Rolling stock: Class 380 Desiro; Class 156 Super Sprinter

History
- Completed: 1868

Technical
- Number of tracks: 1–2
- Track gauge: 4 ft 8 1/2 in (1,435 mm) standard gauge
- Electrification: 25 kV OHLE
A map of the Busby Railway when it opened in 1868
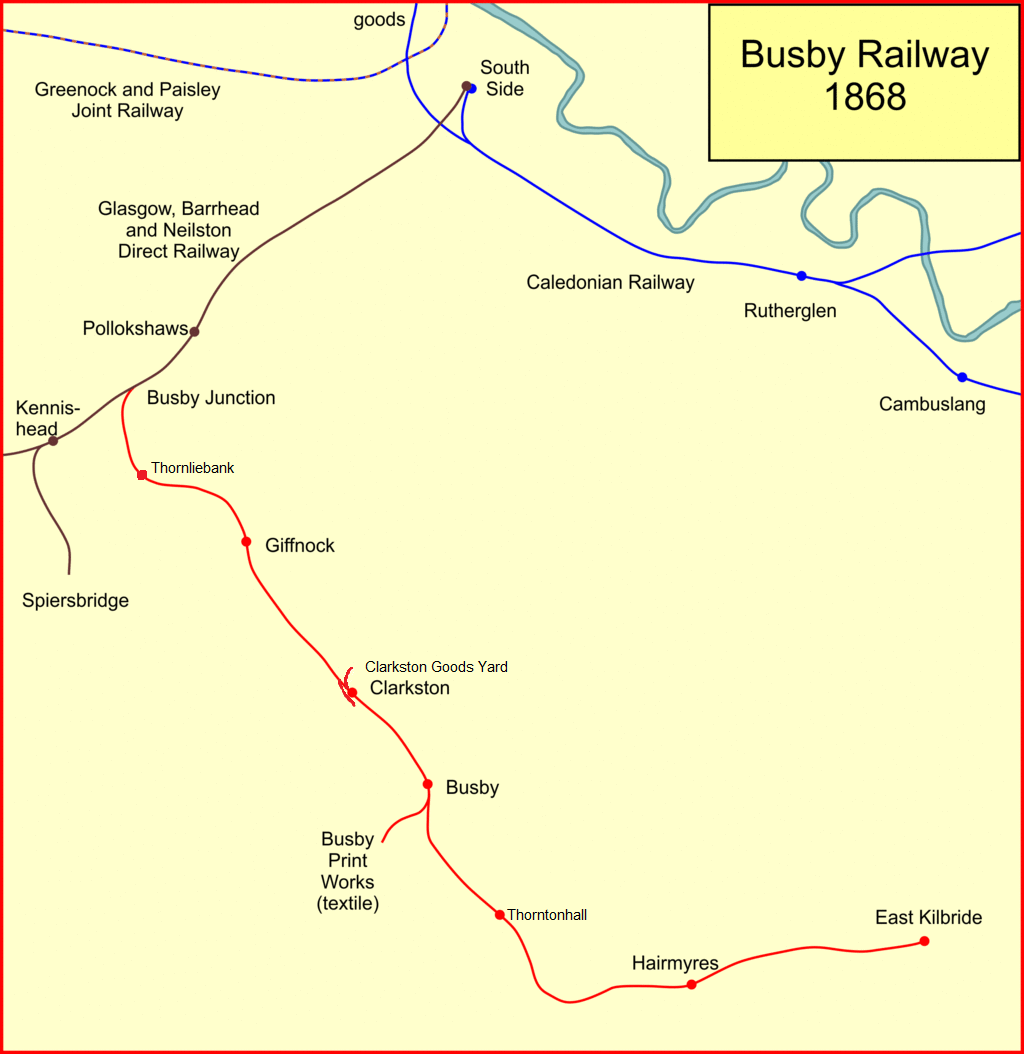

The East Kilbride–Glasgow Central line, historically known as the Busby Railway, is a branch line of the Glasgow South Western Line that runs between Pollokshaws West and East Kilbride. The line was first opened in two stages in 1866 and 1868; it was upgraded and electrified over a four month closure in 2025, reopening on 18 May. On 14 December 2025, Class 380 EMUs started operating on the line.

== Route ==
The line diverges from the Glasgow South Western Line at Busby Junction, between Pollokshaws West and Kennishead. The junction was also formerly known as Eglinton Street Junction. The line is double track until Busby, then single track until Hairmyres, before it redoubles until East Kilbride. The line is electrified with 25 kV AC OHLE. The maximum speed on the line is 50 mph (80 km/h).

=== Stations ===
The stations on the line, ordered from northwest to southeast are:

- Glasgow Central
- Crossmyloof
- Pollokshaws West
- Thornliebank
- Giffnock
- Clarkston
- Busby
- Thorntonhall
- Hairmyres
- East Kilbride

The line formerly extended beyond East Kilbride to Huntill Junction, where it joined the Argyle Line between Blantyre and Hamilton West. However, the line has since been cut back to East Kilbride, where it terminates today.

=== Clarkston curves ===
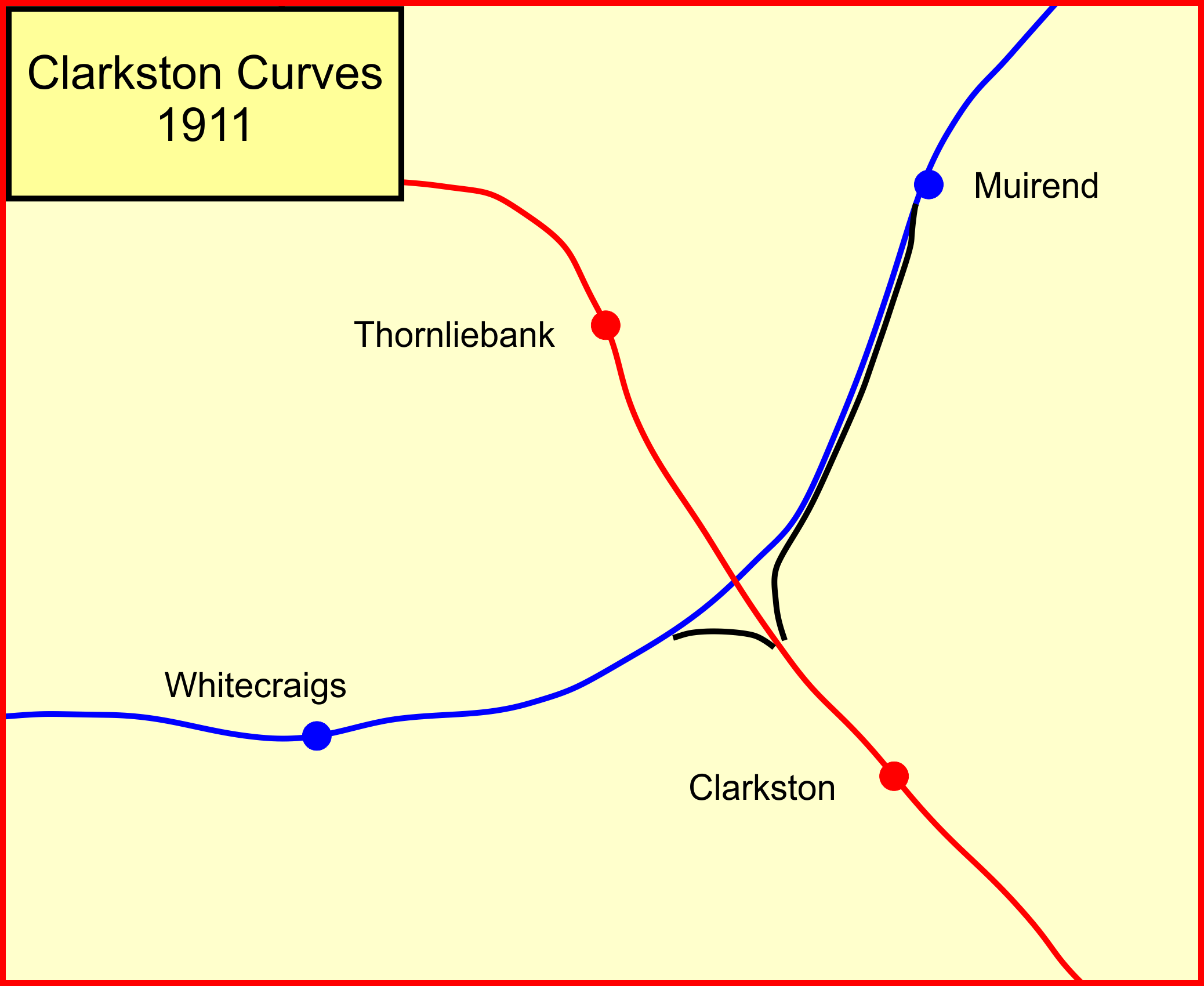
The Clarkston curves in 1911

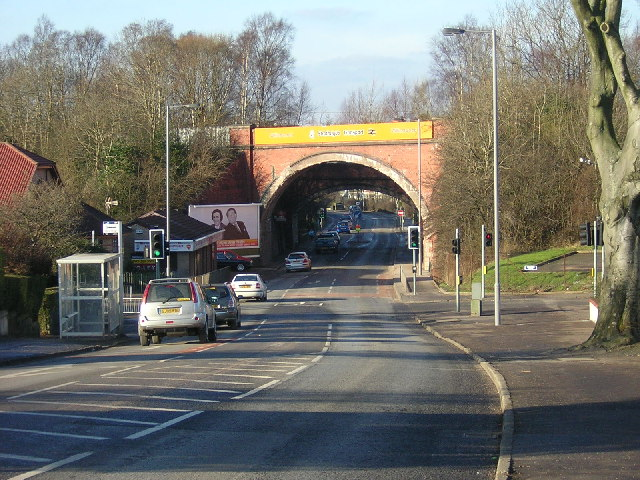
The disused railway bridge at Williamwood in 2006

Between Clarkston and Giffnock, the railway passes underneath the Cathcart Circle Lines between Muirend and Williamwood. There were formerly two curves of track which connected the two lines; the Clarkston West curve connected Clarkston and Williamwood and the Clarkston East curve connected Clarkston and Muirend. By 1967, only the West curve was still in use; it was still open in 1989 but has closed since. The Williamwood High Bridge, which used to carry the West Curve, is still in situ.

== History ==
Busby Railway Act 1863
- Act of Parliament
- Parliament of the United Kingdom
- Long title: An Act for making a Railway from the Glasgow, Barrhead, and Neilson Direct Railway to Busby, with a Branch to Busby Print Works, in the Counties of Renfrew and Lanark; and for other Purposes.
- Citation: 26 & 27 Vict. c. xxvi

Dates
- Royal assent: 11 May 1863

In the 1860s, developing residential areas outside the immediate conurbation of Glasgow began to emerge. Local people promoted a line to connect Busby to the growing Glasgow network, and on 11 May 1863 the Busby Railway obtained an authorising act of Parliament, the Busby Railway Act 1863 (26 & 27 Vict. c. xxvi), authorising capital of £36,000, equivalent to 3,911,000 in 2025. It was to run from a junction with the Glasgow, Barrhead and Neilston Direct Railway (GB&NDR) which at that time was leased to, and worked by, the Caledonian Railway. The line would be 3 miles 43 chains (3.54 miles, 5.69 km) in length. The speculative nature of the line was indicated in the prospectus, which described the area served as being ideal for villa residences: business people could live in rural surroundings and travel daily to their places of business in the City. There was also important quarrying activity in the area; their product was much in demand at the time; there were also textile mills in the area served.

The line opened on 1 January 1866, and the point of junction with the main line was named Busby Junction. Train services operated from the South Side station in Glasgow. There was a 1/2 mile (800 m) goods branch to a print works at Busby.

During the construction period the decision was taken to extend the line to the village of East Kilbride, at an additional cost of £45,000. The Caledonian Railway subscribed one-third of this sum. The extension was opened on 1 September 1868. In 1881 the line was doubled between Busby Junction and Busby.

On 18 July 1881 the Caledonian Railway (Additional Powers) Act 1881 (44 & 45 Vict. c. cxix) was passed authorising the Caledonian Railway to absorb the Busby Railway, and in December 1881 it was determined to buy out the remaining shareholders of the Busby Railway Company, and the line passed fully into Caledonian Railway ownership on 2 February 1882. The Caledonian Railway built a line eastwards from East Kilbride to join the Strathaven line near High Blantyre, where there was considerable mining activity; the intervening land was very thinly populated.

On 19 March 1883, the 18:15 passenger train from Glasgow Central to East Kilbridge was hit by another passenger train travelling from Edinburgh Waverley to Glasgow Central at Eglinton Street Junction, which was the name for Busby Junction at the time. In a report by Charles Scrope Hutchinson, the collision was deemed to be caused by the Edinburgh train passing a signal at danger. Four people were killed and fifty-three were injured in the accident.

When the Lanarkshire and Ayrshire Railway (L&AR) line was opened between Cathcart and Neilston in 1903 a south curve connection was built so that trains could run direct from Blantyre via East Kilbride and Neilston (High) to Ardrossan. The junction on the Busby line was Clarkston East Junction. The intention was to shorten the mileage for mineral trains, but this only lasted for nine months, until the opening of the section of the L&AR from Newton to Cathcart, when nearly all of the mineral traffic ran that way. The Clarkston curve then had very little traffic, and it was closed on 29 October 1907. Clarkston East Junction remained in use as a block post on the Busby line until 1930.

Around the end of the nineteenth century the industrial activity on the line declined, but residential travel increased considerably.

East Kilbride transformed from a village to a New Town from 1947 onward, and this gave new significance to the branch line. However the station, located to suit the core of the earlier village, was not well placed for the centre of the New Town, and there have been numerous initiatives to extend the railway accordingly. None of these have been implemented, and the dispersed nature of the community's housing, and changing travel habits, mean that the station serves better now as a railhead, than as a terminal to which people might walk. At present, there is no active proposal to extend.

The East Kilbride line was included for closure in the report The Reshaping of British Railways that led to the Beeching cuts of the 1960s. The significance of the line made it a surprising addition. In 1966, this was reversed as part of a plethora of improvements to the line by British Rail; starting on 18 April 1966, steam services were withdrawn in favour of diesel multiple units (DMUs), trains began terminating at Glasgow Central rather than St Enoch, the service was increased from 13 trains per day to 20, and the fares were decreased from 3s 3d (equivalent to £2.64 in 2025) to 1s 10d (equivalent to £1.49 in 2025) for a single fare.

In March 1967, the Glasgow–East Kilbride Railway Development Association created a ten-point proposal to improve the quality of the service on the East Kilbride line, which they calculated to cost £5,000,000 (equivalent to 80,000,000 in 2025); however, they also calculated the savings on road infrastructure projects as a result would be £7,500,000 (equivalent to 120,000,000 in 2025). The proposals included the complete electrification of the line, extension of the double track to Hairmyres, new stations at East Kilbride Town Centre, Nerston, and Long Calderwood. The proposal also included a new rail link between Clarkston and Muirend, which would fulfil the same purpose as the closed Clarkston East curve.

In August 1985, no trains ran on the line for two weeks due to guards' industrial action at the introduction of trains which only required a driver, making their job redundant. Of the 186 guards based at Glasgow Central that went on strike, 147 were fired after they had not returned to work by the official deadline.

=== East Kilbride Enhancement ===
As part of a Scottish Government investment, the line is in the process of being electrified and upgraded at a cost of £140 million. The purpose of the enhancement project has been cited to be increasing reliability on the line and contributing to the decarbonisation of Scotland's railways. This primarily occurred during a 16-week closure of the line between 25 January and 18 May 2025. During this time, no services ran on the line, however Network Rail provided rail replacement buses as an alternative. The project was completed in full in December 2025.

As part of the upgrade, the double-track was extended by 1.4 km (1,530 yd) between East Kilbride and Hairmyres, and 22 km (14 mi) of new overhead power cables have been installed. To accommodate the overhead line equipment, the existing track was also lowered underneath three bridges. New signalling systems were also installed on the line. The upgrade also includes major station works, including new stations at East Kilbride and Hairmyres; new footbridges have been built at Busby, Giffnock, and Clarkston, where a new station entrance was built and access to platform 2 was improved. The new station at Hairmyres is located 500 m (550 yd) west of the original site.

== Services ==
The initial passenger train service on the line was three trains each way with an extra train on Saturday. The trains used the GB&NDR terminus at Southside railway station in Glasgow. When that closed in 1877, the trains used Gorbals on the Glasgow, Barrhead and Kilmarnock Joint Railway extension to St Enoch as a temporary arrangement, until in June 1879 they transferred to the new Glasgow Central station, which had opened on 1 August 1879.

As of December 2025, the current service on the line is 2tph between Glasgow Central and East Kilbride; all services are operated by ScotRail. Services are predominantly operated by Class 380 EMUs, with some services being operated by Class 156 DMUs.
