= Hairmyres railway station =

Railway station in South Lanarkshire, Scotland

Hairmyres
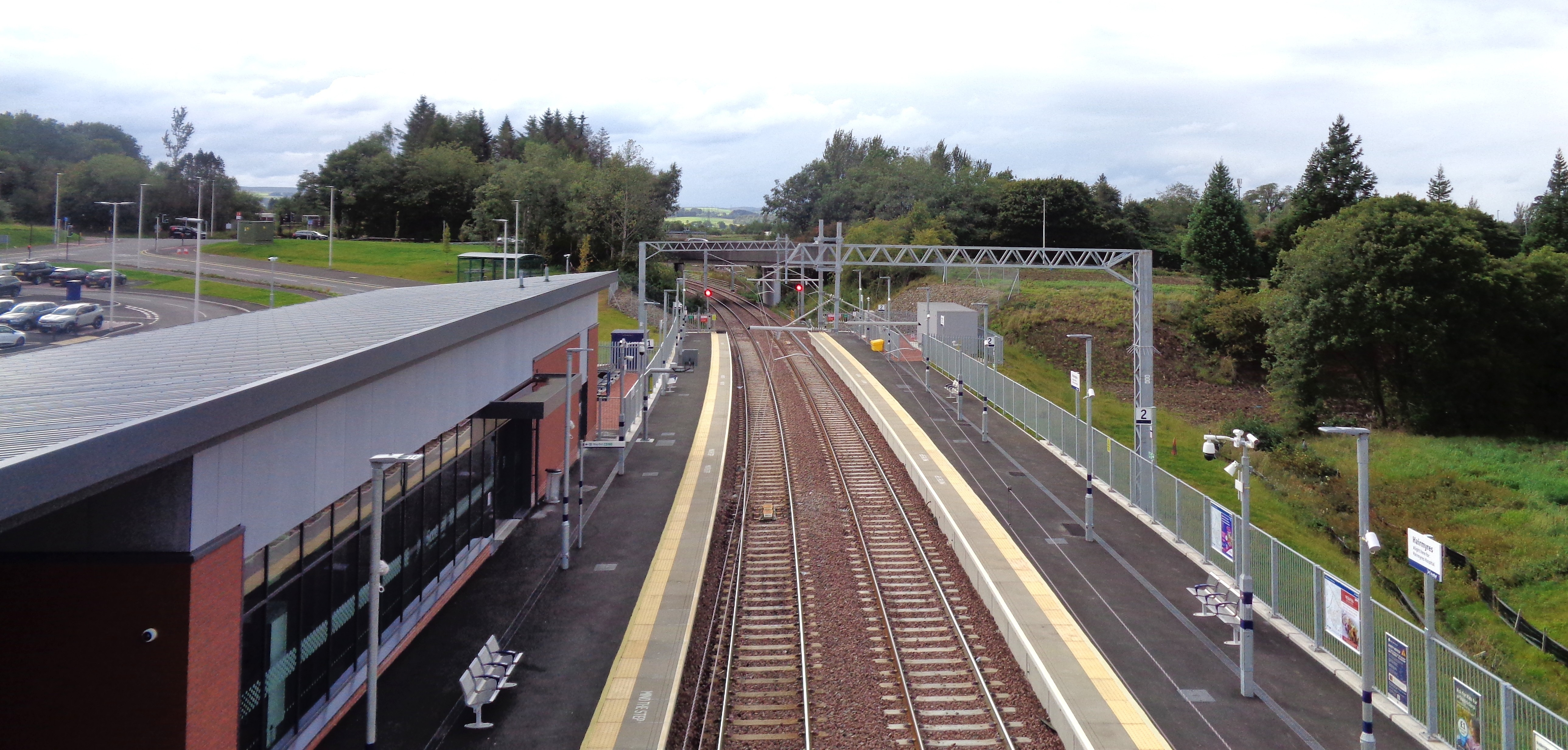
- The new station, looking west towards Thorntonhall

General information
- Location: East Kilbride, South Lanarkshire; Scotland
- Coordinates: 55.7618°N 4.2297°W
- Grid reference: NS608542
- Managed by: ScotRail
- Platforms: 2

Other information
- Station code: HMY

Key dates
- 1 September 1868: Opened
- 24 January 2025: Closed
- 18 May 2025: Reopened 600 m (660 yd) to the west

Passengers
- 2020/21: ▼97,650 (Note: Impacted by the COVID-19 lockdown in the United Kingdom)
- 2021/22: ▲0.309 million
- 2022/23: ▲0.410 million
- 2023/24: ▲0.519 million
- 2024/25: ▼0.436 million (Note: Impacted due to January-May closure for electrification)
Location
Notes
- Passenger statistics from the Office of Rail and Road

Hairmyres railway station is a railway station between the Hairmyres and Peel Park areas of East Kilbride, South Lanarkshire, Greater Glasgow, Scotland. The station is managed by ScotRail and is on the East Kilbride–Glasgow Central line.

The line was historically single-tracked through the station, with a passing loop approximately 398 metres (435 yd) east of Hairmyres Station, which extended for approximately 584 metres (639 yd) to Kirktonholme Road. It was crossed mid-loop by the A726 Queensway overbridge. Although the line was always single between Busby and East Kilbride, sidings existed to serve the former Radio Times factory in the College Milton Industrial Estate adjacent to the station. These were closed and lifted in the late 1960s. The Hairmyres Hospital and Department for International Development's office are located nearby.

In 2025, the station reopened at a new location, 600m to the west of its original site.

== History ==
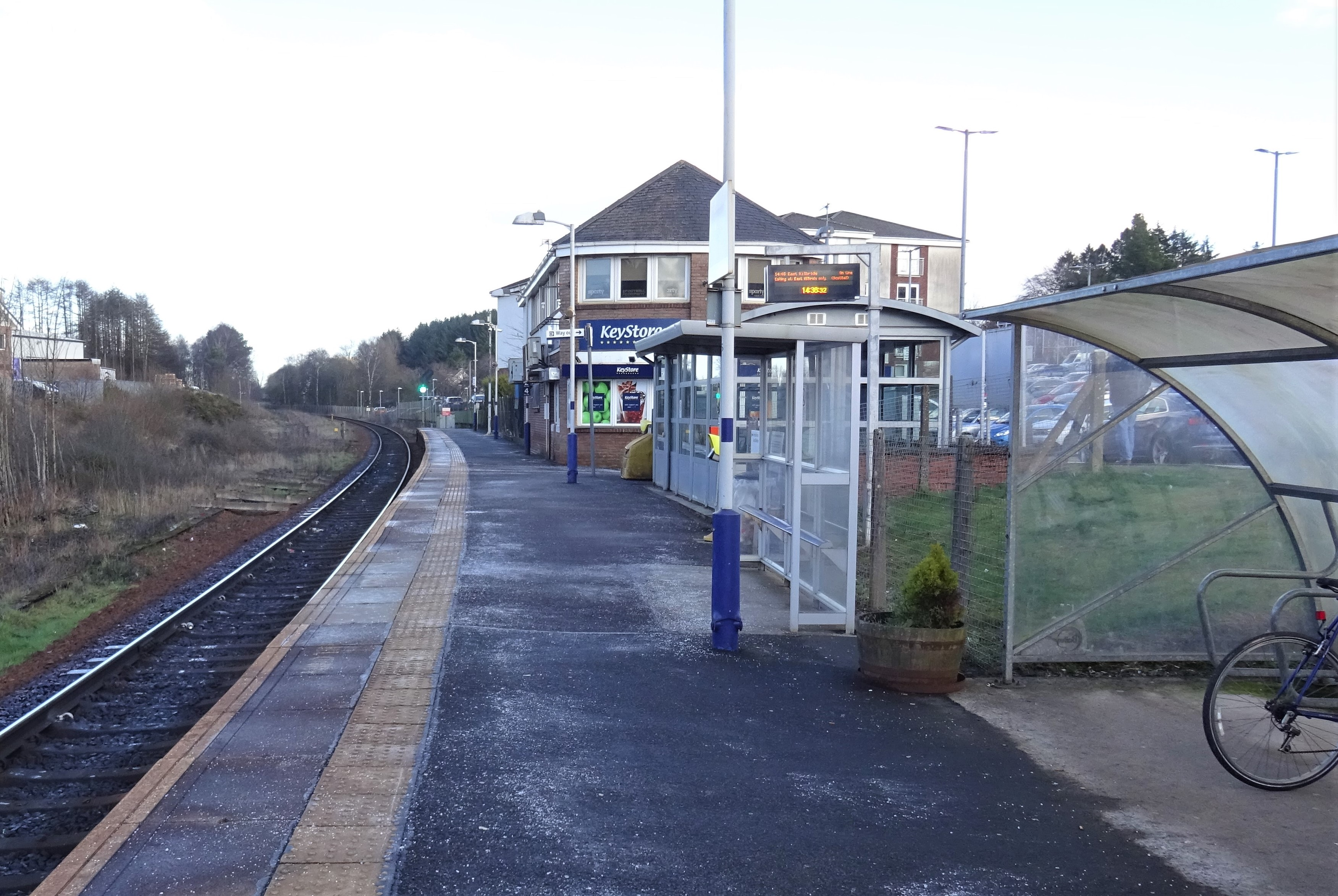
View from the old Hairmyres station towards East Kilbride, 2022

Up until the mid-1990s the area around the station was semi rural, but several new housing schemes were built into the mid-2000s, giving far increased patronage to the station.

The old station was unstaffed, but there was a ticket machine in the station's heated and seated modern waiting shelter. There were 86 parking spaces and 4 cycle lockers also available. The station was served by a small newsagents.

=== Reconstruction ===
In the 2020s, plans were introduced to relocate the station 600 metres (660 yd) west. Work began in January 2024, clearing the area in preparation for the two new platforms. In September 2024, the new footbridge and lifts were installed into place.

Between January and May 2025, the line between East Kilbride and Glasgow was closed as part of a £140m project to electrify the line. As part of the work, in addition to the completion of the new station, the double-track between East Kilbride and Hairmyres was extended, now encompassing both old and new Hairmyres stations, while the lines were closed. The contractor for the new station was AmcoGiffen. The previous Hairmyres station closed in January 2025, and the new station opened on 18 May 2025.

== Facilities ==
The station is open 24 hours a day (although trains only run through it for around 18 hours a day).

== Services ==
The station has a daily half-hourly service, served by Class 380 EMUs and Class 156 DMUs, in each direction northbound to Glasgow Central and southbound to East Kilbride. The first train going to Glasgow Central is at 06:21 on weekdays, with the last train from East Kilbride to Glasgow at 23:59. Going from Glasgow to East Kilbride, the first and last trains are at 06:41 and 00:47 respectively.

Preceding station	National Rail	Following station
East Kilbride	ScotRail; Glasgow South Western Line; East Kilbride branch	Thorntonhall or Busby
