= Busby, East Renfrewshire =

Village in East Renfrewshire, Scotland

Coordinates: 55.781834°N 4.267349°W

Busby
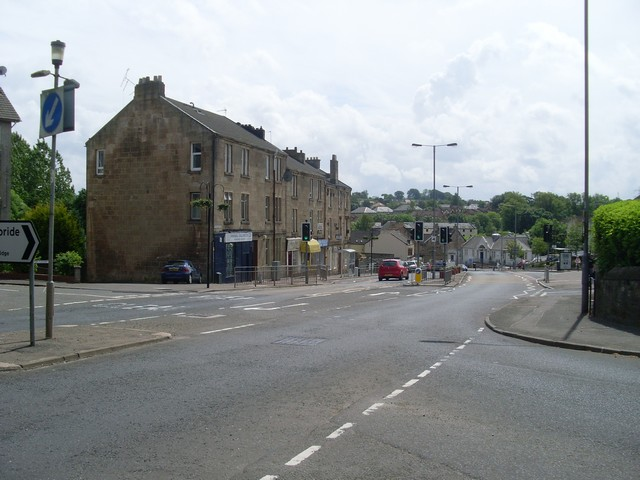
- Main Street in 2009

- Location within East Renfrewshire Busby (East Renfrewshire)
- Population: 3,310 (2020)
- Community council: Busby
- Council area: East Renfrewshire
- Lieutenancy area: Renfrewshire
- Country: Scotland
- Sovereign state: United Kingdom
- Post town: GLASGOW
- Postcode district: G76
- Dialling code: 0141
- Police: Scotland
- Fire: Scottish
- Ambulance: Scottish
- UK Parliament: East Renfrewshire
- Scottish Parliament: Eastwood

Busby is a village in East Renfrewshire, Scotland. Busby is in the Greater Glasgow urban area, but is administratively separate from Glasgow. It lies on the White Cart Water six miles (ten kilometres) south of Glasgow city centre and 3/4 mile (1.2 kilometres) northwest of the outskirts of East Kilbride. It directly adjoins the town of Clarkston, with which the village is closely associated.

== History ==
As a settlement, Busby dates back at least 700 years. Historically, the village was called Bushby. Its modern origins may be dated to several significant changes in the 1780s.

The first big change was in the landscape. Until the 1780s, Busby village consisted of a scatter of cottages along a track leading from Carmunnock to Mearns. This route forded the River Cart near Newford.

This original village or fermtoun was in the area of the present Busby railway station. For centuries, the occupants had worked the surrounding land from this central settlement. However, by the 1780s the landowner was in process of sweeping away the old fermtoun. The occupants were moved to the newly established farmsteads of Easter Busby, Wester Busby, Busbyside and Ryat. Busby as a village name could have disappeared, had it not been for events on the opposite side of the River Cart.

=== Cotton ===
The second big change started in 1780 with the founding of Busby's first cotton mill. This was at Newmill, on Cartsbridge lands on the opposite side of the River Cart. Busby and Newmill each had several earlier mills. Busby itself had Busby Meal Mill at the end of Field Road (founded before 1300), and Busby Waulk Mill in the Glen. Newmill also had two mills, situated together at the waterfall. The first was another early Meal Mill and the second a more recent Lint Mill. However, the cotton mill built in 1780 was on a completely different scale to the old rural mills. It attracted many families to settle in the area, and the centre of Busby swung from the old declining fermtoun on the Lanarkshire side of the River Cart, to Newmill on the Renfrewshire side.

A second Cotton Mill followed in 1790, then a Bleachfield and Printworks six years later. These industries provided the employment for the development of the modern village of Busby.

=== Paisley to East Kilbride road ===
The third major change in Busby in the 1780s was a new road from Paisley to East Kilbride, which went through the village. The first Busby Bridge was built on this route c.1785, and replaced an earlier ford above the waterfall. The new road changed the focus from the old Carmunnock—Mearns road to the Paisley—East Kilbride road.

Busby was never the perfect site for building a village, but developed due to the availability of water power on the River Cart. From the 1780s the village became centred on a hilly part of Cartsbridge Farm, originally known as "The Bank". Busby's Main Street was built on a very steep hill (although steep hills are very common in the area), and the road through to what is now Clarkston's town centre was built along a fragile slope which has collapsed several times since.

=== Railway age ===
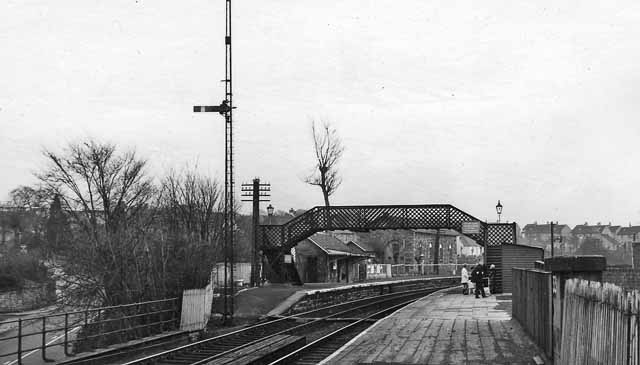
Busby railway station in 1970

Another major wave of change occurred in Busby in the 1860s, when the Printworks (now the Field Road industrial estate) brought the railway to Busby. Again the route to Busby was far from perfect, and the massive viaduct necessary to span Busby Glen was the most expensive structure on the line. Today the viaduct is an iconic feature of the area. The railway forced a change to the East Kilbride Road and the road bridge under the station still creates a hazard for heavy traffic on the main road. The bridge is particularly low, and has been hit by high buses in the past.

The railway brought a second wave of growth to Busby from the 1870s. The subsequent growth of the commuter suburb compensated for the decline of the Mills and Printworks. This ensured the survival of Busby into the twentieth and twenty-first centuries.

== Points of interest ==
=== Parks ===
Busby contains multiple parks, the main ones being the large Busby Glen Park, at the east end of the aforementioned viaduct, Southview Park, and Spider Park.

=== Historic buildings ===
Most of the old buildings in west Busby (including almost all traces of the old mills) have been demolished or lost in some other way. However, one old building is left on Riverside Terrace. Busby's school and church are both very old, and much of the east part of Busby (historically the Lanarkshire side) is now a conservation area.

Busby Hotel is also a major local landmark. The building was refurbished extensively in 2014. Old pubs in the area include The White Cart, which was built out of two different houses in east Busby, and the Cartvale pub on Busby's main street.

== Notable people ==
Thomas Donohoe, a pioneer of football in Brazil, was born and raised in Busby. There is a sculpture in his honour at the car park in Mary Young Place.

== Clubs and organisations ==
Busby Lawn Tennis Club
