= East Kilbride railway station =

Railway station in South Lanarkshire, Scotland

East Kilbride Scottish Gaelic: Cille Bhrìghde an Ear
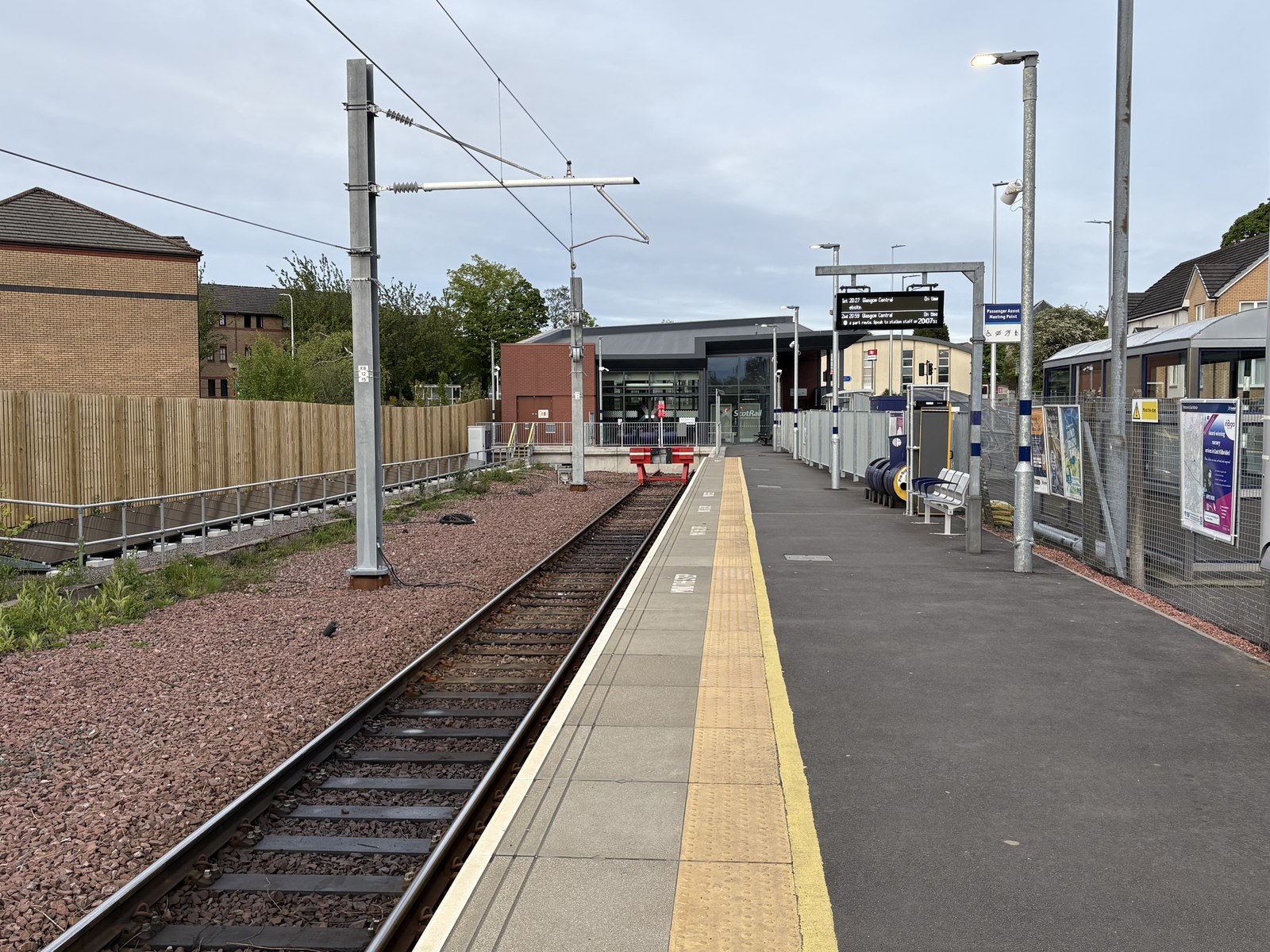
- The station in 2026

General information
- Location: East Kilbride, South Lanarkshire; Scotland
- Coordinates: 55.7659°N 4.1810°W
- Grid reference: NS633546
- Manager: ScotRail
- Platforms: 1

Other information
- Station code: EKL

History
- Original company: Busby Railway

Key dates
- 1 September 1868: Opened

Passengers
- 2020/21: ▼0.134 million (Note: Impacted by the COVID-19 lockdown in the United Kingdom)
- 2021/22: ▲0.446 million
- 2022/23: ▲0.574 million
- 2023/24: ▲0.757 million
- 2024/25: ▼0.583 million (Note: Impacted due to January-May closure for electrification)
Location
Notes
- Passenger statistics from the Office of Rail and Road

East Kilbride railway station serves the town of East Kilbride, South Lanarkshire, Scotland. The station is managed by ScotRail and it is a terminus on the former Busby Railway. The station is 11 1/2 miles (18.5 km) southeast of Glasgow Central.

== Early history ==
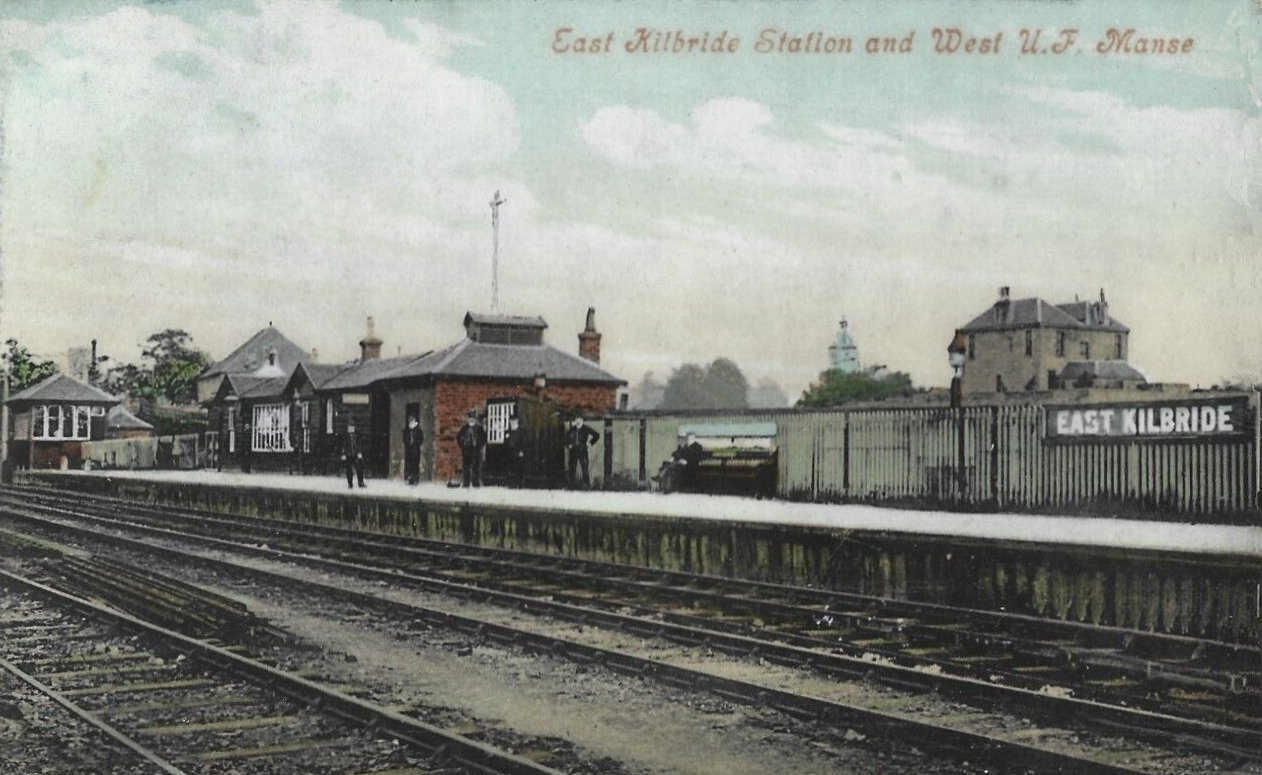
East Kilbride railway station about 1909

Initially opened in 1868, and operated by the Caledonian Railway Company from Glasgow via Busby which was a spur from the Glasgow to Barrhead railway at Pollokshaws, the line was extended eastwards in 1888 to Hunthill Junction, near High Blantyre, with an intermediate halt at Calderwood Glen.

At Hunthill was a triangular junction where the line from Strathaven joined, then the line proceeded towards Auchinraith Junction where it joined the current Hamiton – Blantyre section of line. This extension of the line was never busy and traffic was suspended during the 1914–18 war, with complete closure coming about as a consequence of the 1939–45 war, after which the line was cut back to Nerston where it serviced some local industries such as Mavor and Coulson Mining Equipment.

The section immediately beyond East Kilbride station was also used for many years for shunting etc., and photographs exist of a derailment of a locomotive in this section in 1951. The section between Busby and East Kilbride has always been a single line and was worked by a token arrangement until the resignalling of the East Kilbride Line on 24 February 1974.

== 1966 ==
The section from Nerston to the current station was closed on 24 January 1966, shortly before the last steam-hauled passenger services ceased in March of that year. Some of the track beyond East Kilbride was in situ until the early 1970s although not in use; photographs as late as 1972 show an overbridge at West Mains Road and the line continuing underneath.

The course of the former railway is built on immediately beyond the station; however, the route can be easily followed towards Nerston and beyond. The line is in fact a footpath between Main Street and East Mains Road and to this day is still easily recognisable as a former railway. The former viaduct at High Blantyre is long gone but the piers are still easily visible. Beyond High Blantyre the route is completely replaced by housing but is still possible to follow with a careful eye on Google Maps.

Despite the postwar development of East Kilbride as a New town development, serious consideration was given to the closure of the line following the 'Beeching Report'. However, a concerted effort by the Glasgow-East Kilbride Railway Development Association in the late 1960s secured the line's survival into the present era.

== Present era ==
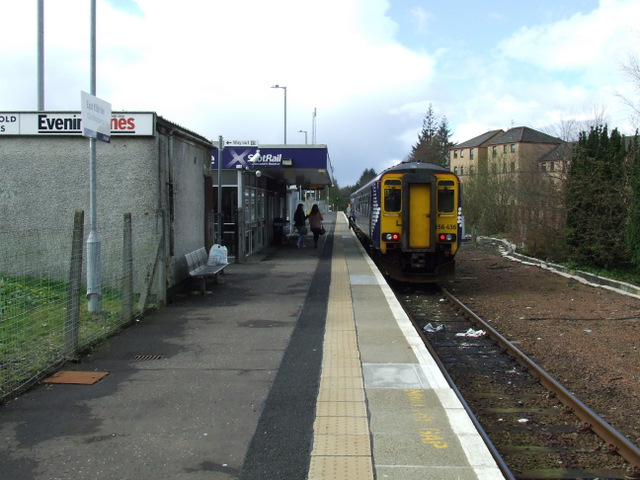
The station in 2012, prior to electrification

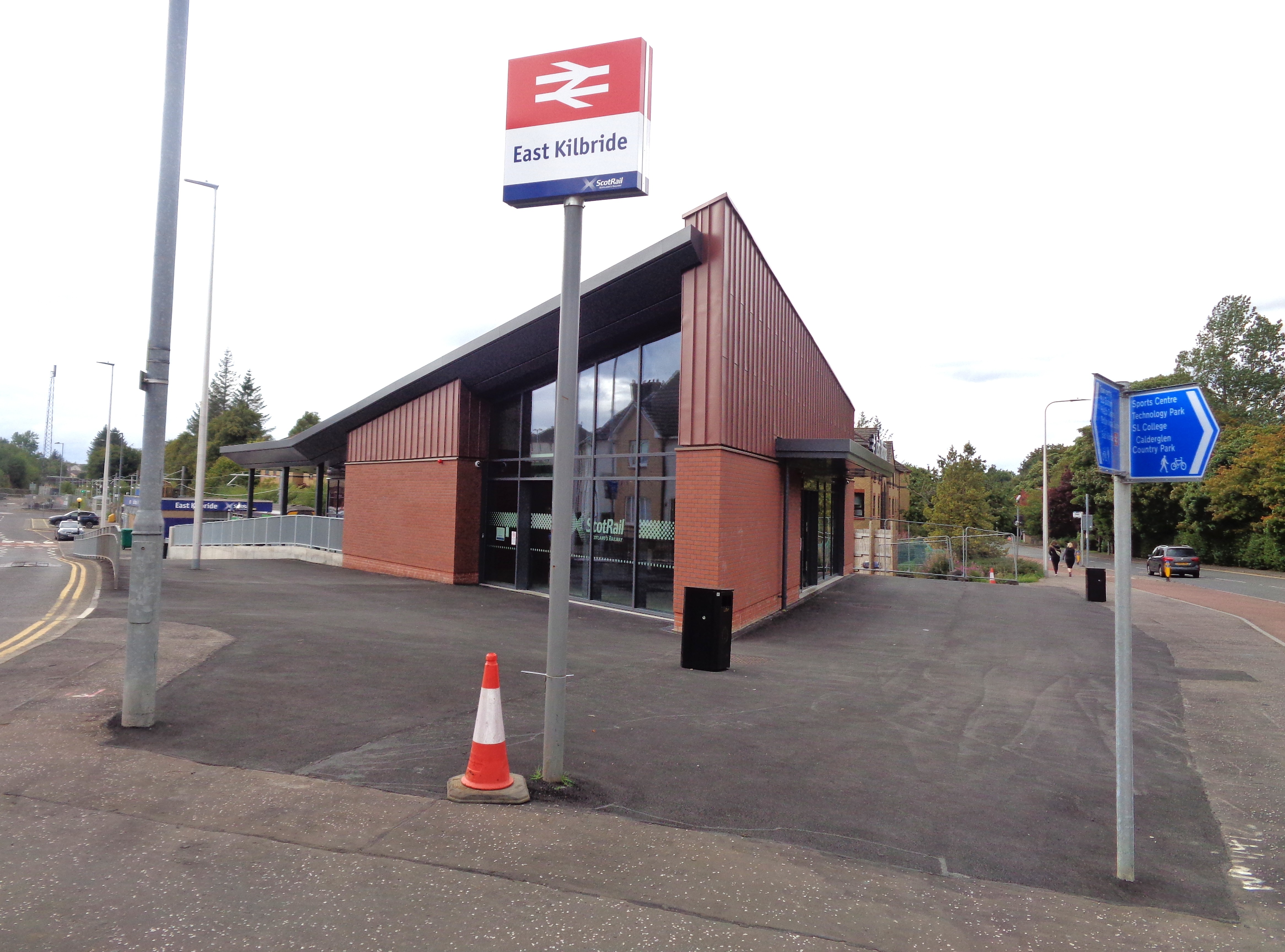
The new station building in 2025

Goods traffic to East Kilbride, latterly domestic coal for Kanes, lasted until the 1980s. The goods yard next to the station was demolished in the late 1980s, after which the land was sold and redeveloped as private flats. The Caledonian goods shed survived the loss of general freight in the late 1960s and was occupied by scrap merchants until about 1990, then being demolished during redevelopment of the site.

The station is considered to be poorly positioned for modern uses, as it is built near the heart of the old village of East Kilbride, and only partly serves the large new area that has grown since it opened. Since the 1970s, there have been a number of plans to extend the line to East Kilbride Shopping Centre and the bus station; however, none of these have ever come to fruition, primarily due to the cost of any such project and the difficulty in the steep and densely built over terrain between the current station and the centre. The last such proposal in 1989, which involved tunnelling beneath the area around the Civic Centre to reach the new (1986) bus station, was defeated by protests from local 'NIMBY' interests.

British Rail & SPTE also published plans in the early 1980s to re-route services west of Clarkston onto the Neilston branch of the Cathcart Circle Lines using a short-lived connection between the two routes first laid in 1903. This would have brought overhead electrification to the branch and seen trains run via Muirend and Cathcart to Glasgow, but also seen Giffnock & Thornliebank stations closed (along with the section of line between Clarkston & Busby Junction). The proposals proved unpopular and were not implemented.

In spite of the aforementioned setback, several service improvements have been made since 1990, including the introduction of a half-hourly train services following the installation of a passing loop between East Kilbride and Hairmyres, platform lengthening and expansion of 'park and ride' facilities. Previously, additional peak hour services were provided by additional trains which shunted from the siding at East Kilbride, although this fell into disuse after the half hourly service was introduced and was dismantled and lifted in 2005.

The once quite extensive infrastructure that existed at East Kilbride is no more and only a single line to the buffer stop now exists. Additionally, there is room available for future expansion to two platforms should the need arise.

The station hosts a ticket kiosk that is open most of the hours that trains run to and from the station, as well as a small News Kiosk shop.

The station and the entire East Kilbride line was closed from 25 January to 18 May 2025 as part of an upgrade project, which includes electrification of the line. Electrification was completed in December 2025.

On 20 August 2025, the new £9 million station building at East Kilbride was opened, which provides a new ticket office, barriers and waiting area, as well as improved accessibility.

== Services ==
There is a daily half-hourly service (including Sundays) north-west to Glasgow Central with extra journeys during weekday peak periods. There are 38 trains a day into Glasgow in the weekday timetable. The average journey time to Glasgow Central is 30 minutes. The earliest train leaving the station is at 06:18 Monday to Friday, and 08:26 on Sundays. The last train to arrive at the station is at 23:50.

Preceding station	National Rail	Following station
Terminus	ScotRail; Glasgow South Western Line	Hairmyres
	Disused railways	
Calderwood Glen Platform	Caledonian Railway; Blantyre and East Kilbride Branch	Hairmyres

== Bibliography ==
- Brailsford, Martyn, ed. (December 2017) [1987]. Railway Track Diagrams 1: Scotland & Isle of Man (6th ed.). Frome: Trackmaps. ISBN 978-0-9549866-9-8.
- Butt, R. V. J. (October 1995). The Directory of Railway Stations: details every public and private passenger station, halt, platform and stopping place, past and present (1st ed.). Sparkford: Patrick Stephens Ltd. ISBN 978-1-85260-508-7. OCLC 60251199. OL 11956311M.
