= Burnside railway station =

Railway station in South Lanarkshire, Scotland

Burnside Scottish Gaelic: Taobh an Uillt
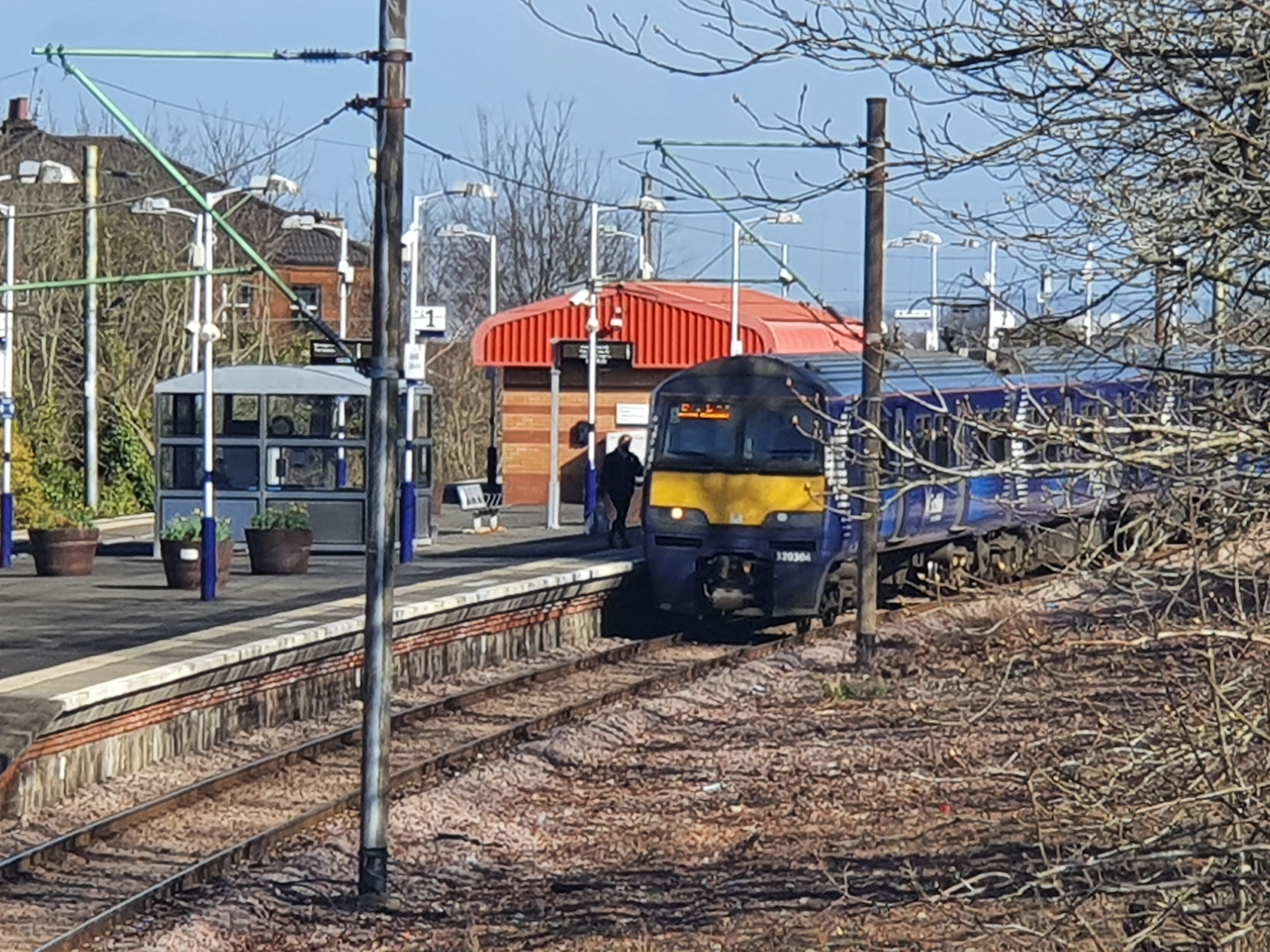
- A Class 320 EMU at Platform 1, heading to Glasgow Central

General information
- Location: Burnside, South Lanarkshire; Scotland
- Coordinates: 55.8169°N 4.2030°W
- Grid reference: NS620603
- Manager: ScotRail
- Platforms: 2

Other information
- Station code: BUI

History
- Original company: Lanarkshire and Ayrshire Railway
- Pre-grouping: Caledonian Railway
- Post-grouping: LMS

Key dates
- 1 August 1904: Opened

Passengers
- 2021/22: ▲0.132 million
- 2022/23: ▲0.182 million
- 2023/24: ▲0.216 million
- 2024/25: ▲0.225 million
- 2025/26: ▼0.222 million
Location
Notes
- Passenger statistics from the Office of Rail and Road

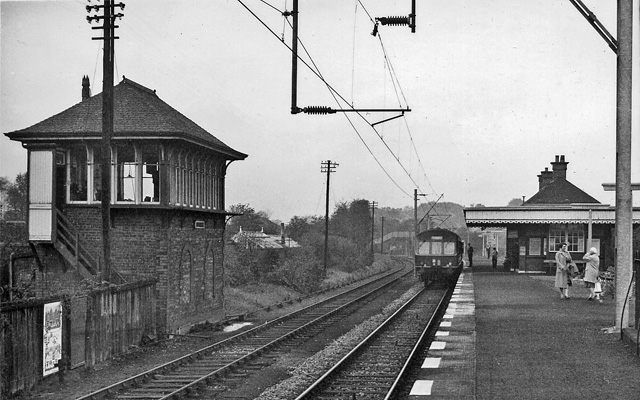
View westward, towards Glasgow in 1961

Burnside railway station serves the Burnside and Blairbeth areas of the royal burgh of Rutherglen, South Lanarkshire, Scotland. The station is managed by ScotRail and is located on the Newton branch of the Cathcart Circle Lines, which has been electrified since 1962 by British Railways. This is the busiest railway station on the Newton branch.

== History ==
The station was opened by the Lanarkshire and Ayrshire Railway on 1 August 1904. Later taken over by the Caledonian Railway, it became part of the London, Midland and Scottish Railway at the 1923 Grouping and subsequently the Scottish Region of British Railways at nationalisation in 1948. B.R electrified the line through the station in 1962, when the section beyond Neilston was closed - since that time, all services have run to/from Glasgow only, though it became possible to travel there via both sides of the Circle following track alterations in the Carthcart area carried out as part of the modernisation work.

== Facilities ==
Access to this station is by one of two railway bridges and as a result there is no disabled access to trains from here. A single waiting room serves both platforms. The ticket office is only open on Mondays to Saturdays. Customer information screens are also available at this station. A help point is available, like on every other ScotRail station in Glasgow. Automatic announcements have recently been fitted at this station as well as all the stations on the Cathcart Circle. There is no dedicated car park, but six cycle storage places are available.

In early 2025, the aging iron footbridge at the west of the station platforms (also a useful access route for the adjacent primary school) was closed due to concerns over its deteriorating condition. After a period of disagreement between South Lanarkshire Council and Network Rail over who had ownership and should bear the cost of a replacement (after negotiations involving local representatives, it was decided this would be shared), work was scheduled for February 2026.

== Services ==
=== From 1974 ===
Following the electrification of the West Coast Main Line by British Rail, the basic service was:

- Monday to Saturday
  - two trains per hour between Glasgow Central and Kirkhill via Maxwell Park
  - two trains per hour between Glasgow Central and Newton via Queen's Park
- Sundays
  - two trains per hour between Glasgow Central and Newton via Queen's Park
- Additional peak hour services were provided to Motherwell via both sides of the Hamilton Circle.

=== From 1979 ===
Following the opening of the Argyle Line in November 1979 by British Rail, services on the Cathcart Circle were reorganised. The basic service was:

- Monday to Saturday
  - two trains per hour between Glasgow Central and Newton via Maxwell Park
  - two trains per hour between Glasgow Central and Newton via Queen's Park
- Sundays
  - two trains per hour between Glasgow Central and Newton via Queen's Park

=== From 2005 ===
- Monday to Sunday
  - one train per hour between Glasgow Central and Newton via Maxwell Park
  - one train per hour between Glasgow Central and Newton via Queen's Park

Preceding station	National Rail	Following station
Croftfoot	ScotRail; Cathcart Circle	Kirkhill
	Historical railways	
Muirend	Caledonian Railway; Lanarkshire and Ayrshire Railway	Kirkhill
