= Shawlands railway station =

Railway station in Glasgow, Scotland

Shawlands
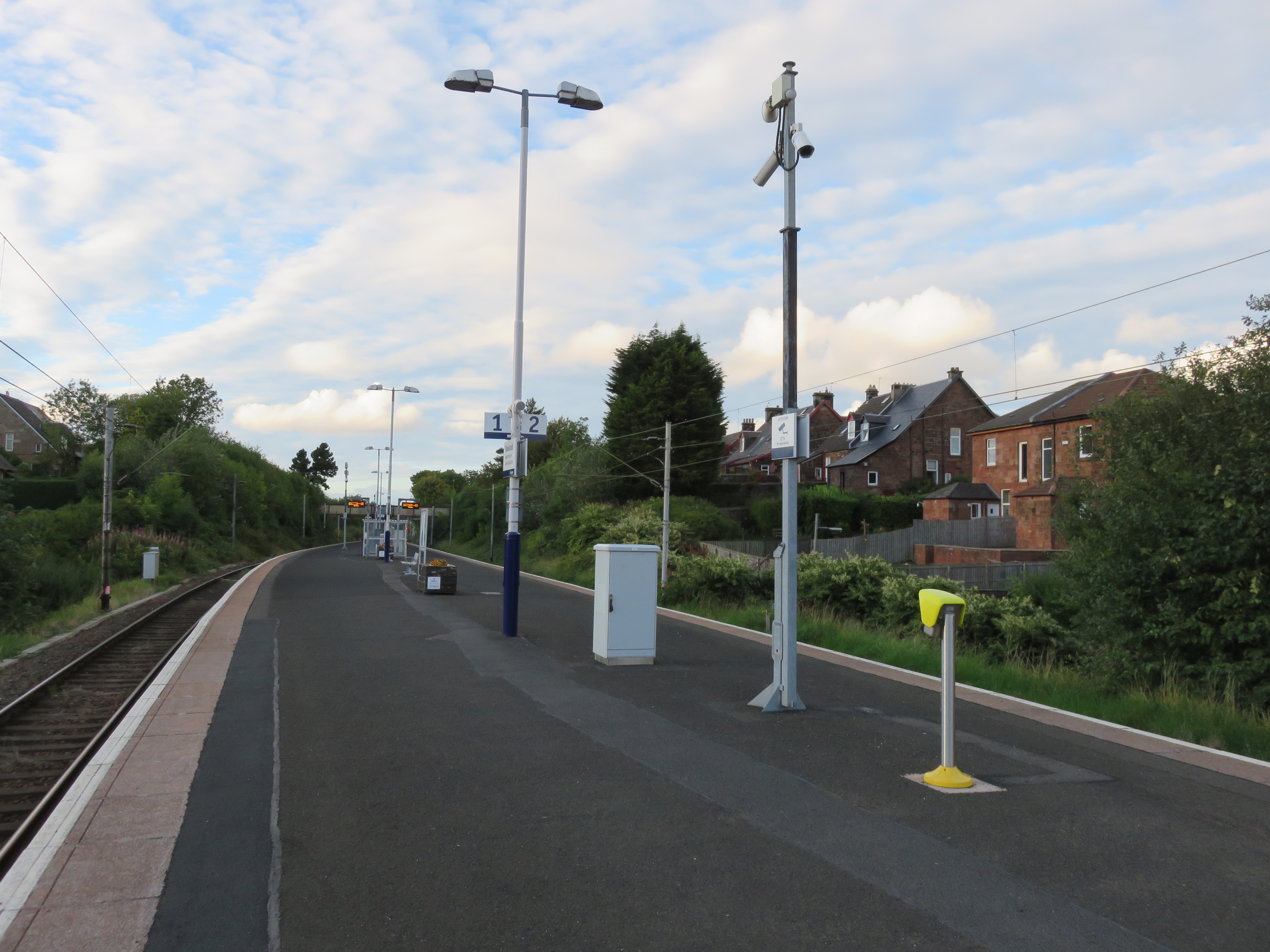
- The station seen in 2015

General information
- Location: Shawlands, Glasgow; Scotland
- Coordinates: 55.8293°N 4.2924°W
- Grid reference: NS565619
- Manager: ScotRail
- Transit authority: SPT
- Platforms: 2

Other information
- Station code: SHL
- Fare zone: 1

History
- Original company: Cathcart District Railway
- Pre-grouping: Caledonian Railway
- Post-grouping: LMS

Key dates
- 2 April 1894: Opened

Passengers
- 2021/22: ▲57,166
- 2022/23: ▲72,112
- 2023/24: ▲0.104 million
- 2024/25: ▲0.133 million
- 2025/26: ▲0.146 million
Location
Notes
- Passenger statistics from the Office of Rail and Road

Shawlands railway station is a railway station serving Shawlands, a suburb of Glasgow, Scotland. The station is managed by ScotRail and is located on the Cathcart Circle Line. It opened in April 1894, when the original line to Cathcart via Queens Park was extended in a loop back towards Glasgow Central. The Cathcart Circle Line has been electrified since 1962 under British Railways.

== Services ==
=== Up to November 1979 ===
Two trains per hour between Glasgow Central and Kirkhill and one train per hour in each direction on the Cathcart Circle (Inner and Outer).

=== From November 1979 ===
Following the opening of the Argyle Line on 5 November 1979, two trains per hour between Glasgow Central and Kirkhill and two trains per hour in each direction on the Cathcart Circle (Inner and Outer).

=== From 2006 ===
One train per hour between Glasgow Central and Kirkhill/Newton and one train per hour in each direction on the Cathcart Circle (Inner and Outer). On Sundays the Cathcart Circle trains do not operate, so only an hourly service is provided in each direction.

=== Routes ===
Preceding station	National Rail	Following station
Pollokshaws East	ScotRail; Cathcart Circle	Maxwell Park
	Historical railways	
Pollokshaws East; Line and station open	Caledonian Railway; Cathcart District Railway	Maxwell Park; Line and station open
