= Pollokshaws East railway station =

Railway station in Glasgow, Scotland

Pollokshaws East Scottish Gaelic: Pollokshaws an Ear
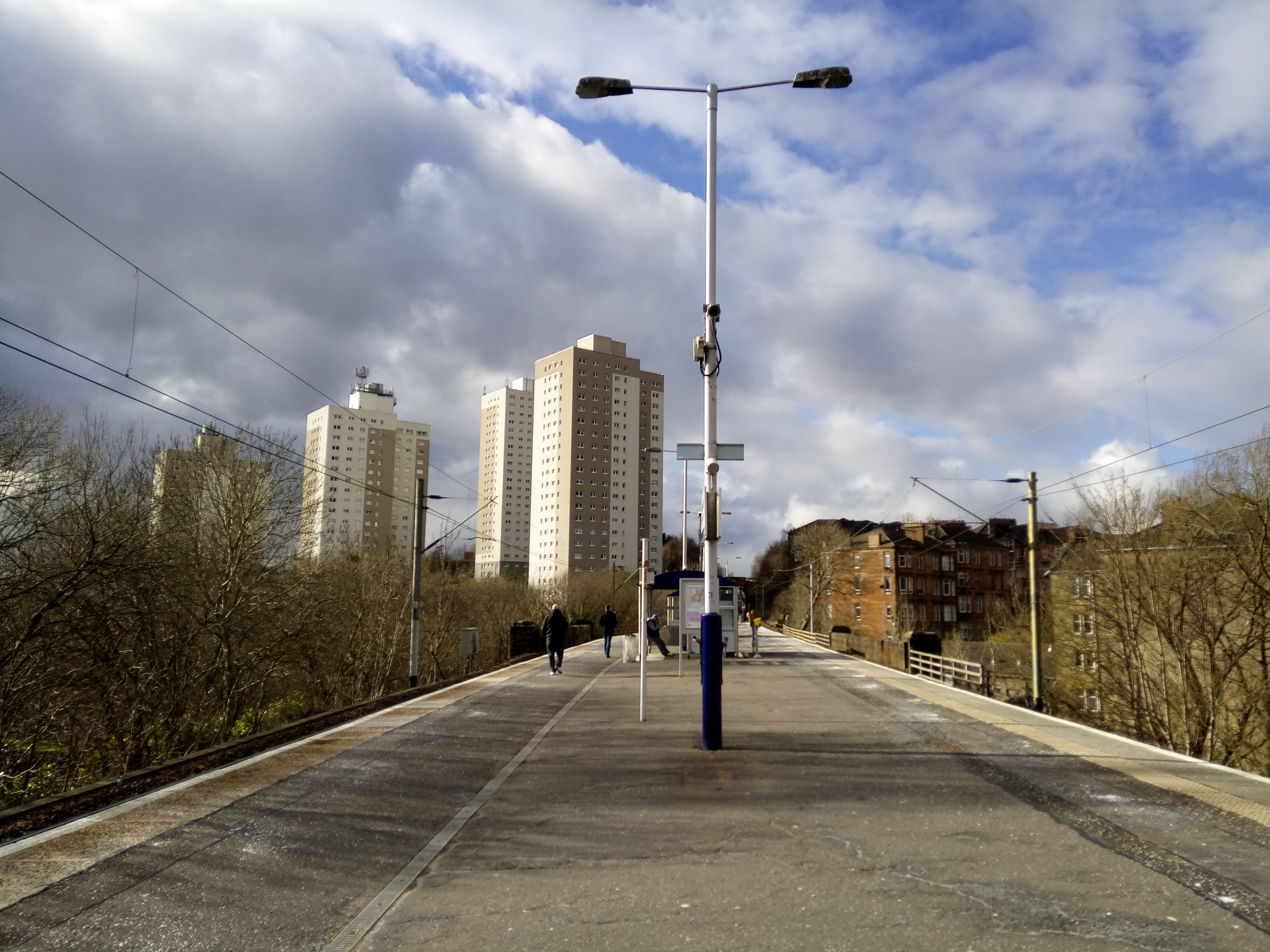
- Pollokshaws East railway station in 2018

General information
- Location: Pollokshaws, Glasgow; Scotland
- Coordinates: 55.8248°N 4.2872°W
- Grid reference: NS568614
- Manager: ScotRail
- Transit authority: SPT
- Platforms: 2

Other information
- Station code: PWE
- Fare zone: 1

History
- Original company: Cathcart District Railway
- Pre-grouping: Caledonian Railway
- Post-grouping: LMS

Key dates
- 2 April 1894: Opened

Passengers
- 2021/22: ▲0.150 million
- 2022/23: ▲0.188 million
- 2023/24: ▲0.269 million
- 2024/25: ▲0.362 million
- 2025/26: ▲0.394 million
Location
Notes
- Passenger statistics from the Office of Rail and Road

Pollokshaws East railway station is a railway station in Glasgow, Scotland, serving parts of the Pollokshaws, Auldhouse, Newlands and Shawlands neighbourhoods of the city. The station is managed by ScotRail and is located on the Cathcart Circle Line. Services are provided by ScotRail and have previously been provided by ScotRail on behalf of Strathclyde Passenger Transport.

== History ==
The Caledonian Railway extended the original Cathcart District Railway route back in a loop configuration towards Glasgow Central in 1894, opening the station here along with it on 2 April that year. The station had a goods yard on the north side of the line to the east of station (on the other side of Kilmarnock Road. This was served by a signal box on the south side of the line, opposite the yard. The signal box was closed on 16 October 1961 as part of the electrification scheme.

British Rail demolished the station building, replacing it with a shelter in the late 1980s. In 2006, housing was built on the site of the goods yard.

== Services ==
=== Up to November 1979 ===
Two trains per hour between Glasgow Central and Kirkhill and one train per hour in each direction on the Cathcart Circle (Inner and Outer).

=== From November 1979 ===
Following the opening of the Argyle Line on 5 November 1979, two trains per hour between Glasgow Central and Kirkhill and two trains per hour in each direction on the Cathcart Circle (Inner and Outer).

=== From 2006 ===
One train per hour between Glasgow Central and Newton via Kirkhill and one train per hour in each direction on the Cathcart Circle (Inner and Outer). On Sundays, there is an hourly service to/from Newton only.

=== Routes ===
Preceding station	National Rail	Following station
Langside	ScotRail; Cathcart Circle	Shawlands
	Historical railways	
Langside; Line and station open	Caledonian Railway; Cathcart District Railway	Shawlands; Line and station open
