= Eglinton Street railway station =

Former railway station in Scotland

Eglinton Street
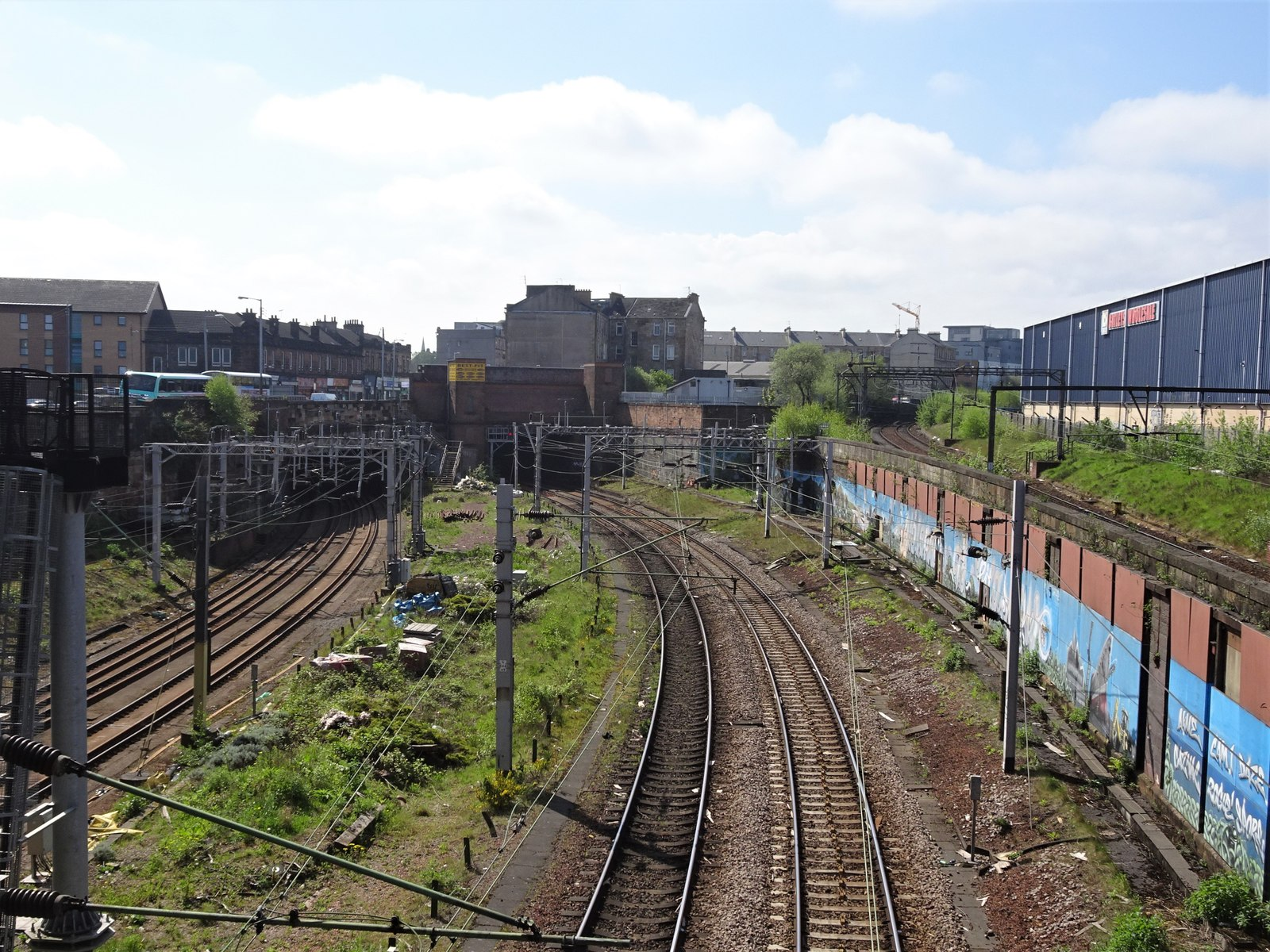
- The site of the station in 2019

General information
- Location: Port Eglinton, Glasgow; Scotland
- Coordinates: 55.8465°N 4.2609°W
- Platforms: 6

Other information
- Status: Disused

History
- Original company: Caledonian Railway
- Pre-grouping: Caledonian Railway
- Post-grouping: LMS

Key dates
- 1 July 1879: Opened (as per Glasgow Herald notice)
- 1 February 1965: Closed
Location

Eglinton Street railway station was a railway station approximately one mile (1.5 kilometres) south of Glasgow Central, in the Port Eglinton district of Glasgow.

== History ==
The Station opened on the 1st of July 1879 according to a contemporary Glasgow Herald notice. In the late 20th century Raymond Butt claimed that this station opened on Sunday 28 February 1909. However, contemporary sources, such as railway notices, timetables, maps, Post Office Directories and the Glasgow Herald notice, show that the station existed nearly 30 years before that date. Furthermore, the station opening on a Sunday would have been highly unlikely given Scotland's sabbatarian culture at the time.

When the station opened on 1 July 1879, it allowed Caledonian Railway trains from Edinburgh and Lanarkshire, which had previously terminated at Southside to reach Bridge Street, to connect with trains for Greenock and Wemyss Bay, with through carriages being provided from Edinburgh to stations on the Glasgow, Paisley and Greenock Railway and Greenock and Wemyss Bay Railway. These continued to terminate at Bridge Street even after Central Station had opened on 1 August 1879.

On 19 March 1883, there was a collision between two trains at Eglinton Street station in which four people died and many more were injured. The crash involved the 6:15pm train from Central Station to East Kilbride and the 5pm train from Edinburgh to Glasgow Central, which had stopped at Eglinton Street Station. The driver of the Edinburgh train failed to heed the signal against the train leaving the station. The East Kilbride train had left Central on time and had a clear signal to proceed. It was slowing down when it collided with the Edinburgh train which was getting up steam. The drivers and firemen of both trains survived the crash, having been violently thrown from their engines.

Opened by the Caledonian Railway on the former routes of the Cathcart District Railway and Polloc and Govan Railway on the southern approached to Glasgow Central, Eglinton Street station became part of the London Midland and Scottish Railway during the Grouping of 1923. The station was located in the routes to the:

- Two platforms - Cathcart Circle, the Barrhead, East Kilbride and Kilmarnock lines
- Four platforms - West Coast Main Line

The station was closed in 1965.

== The site today ==
Some parts of Eglinton Street station remain intact today, including sections of the platforms and access towers from the station platforms.

== Route ==
Preceding station	Historical railways	Following station
Glasgow Central; Line and station open	Caledonian Railway; Polloc and Govan Railway	Rutherglen; Line and station open
Glasgow Central; Line and station open	Caledonian Railway; Cathcart District Railway	Pollokshields East; Line and station open
Glasgow Central; Line and station open	Caledonian Railway; Cathcart District Railway	Pollokshields West; Line and station open
Glasgow Central; Line and station open	CR & G&SWR; Glasgow, Barrhead and Kilmarnock Joint Railway	Strathbungo; Line open; station closed
