= Pollokshields West railway station =

Railway station in Glasgow, Scotland

Pollokshields West Scottish Gaelic: Pollokshields an Iar
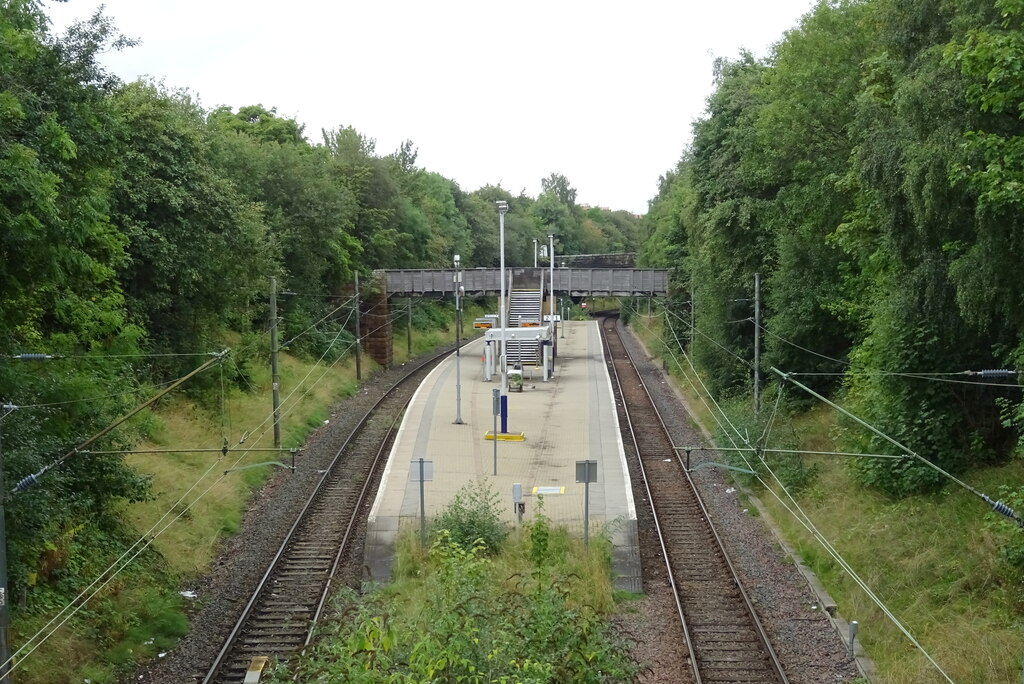
- View west towards Maxwell Park

General information
- Location: Pollokshields, Glasgow; Scotland
- Coordinates: 55.8376°N 4.2761°W
- Grid reference: NS575628
- Manager: ScotRail
- Transit authority: SPT
- Platforms: 2

Other information
- Station code: PLW
- Fare zone: 1

History
- Original company: Cathcart District Railway
- Pre-grouping: Caledonian Railway
- Post-grouping: LMS

Key dates
- 2 April 1894: Opened

Passengers
- 2021/22: ▲80,856
- 2022/23: ▲96,894
- 2023/24: ▲0.129 million
- 2024/25: ▲0.147 million
- 2025/26: ▲0.152 million
Location
Notes
- Passenger statistics from the Office of Rail and Road

Pollokshields West railway station is one of three railway stations in Pollokshields, a district of Glasgow, Scotland. The station is managed by ScotRail and lies on the Cathcart Circle Line. The Cathcart Circle Line has been electrified since 1962 under British Railways.

== Services ==
=== Up to November 1979 ===
Two trains per hour between Glasgow Central and Kirkhill and one train per hour in each direction on the Cathcart Circle (Inner and Outer).

=== From November 1979 ===
Following the opening of the Argyle Line on 5 November 1979, two trains per hour between Glasgow Central and Kirkhill and two trains per hour in each direction on the Cathcart Circle (Inner and Outer).

=== From 2006 ===
One train per hour between Glasgow Central and Kirkhill/Newton and one train per hour in each direction on the Cathcart Circle (Inner and Outer). The Cathcart Circle trains do not run on Sundays, so only an hourly service operates.

=== Routes ===
Preceding station	National Rail	Following station
Maxwell Park	ScotRail; Cathcart Circle	Glasgow Central
	Historical railways	
Maxwell Park; Line and station open	Caledonian Railway; Cathcart District Railway	Eglinton Street; Line open; station closed

== See also ==
- Pollokshields railway station
- Pollokshields East railway station
