= Maxwell Park railway station =

Railway station in Glasgow, Scotland

Maxwell Park Scottish Gaelic: Pàirc Maxwell
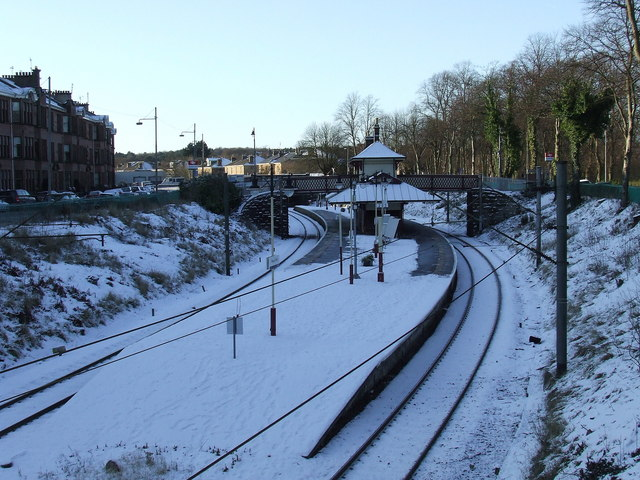
- Maxwell Park railway station

General information
- Location: Pollokshields, Glasgow; Scotland
- Coordinates: 55.8376°N 4.2888°W
- Grid reference: NS567628
- Manager: ScotRail
- Transit authority: SPT
- Platforms: 2

Other information
- Station code: MAX
- Fare zone: 1

History
- Original company: Cathcart District Railway
- Pre-grouping: Caledonian Railway
- Post-grouping: LMS

Key dates
- 2 April 1894: Opened

Passengers
- 2021/22: ▲53,612
- 2022/23: ▲68,034
- 2023/24: ▲93,826
- 2024/25: ▲0.116 million
- 2025/26: ▲0.126 million
Location
Notes
- Passenger statistics from the Office of Rail and Road

Maxwell Park railway station is a railway station in Pollokshields, Glasgow, Scotland, adjacent to the park of the same name. The station is managed by ScotRail and is located on the Cathcart Circle Line, which has been electrified since 1962 by British Railways.

== History ==
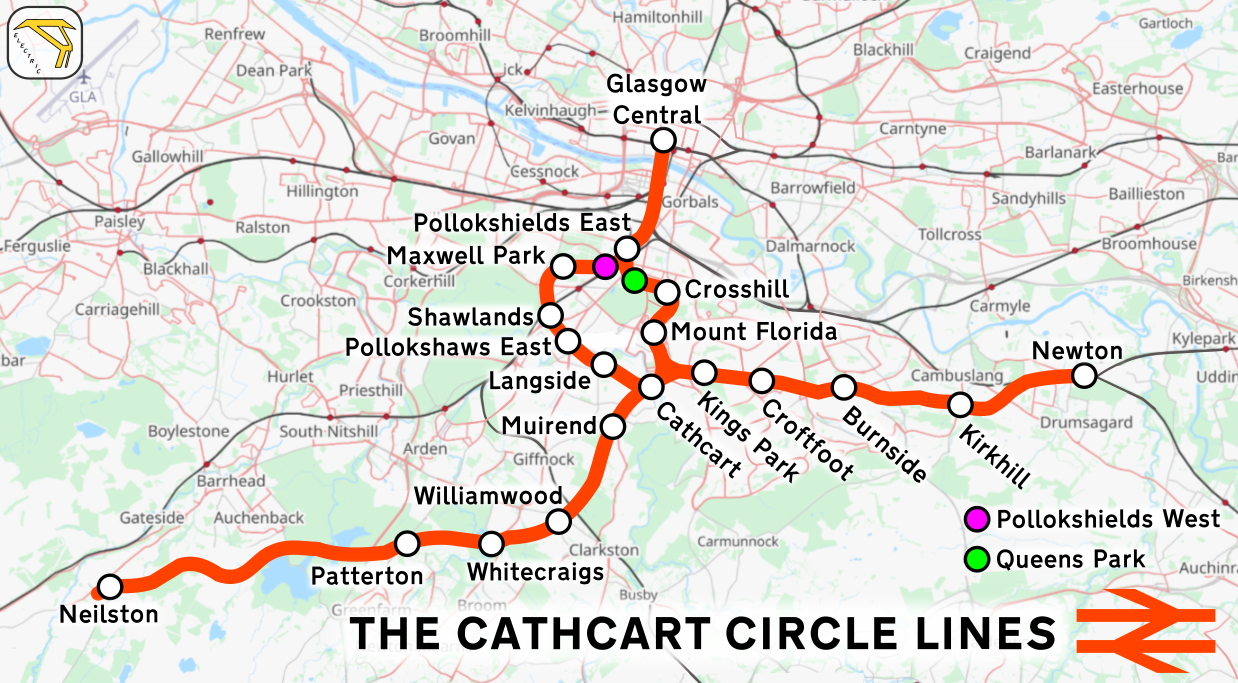
Cathcart Circle Lines route map

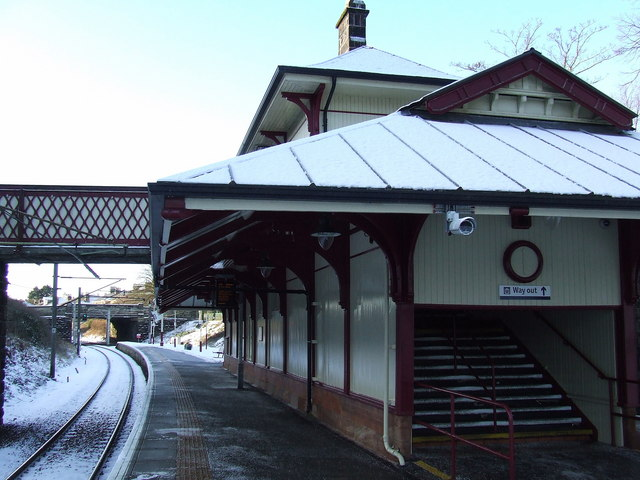
Station Building

Maxwell Park station was built in 1894 by the Caledonian Railway, as an extension of the earlier Cathcart District Railway back towards Glasgow Central. The station is protected as a category B listed building. The bottom half of the station building has also now been repainted to match the ScotRail blue colour scheme of its operator.

== Services ==
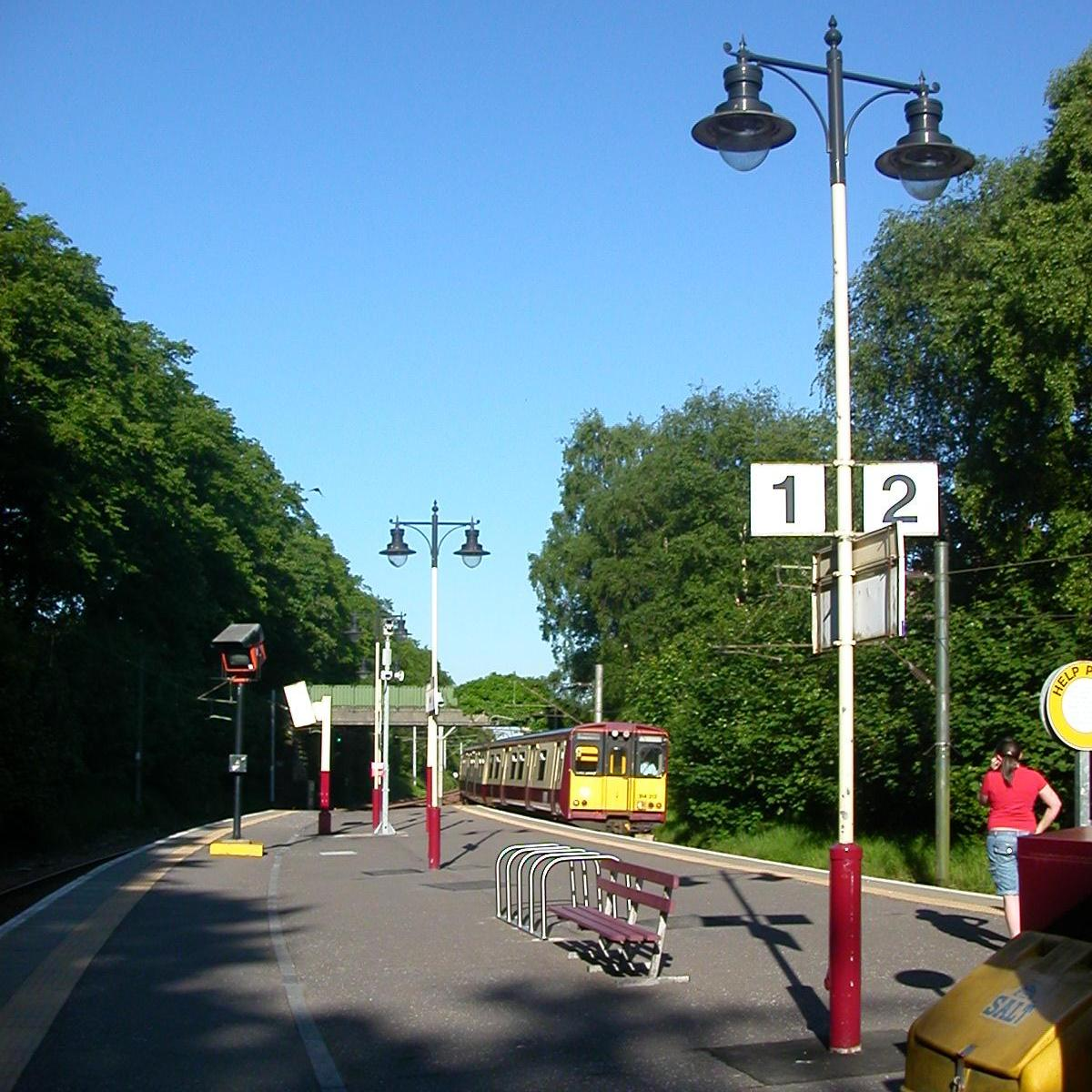
Train arriving into platform 2

=== Up to November 1979 ===
Two trains per hour between Glasgow Central and Kirkhill and one train per hour in each direction on the Cathcart Circle (Inner and Outer).

=== From November 1979 ===
Following the opening of the Argyle Line on 5 November 1979, two trains per hour between Glasgow Central and Kirkhill and two trains per hour in each direction on the Cathcart Circle (Inner and Outer).

=== From 2006 ===
One train per hour between Glasgow Central and Newton and one train per hour in each direction on the Cathcart Circle (Inner and Outer). On Sundays the Circle services do not run, so only 1tph calls each way to/from Newton.

=== Routes ===
Preceding station	National Rail	Following station
Shawlands	ScotRail; Cathcart Circle	Pollokshields West
	Historical railways	
Shawlands; Line and station open	Caledonian Railway; Cathcart District Railway	Pollokshields West; Line and station open
