= Kirkhill railway station =

Railway station in South Lanarkshire, Scotland

Kirkhill Scottish Gaelic: Cnoc na Cille
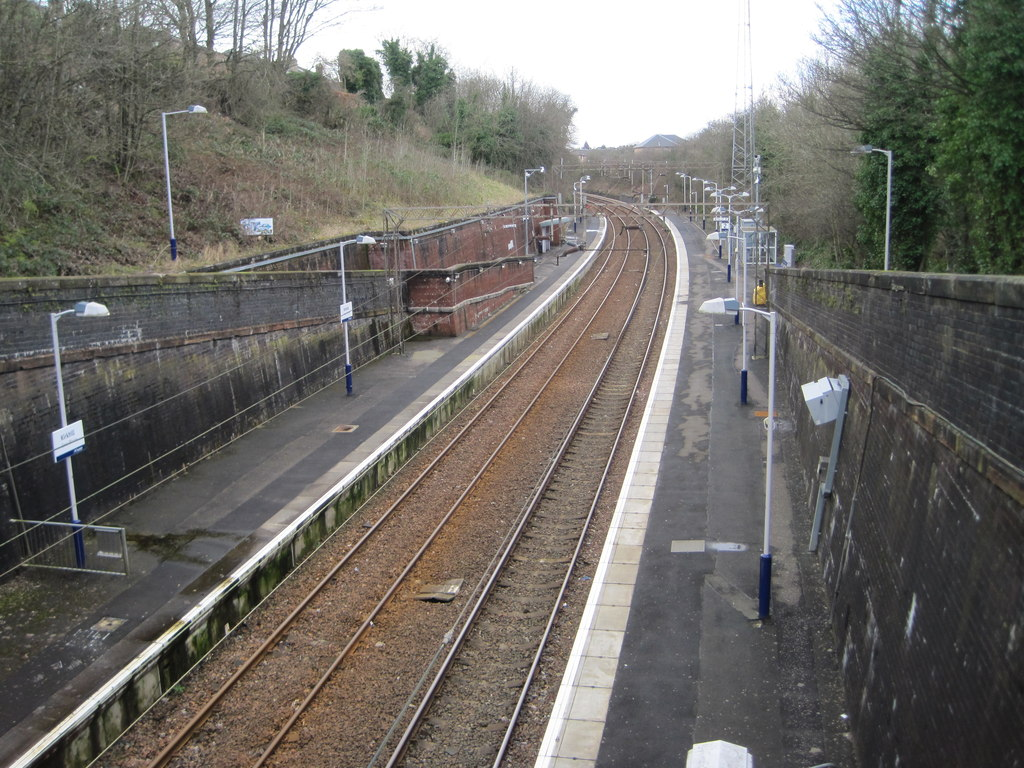

General information
- Location: Cambuslang, South Lanarkshire; Scotland
- Coordinates: 55.8141°N 4.1678°W
- Grid reference: NS642600
- Manager: ScotRail
- Transit authority: SPT
- Platforms: 2

Other information
- Station code: KKH

History
- Original company: Lanarkshire and Ayrshire Railway
- Pre-grouping: Caledonian Railway
- Post-grouping: London, Midland and Scottish Railway

Key dates
- 1 August 1904: Opened

Passengers
- 2021/22: ▲38,876
- 2022/23: ▲58,128
- 2023/24: ▲65,226
- 2024/25: ▼64,162
- 2025/26: ▲66,286
Location
Notes
- Passenger statistics from the Office of Rail and Road

Kirkhill railway station is a railway station serving the Kirkhill area of the town of Cambuslang, South Lanarkshire, Greater Glasgow, Scotland. The station is managed by ScotRail and is located on the Cathcart Circle Lines. This is the least used station on the Newton Branch.

== History ==
The station was originally opened as part of the Lanarkshire and Ayrshire Railway on 1 August 1904. Kirkhill station was the final station to be opened on the line before it was absorbed into the London, Midland and Scottish Railway in 1923. From 1948 until 1997, services were operated by the nationalised British Railways who electrified the route in 1962.

The station was provided with a Swiss Chalet style building on the tunnel above the east of the station which was demolished.

== Services ==
=== From 1974 ===
Following the electrification of the West Coast Main Line the basic service was:

- Monday to Saturday

- two terminating trains per hour from Glasgow Central via Maxwell Park
- two trains per hour between Glasgow Central and Newton via Queen's Park

- Sundays

- two trains per hour between Glasgow Central and Newton via Queen's Park

- Additional peak hour services were provided to Motherwell via both sides of the Hamilton Circle.

=== From 1979 ===
Following the opening of the Argyle Line in November 1979, services on the Cathcart Circle were reorganised. The basic service was:

- Monday to Saturday

- two trains per hour between Glasgow Central and Newton via Maxwell Park
- two trains per hour between Glasgow Central and Newton via Queen's Park

- Sundays

- two trains per hour between Glasgow Central and Newton via Queen's Park

The removal of terminating services at Kirkhill enabled the turnback siding east of the station to be closed and lifted shortly afterwards.

=== From 2005 ===
- Monday to Friday

- one train per hour between Glasgow Central and Newton via Maxwell Park
- one train per hour between Glasgow Central and Newton via Queen's Park
- Additional morning peak hour services.

- Saturday to Sunday
  - one train per hour between Glasgow Central and Newton via Maxwell Park
  - one train per hour between Glasgow Central and Newton via Queen's Park

Preceding station	National Rail	Following station
Burnside	ScotRail; Cathcart Circle Lines	Newton
	Historical railways	
Burnside; Line and station open	Caledonian Railway; Lanarkshire and Ayrshire Railway	Newton; Line and station open
Burnside; Line and station open	Caledonian Railway; Lanarkshire and Ayrshire Railway and Glasgow Central Railway	Carmyle; Line partially open; station open
