= Hielanman's Umbrella =

Landmark in Glasgow, Scotland

Highlandman's Umbrella Hielanman's Umbrella (Scots)
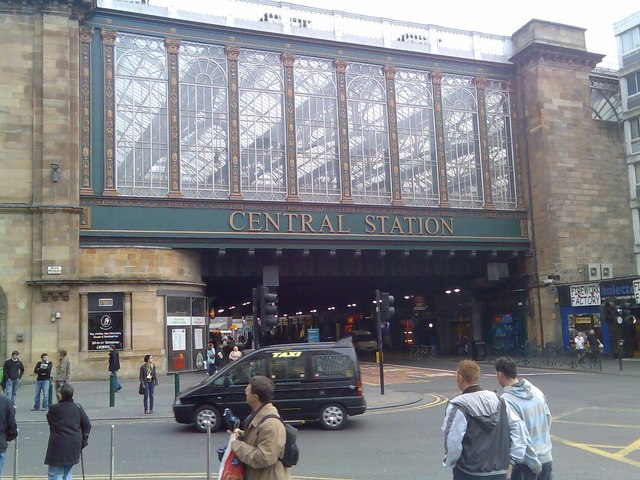
- The western face of Hielanman's Umbrella.
- Coordinates: 55.85847°N 4.25824°W
- Crosses: Argyll Street
- Locale: Glasgow

Location
- Interactive map of Highlandman's Umbrella

The Hielanman's Umbrella (English: Highlandman's Umbrella) is a landmark in the centre of Glasgow, Scotland. It is the local Glaswegian nickname for the glass walled railway bridge which carries the platforms of Glasgow Central station across Argyle Street. It is built in Victorian style.

== History ==
Due to the forced displacement of people during the second phase of the Highland Clearances in the 19th century, 30,000 Highlanders who spoke Scottish Gaelic, but not English, came to Glasgow to find work. When arriving in the city they were housed in many different areas of Glasgow. The Highlanders predominantly found work within domestic service in areas like Park Circus or in one of the many industries, where they would work, for example, for the river ferries.

St Columba's Church of Scotland, a prominent local landmark serving the Gaelic community (originally established in 1770), was located on Hope Street from 1839 until being demolished in the early 1900s for the expansion of Central Station, which included the widening of the bridge over Argyle Street (a few yards south of the church) to accommodate more lines. Although an impressive replacement building – known as the 'Highland Cathedral' – was constructed further west on St. Vincent Street, a close association with the environs of the old church persisted. There was also another Gaelic (Free Church) congregation based nearby, initially at Gordon Street (from 1824 to 1886) then Waterloo Street (from 1886 until 1957).

Over many years Highlanders continued to arrive and began to keep in touch by meeting under the bridge, mostly at weekends. With the city's inclement weather and the meeting of the Highlanders it came to be known as the Hielanman's Umbrella. At the meetings they would share news and gossip from the homelands and of events in the city. The first long-distance television pictures transmitted in the UK were sent to Glasgow Central Station in 1927. The Umbrella tradition reached its height in the 1920s and '30s, however, due to the Second World War and the resulting blackout, the tradition of meeting under the bridge died out.

=== Recent Development ===
Glasgow Central Station and the Hielanman's Umbrella has been renovated several times. In 1998, the bridge was substantially refurbished by Railtrack (which later became Network Rail in 2002) in line with the rest of the station - its distinctive Venetian style windows were reglazed, and the gold "Central Station" lettering was applied. Efforts were also made to improve the environment underneath the bridge to encourage retailers back into the shop units - high powered lighting and extractor fans were installed. The street level entrances to Central Station under the bridge were also upgraded.

In 2001, a new entrance to the burgeoning Arches nightclub and restaurant complex was added under the bridge which led to the level of pedestrian footfall increasing markedly. In 2015 The Hielanman's Umbrella, as part of the Glasgow Central Station, won the Scottish Design Award.

In November 2019, a ten-year-regeneration plan for the Glasgow city centre was announced, including a plan of turning the Hielanman's Umbrella into a light and attractive station lobby.

== Appearances in Literature ==
The Hielanman's Umbrella is mentioned in Jackie Kay's novel Trumpet from 1998:

We court for three months. A kiss on the cheek at the end of the date. Meeting at Boot's Corner, at The Shell in Central Station, or below The Hielan Man's Umbrella under where the trains come out of Central Station on Argyle Street, between Hope Street and Union Street. The times I've waited for Joss sheltered from the rain, under the Hielan Man's Umbrella imagining the Highland men years ago, fresh down from the Highlands talking excited Gaelic to each other. Either we go drinking or we go dancing.

— Jackie Kay, Trumpet

It also appears in Simon Jenkins' book Britain's 100 Best Railway Stations from 2017.

The bridge is like a whale, beached across the street, except for Miller’s ability to lighten a blank wall with stylish, classically detailed and arched windows. They offer a glimpse of the interior roof and make the bridge seem almost lightweight.

— Simon Jenkins, Britain’s 100 Best Railway Stations

== See also ==
- List of bridges in Scotland
