= St Andrew's Cross, Glasgow =

Coordinates: 55°50′35.1″N 4°15′45.5″W

St Andrew's Cross: Eglinton Toll
- Location within Glasgow
- OS grid reference: NS584634
- Council area: Glasgow City Council
- Lieutenancy area: Glasgow
- Country: Scotland
- Sovereign state: United Kingdom
- Post town: GLASGOW
- Postcode district: G5, G41, G42
- Dialling code: 0141
- Police: Scotland
- Fire: Scottish
- Ambulance: Scottish

St Andrew's Cross, also known as Eglinton Toll, is a road junction in the south side of the city of Glasgow, Scotland. First constructed during the early 1800s, the junction formerly held several buildings including a power station and cinema, but have been removed for a variety of reasons. Since 1946 when the junction underwent a realignment, the two roads no longer intersect.

== Description ==
The junction includes two roads running roughly north-south which meet, but do not intersect for vehicular traffic since a realignment in 1946: the west thoroughfare (A77) is known as Eglinton Street from Laurieston (the Gorbals) until it reaches the junction then becomes Pollokshaws Road to Strathbungo and beyond, while the east thoroughfare is Pollokshaws Road from Laurieston until the same point then is renamed Victoria Road entering Govanhill. Maxwell Road also meets the junction from the west (Pollokshields) but this is also blocked off for vehicles. Addresses on each side of the cross come under three different postcodes (G5, G41 and G42).

== History ==
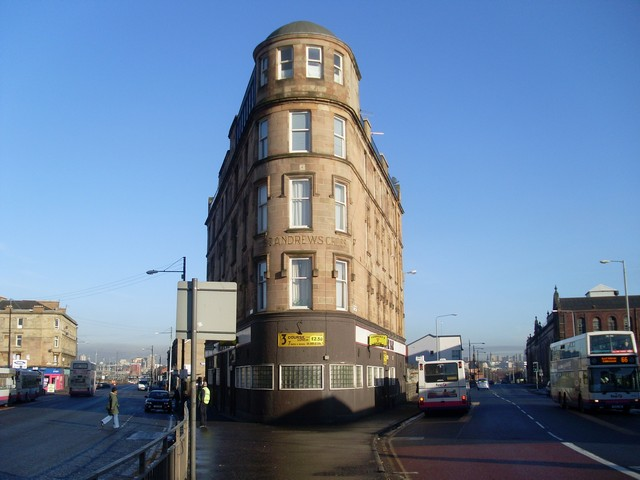
Wedge-shaped tenement (known as a gushet in Scotland) building at the north apex (constructed 1878) displaying 'St Andrew's Cross' lettering

It was named after Saint Andrew due to the junction forming the shape of the saltire.

The alternative name, Eglinton Toll, derives from the cross being the southern entry to the Port Eglinton industrial area (roughly between Pollokshields to the south and Tradeston to the north). As its name suggests, it was intended to be a dock area serving as the Glasgow terminus of a waterway (the Glasgow, Paisley and Johnstone Canal) established in the early 19th century by Hugh Montgomerie, 12th Earl of Eglinton which was intended to run to the coast of Ayrshire; the route was never fully completed and in the 1880s the canal was replaced by a railway (today the Paisley Canal line and the Inverclyde/Ayrshire lines). A major fire occurred at Port Eglinton in 1972. In 2010, the area was bisected by the extended M74 motorway which is carried through on a viaduct supported by large pillars.

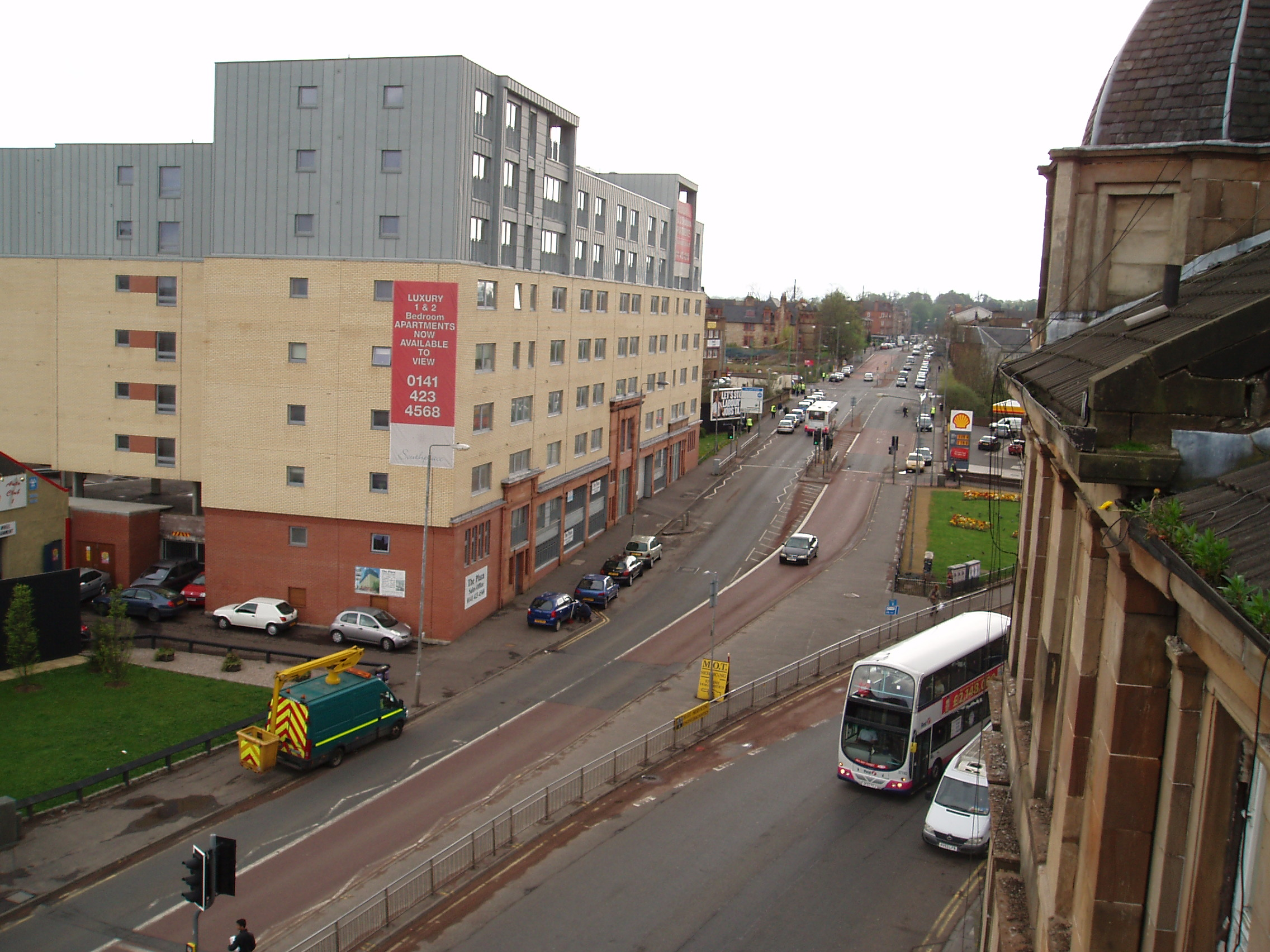
View of the junction looking south, showing modern apartment block on the site of the Plaza Ballroom

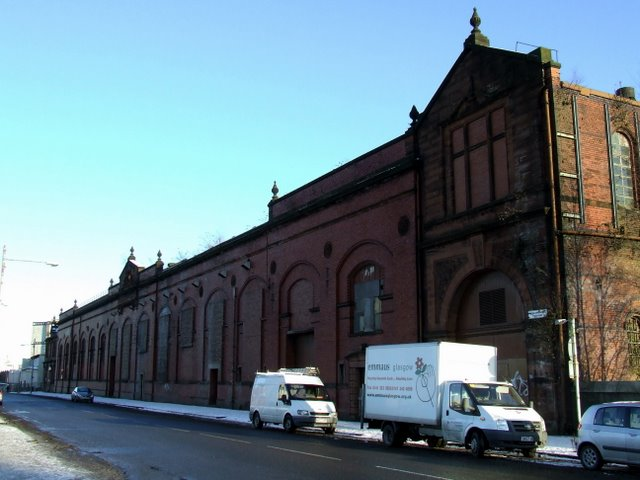
Facade of disused St Andrew's Works (power station / print works)

Several local bus routes (previously also trams) use the roads meeting at the cross, and its proximity to the Larkfield bus depot off Victoria Road made it a popular point for drivers to relieve one another at shift ends, with the Star Bar public house and diner, noted for its bargain meal prices located at its northern apex receiving much of its patronage from them. This practice has become less common since the closure of the depot in 2014, with the new facility, which opened later the same year, located a few blocks further east at Cathcart Road.

The cross also once had a power station, a gasworks, a tram depot (1890s), a cinema and a large dance hall, The Plaza Ballroom, in its vicinity; the latter has since been demolished and replaced by modern apartments which incorporate some of the original red sandstone facade, while part of the power station, which was later adapted by the local council into a printing works, survives but as a derelict structure.

There are several new residential developments nearby at Barrland Street and on the sites of the cinema, the gasworks and Larkfield bus depot. In addition to many buses, Pollokshields East railway station is located a short distance to the south-east, adjacent to the Tramway (arts centre) (based within the tram depot buildings) the headquarters of Scottish Ballet, and the Guru Granth Sahib Sikh Sabha, a major Sikh temple.
