= Pollokshields East railway station =

Railway station in Glasgow, Scotland

Pollokshields East Scottish Gaelic: Pollokshields an Ear
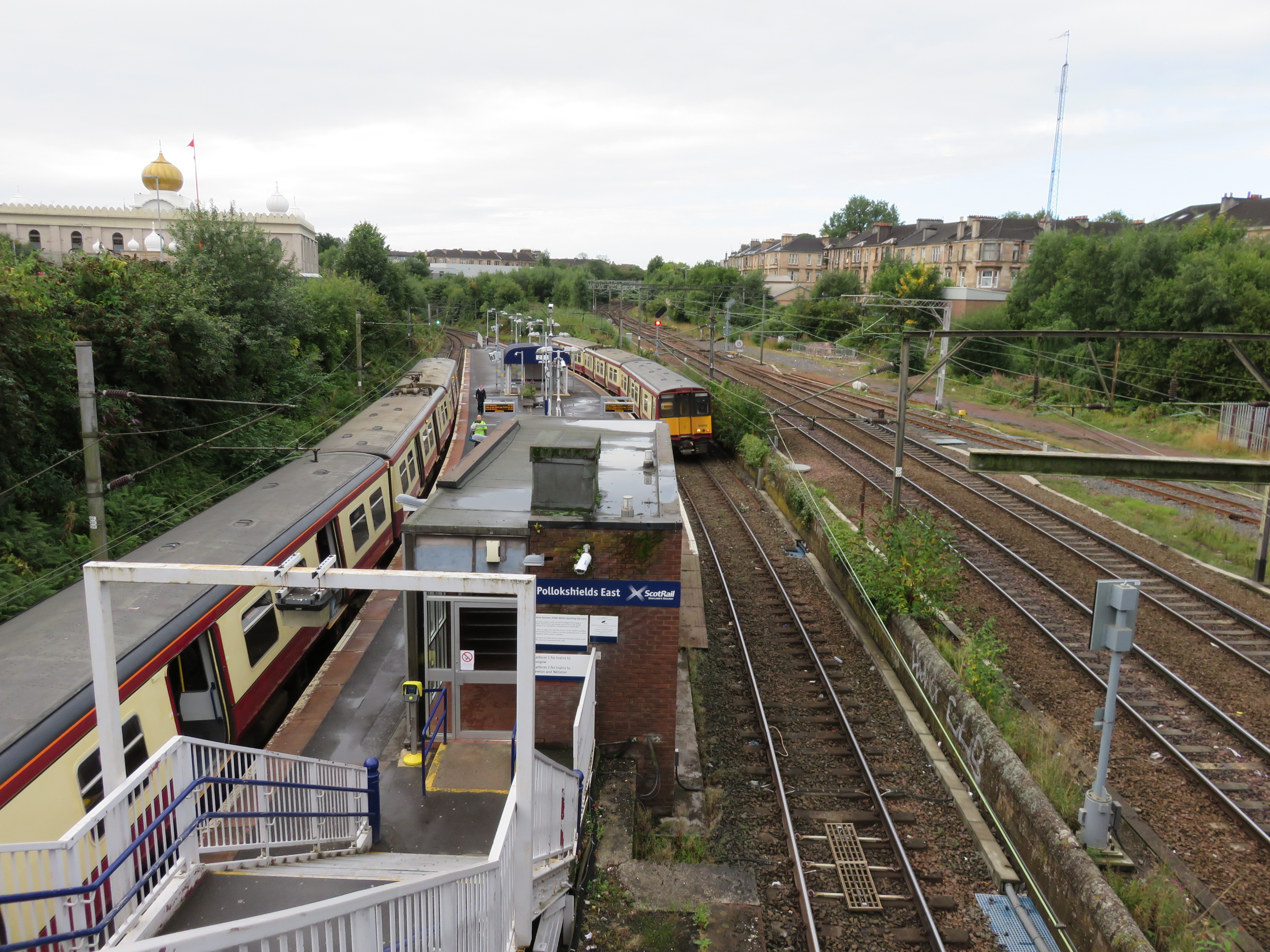
- Looking south towards Queen's Park

General information
- Location: Pollokshields, Glasgow; Scotland
- Coordinates: 55.8407°N 4.2690°W
- Grid reference: NS580632
- Manager: ScotRail
- Transit authority: SPT
- Platforms: 2
- Tracks: 4

Other information
- Station code: PLE
- Fare zone: 1

History
- Pre-grouping: Caledonian Railway
- Post-grouping: LMS

Key dates
- 1 March 1886: Opened
- 1 January 1917: Closed
- 1 June 1919: Reopened

Passengers
- 2021/22: ▲0.205 million
- 2022/23: ▲0.256 million
- 2023/24: ▲0.326 million
- 2024/25: ▲0.338 million
- 2025/26: ▲0.367 million
Location
Notes
- Passenger statistics from the Office of Rail and Road

Pollokshields East railway station is one of three railway stations serving Pollokshields in Glasgow, Scotland. The station is managed by ScotRail and lies on the Cathcart Circle Line.

== History ==
The station opened concurrently with the Cathcart District Railway, on 1 March 1886 and was the first of two stations on the Cathcart Circle serving the area to be built (nearby Pollokshields West opened eight years later on the western side of the Circle). It was closed as a wartime economy measure during World War 1 between January 1917 and June 1919. The 1923 Grouping saw ownership pass to the London, Midland and Scottish Railway and then onto the Scottish Region of British Railways in January 1948. Many trains over the route began to be worked by diesel multiple units from the summer of 1958, with overhead electrification following in 1962. A line voltage of 6.25 kV A.C was used south of there initially due to clearance issues with the bridges & cuttings along the route, though this was subsequently increased to the standard 25 kV in the early 1970s.

On the evening of 10 December 1945, two station staff were killed and a third injured in a shooting and robbery.

The original station building was badly damaged by fire in April 1976 and was subsequently rebuilt in contemporary style by British Rail.

== Services ==
=== 2016 ===
A typical weekday and Saturday service is five trains per hour to Glasgow Central (one train per hour in each direction on the Cathcart Circle, two from Neilston and one from Newton via Kirkhill), two trains per hour to Neilston and one train per hour to Newton (the one other hourly train to/from Newton runs via Langside). A Sunday service is almost the same except the Cathcart Circle trains do not operate. As a result, only three trains per hour operate to Glasgow Central.

=== Routes ===
Preceding station	National Rail	Following station
Queen's Park	ScotRail; Cathcart Circle	Glasgow Central
	Historical railways	
Queen's Park; Line and station open	Caledonian Railway; Cathcart District Railway	Eglinton Street; Line open; station closed

== See also ==
- Pollokshields railway station
- Pollokshields West railway station
