= Queens Park railway station (Scotland) =

Railway station in Glasgow, Scotland

Queens Park (Glasgow) Scottish Gaelic: Pàirc na Banrighinn
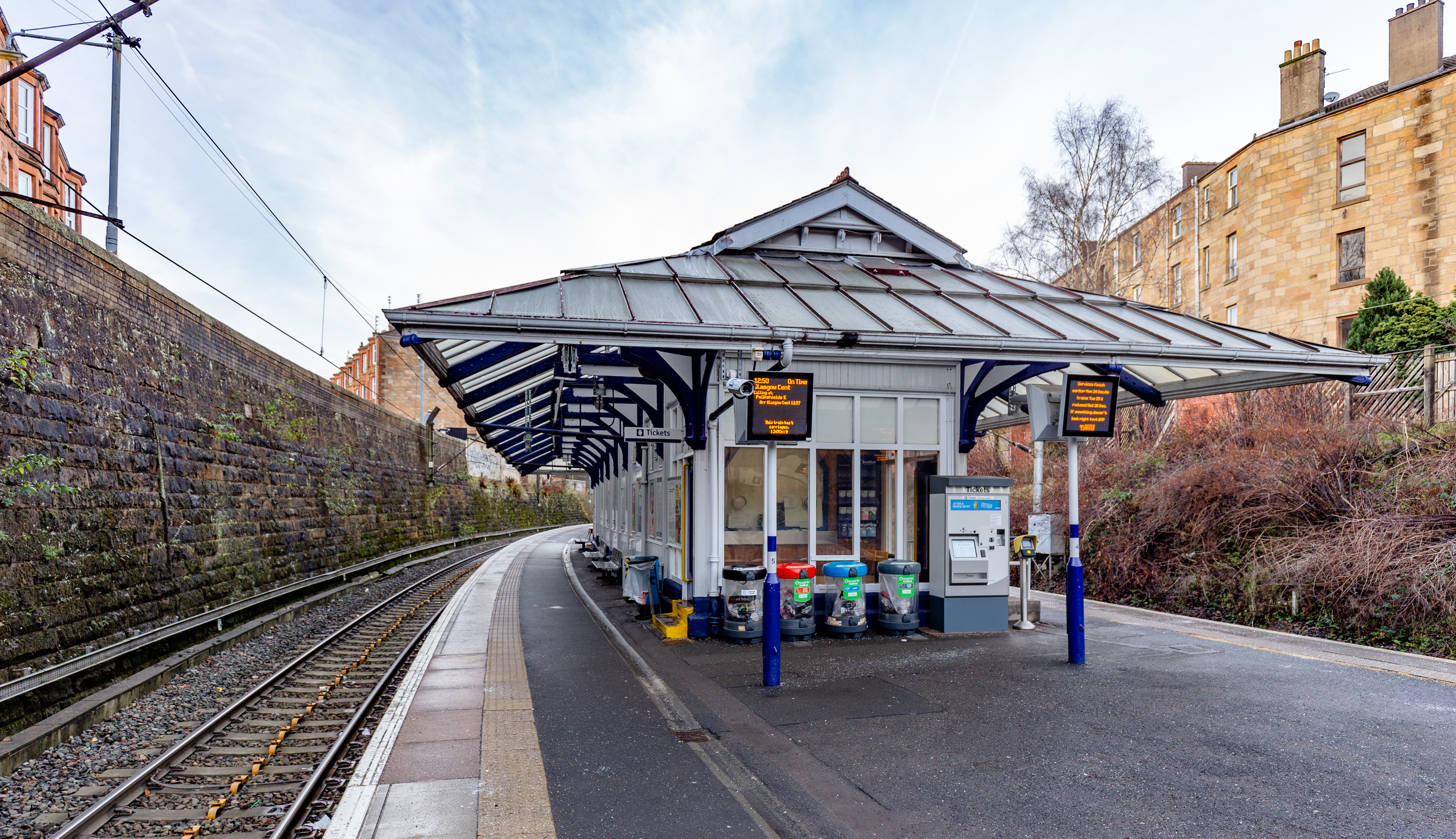
- Looking north west towards Pollokshields East

General information
- Location: Queen's Park, Glasgow; Scotland
- Coordinates: 55.8353°N 4.2669°W
- Grid reference: NS581625
- Manager: ScotRail
- Transit authority: SPT
- Platforms: 2

Other information
- Station code: QPK
- Fare zone: 1

History
- Original company: Cathcart District Railway
- Pre-grouping: Caledonian Railway
- Post-grouping: LMS

Key dates
- 1 March 1886: Opened

Passengers
- 2021/22: ▲0.408 million
- 2022/23: ▲0.519 million
- 2023/24: ▲0.670 million
- 2024/25: ▲0.729 million
- 2025/26: ▲0.769 million
Location
Notes
- Passenger statistics from the Office of Rail and Road

Queens Park railway station is a railway station serving the Queen's Park, Govanhill and Strathbungo areas of Glasgow, Scotland. It is located on the Cathcart Circle Line. Services are provided by ScotRail on behalf of Strathclyde Partnership for Transport.

== History ==
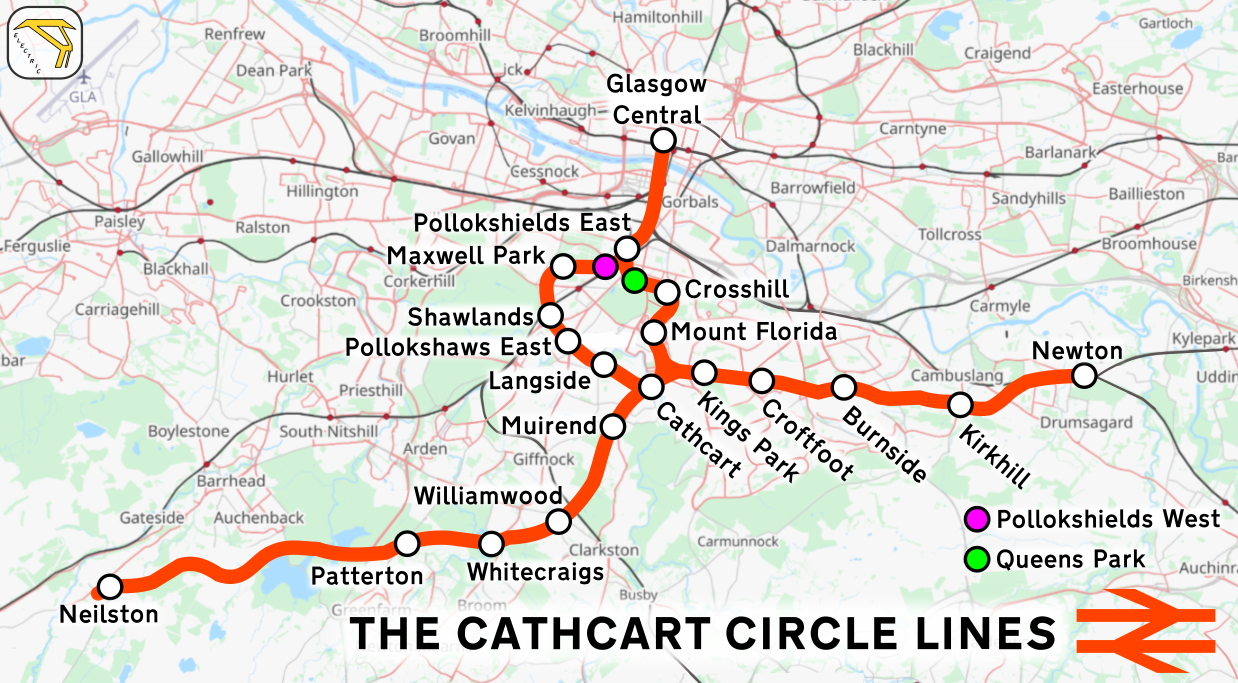
Cathcart Circle Lines route map

Queen's Park station opened with the first section of the Cathcart District Railway, which opened as far as Mount Florida on 1 March 1886 (the line through to the first Cathcart station opened a few months later, on 25 May 1886). The station maintains its original island platform and station building to this day.

The lines through the station were electrified under British Railways as part of the Glasgow South Bank Electrification in May 1962.

From July to August 2008, the Cathcart Circle was closed for a short period to allow for subsidence repair works near Pollokshields East railway station. During this closure, Queen's Park was, along with several other stations on the line, one of the first to receive the new ScotRail colours and signage that would replace Strathclyde Partnership for Transport and the incumbent franchise holder's branding.

Queen's Park station is now protected as a category B listed building. In 2011, part of the station was converted to house Queen's Park Railway Club, a contemporary art space.

In 2018 through 2019, over 750,000 passenger journeys were recorded going to or coming from Queen’s Park Station.

== Services ==
=== 1979 ===
Service provision consisted of two trains per hour between Neilston and Glasgow Central, two trains per hours between Newton and Glasgow Central, two trains per hour serving the Cathcart Inner Circle and two trains per hour serving the Cathcart Outer Circle Service.

=== 2016 ===
Service provision consists of two trains per hour between Neilston and Glasgow Central, one train per hour between Newton and Glasgow Central, one train per hour serving the Cathcart Inner Circle and one train per hour serving the Cathcart Outer Circle Service. The Circle services do not operate on Sundays, so the overall frequency at the station drops to 3 per hour each way.

=== Routes ===
Preceding station	National Rail	Following station
Crosshill	ScotRail; Cathcart Circle	Pollokshields East
	Historical railways	
Crosshill; Line and station open	Caledonian Railway; Cathcart District Railway	Pollokshields East; Line and station open
