= Glasgow Central railway station =

Principal railway station in Glasgow, Scotland

Glasgow Central Glaschu Mheadhain
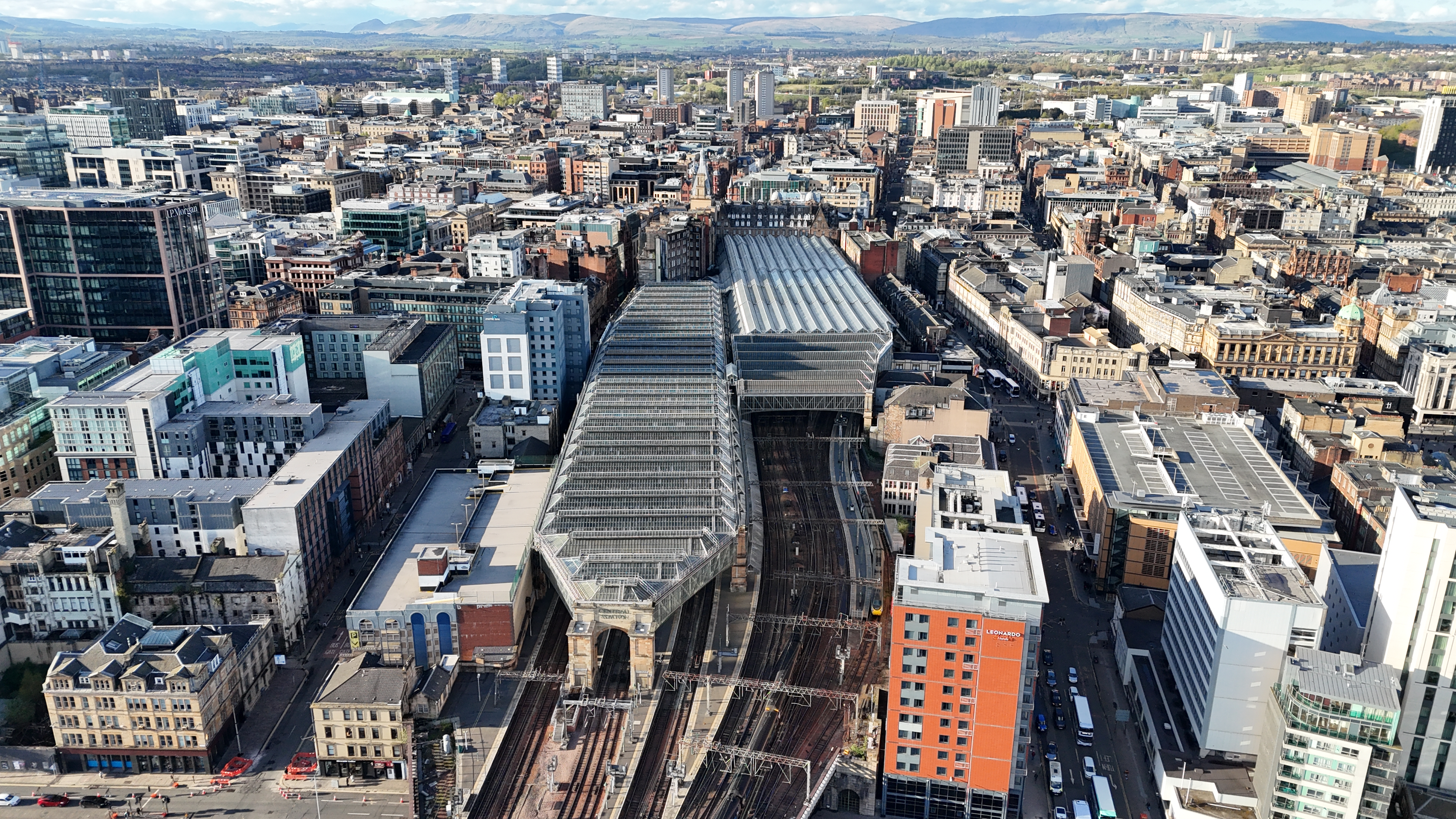
- Aerial view of Glasgow Central station

General information
- Location: Glasgow, Scotland
- Coordinates: 55°51′37″N 4°15′29″W
- Grid reference: NS586651
- Manager: Network Rail
- Transit authority: SPT
- Platforms: 17 (including 2 on lower level)

Other information
- Station code: GLC
- Fare zone: 1

Key dates
- 1 August 1879: High Level station opened
- 10 August 1896: Low Level station opened
- 1901–1905: High Level station rebuilt
- 1960: Resignalling
- 5 October 1964: Closure of Low Level station
- May 1974: Start of Electric Scot services to London Euston
- 5 November 1979: Reopening of Low Level station as part of Argyle Line
- 1984–1986: Refurbished
- 1998–2005: Refurbished

Passengers
- 2021/22: ▲15.322 million
- 2022/23: ▲20.768 million
- 2023/24: ▲24.964 million
- 2024/25: ▲25.294 million
- 2025/26: ▼25.064 million
Location
Notes
- Passenger statistics from the Office of Rail and Road. Station usage figures saw a large decrease in 2020/21 due to the COVID-19 pandemic

Glasgow Central (Scottish Gaelic: Glaschu Mheadhain), usually referred to in Scotland as just Central or Central Station, is one of two principal main line rail terminals in Glasgow, Scotland. With 25 million passengers in 2024–2025, it is the seventeenth-busiest railway station in Britain and the busiest in Scotland, as well as the third-busiest station in the UK outside of London, behind Birmingham New Street and Manchester Piccadilly. The station is protected as a category A listed building.

The station was opened by the Caledonian Railway on 1 August 1879 and is one of 20 managed by Network Rail. It is the northern terminus of the West Coast Main Line (397 miles or 639 kilometres north of London Euston). As well as being Glasgow's principal inter-city terminus for services to England, Central also serves the southern suburbs of the Greater Glasgow conurbation, and the Ayrshire and Clyde coasts. The other main station in the city is Glasgow Queen Street, which primarily serves regional and inter-city services to the north of Glasgow. The three letter station code is GLC.

In Britain's 100 Best Railway Stations by Simon Jenkins, the station was one of only ten to be awarded five stars. In 2017, the station received a customer satisfaction score of 95.2%, the highest in the UK.

== History ==
=== Original station ===
Caledonian Railway (Gordon Street, Glasgow Station) Act 1873
- Act of Parliament
- Parliament of the United Kingdom
- Long title: An Act for enabling the Caledonian Railway Company to make a Station at Gordon Street, Glasgow, and Connecting Lines between the same and their Railways on the south side of that city; and for other purposes.
- Citation: 36 & 37 Vict. c. clxxxviii

Dates
- Royal assent: 21 July 1873

Text of statute as originally enacted

The original station, opened on 1 August 1879 on the north bank of the River Clyde, had eight platforms and was linked to Bridge Street station by a railway bridge over Argyle Street and a four-track railway bridge, built by Sir William Arrol, which crossed the Clyde to the south. The station was built over the site of Grahamston village, whose central street (Alston Street) was demolished to make way for the station platform.

The station was soon congested. In 1890, a temporary solution of widening the bridge over Argyle Street and inserting a ninth platform on Argyle Street bridge was completed. It was also initially intended to increase Bridge Street station to eight through lines and to increase Central station to 13 platforms.

=== Low-level station ===
Originally built as a separate station, there were two island platforms making four platform faces, and a siding to the north. The station was built to serve the underground Glasgow Central Railway, authorised on 10 August 1888 and opened on 10 August 1896. The Glasgow Central Railway was taken over by the Caledonian Railway in 1890. Services ran from Maryhill Central and from the Lanarkshire and Dunbartonshire Railway in the west through to Rutherglen and via Tollcross through to Carmyle, Newton and other Caledonian Railway destinations to the east of Glasgow. Other stations include Cambuslang and Motherwell.

=== 1901–1905 station rebuild ===
By 1900, the station was again found to be too small, passenger numbers per annum on the high-level station having increased by 5.156 million since the first extension was completed in 1890. Passenger usage per annum in 1899 was 16.841 million on the high-level station and 6.416 million on the low-level station, a total of 23.257 million. The station is on two levels: the High-Level station at the same level as Gordon Street, which bridges over Argyle Street, and the underground Low-Level station.

Between 1901 and 1905, the original station was rebuilt. The station was extended over the top of Argyle Street and thirteen platforms were built. An additional eight-track bridge, the Caledonian Railway Bridge, was built over the Clyde, and the original bridge was raised by 30 inches (0.75 m). Bridge Street station was then closed.

Also, during the 1901–1905 rebuild, a series of sidings was created at the end of platforms 11 and 12 on the bridge over the River Clyde. These were named West Bank Siding, Mid Bank Siding and East Bank Siding. A dock siding, No. 14 Dock, was created at the south end of platform 13.

Central station has a spacious concourse containing shops, catering outlets, ticket offices and a travel centre. It is fronted by the Central Hotel on Gordon Street, designed by Robert Rowand Anderson. The station building also houses a long line of shops and bars down the Union Street side. The undercroft of the station is not open to the general public, except through regular official tours, and houses private car-parking and utility functions for the station and the adjoining Central Hotel.

The station's famous architectural features are the large glass-walled bridge that takes the station building over Argyle Street, nicknamed the 'Hielanman's Umbrella' (Highlandman's Umbrella) because it was used as a meeting place for highlanders living in the city; and the former ticket office and information building. This was a large oval building, with the booking office on the ground floor and the train information display for passengers on large printed cloth destination boards placed behind large windows on the first floor by a team of two men. Underneath the "Umbrella" are a number of shops and bars. The Arches, a one-time nightclub, theatre, gallery and restaurant complex, was also located below the station.

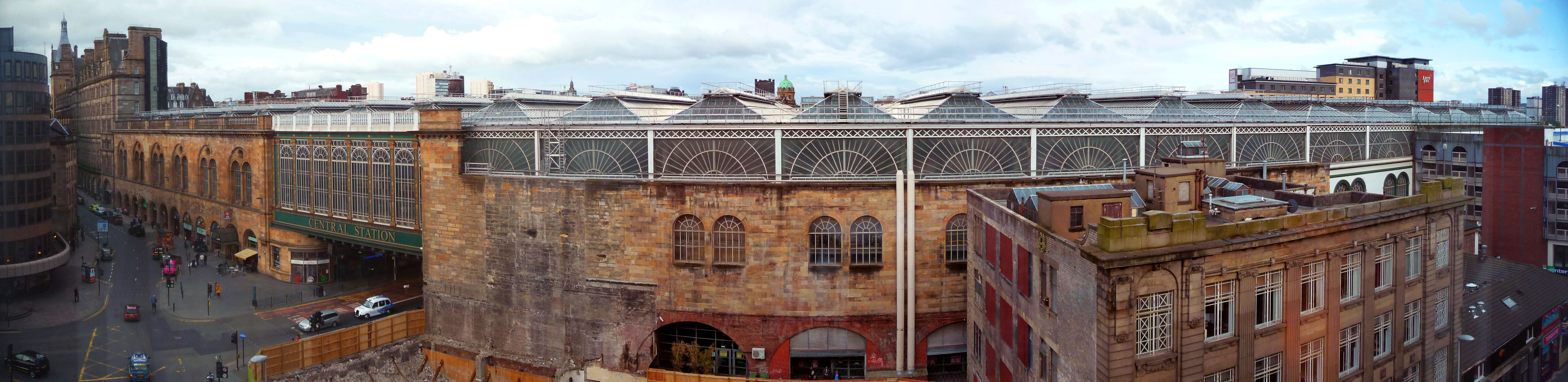
View of Central station from 5th floor of Radisson SAS hotel, with the distinctive facade of the Hielanman's Umbrella and Argyle Street passing under it in the centre, May 2009

=== Railway electrification ===
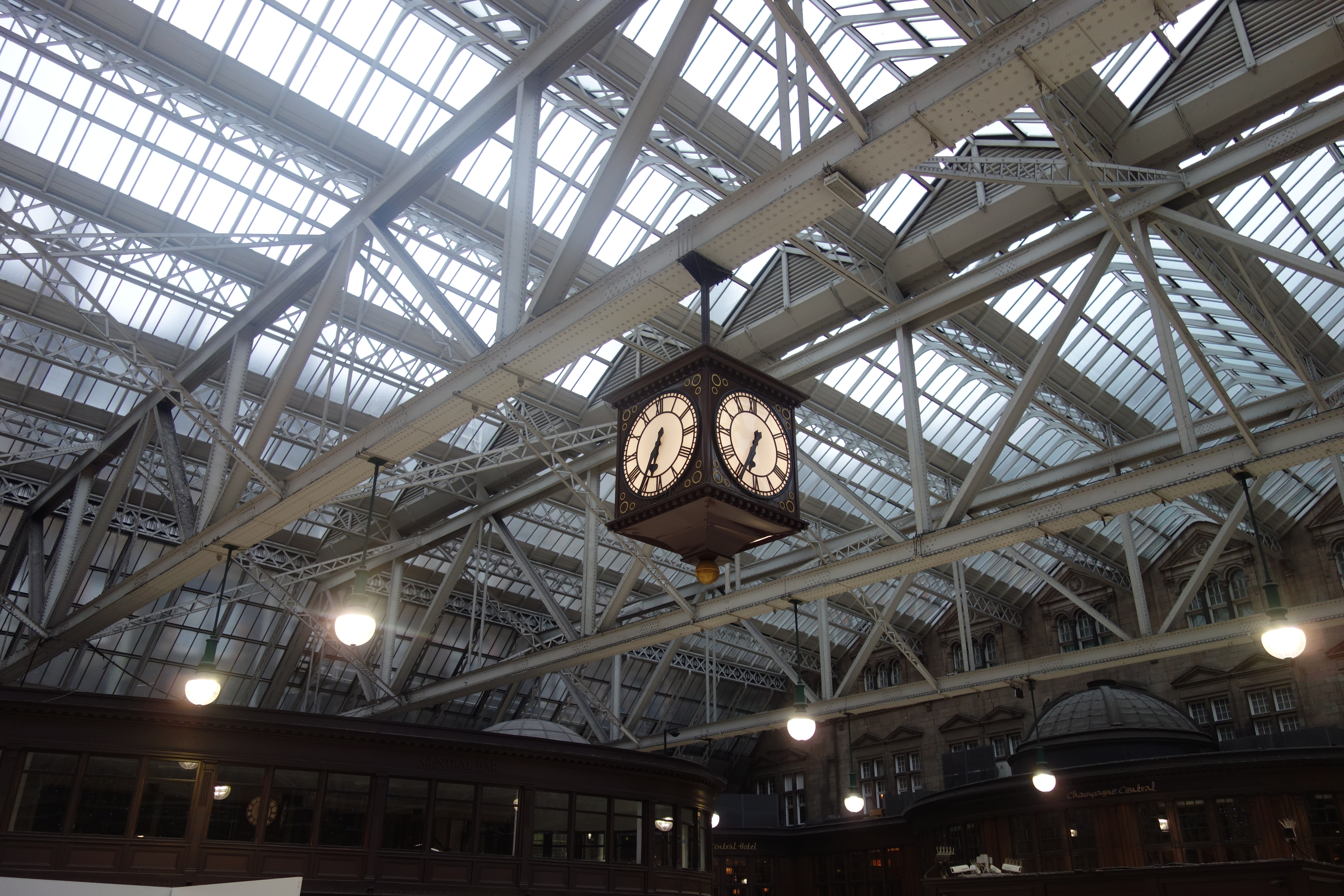
Roof construction and railway clock

Overhead power lines began to appear on the high-level platforms in the early 1960s under British Railways. Firstly came 6.25 kV AC overhead power lines from the Cathcart Circle Line electrification scheme, which started on 29 May 1962. During this period, the old 1879 bridge over the River Clyde was removed and the railway lines were rearranged.

This was followed by the 25 kV AC overhead-power-lines electrification of the Glasgow and Paisley Joint Railway and the Inverclyde Line to Gourock and Wemyss Bay, completed in 1967. The WCML northern electrification scheme started on 6 May 1974. Part of the Cathcart Circle was upgraded to 25 kV AC supply in 1974, to provide a diversionary route; the whole of the Cathcart Circle route was later upgraded to that supply.

Plans to electrify other routes, such as the Whifflet Line, as part of a scheme to improve rail services in Scotland, were completed in November 2014.

== 20th–century ==
=== Low-level station ===
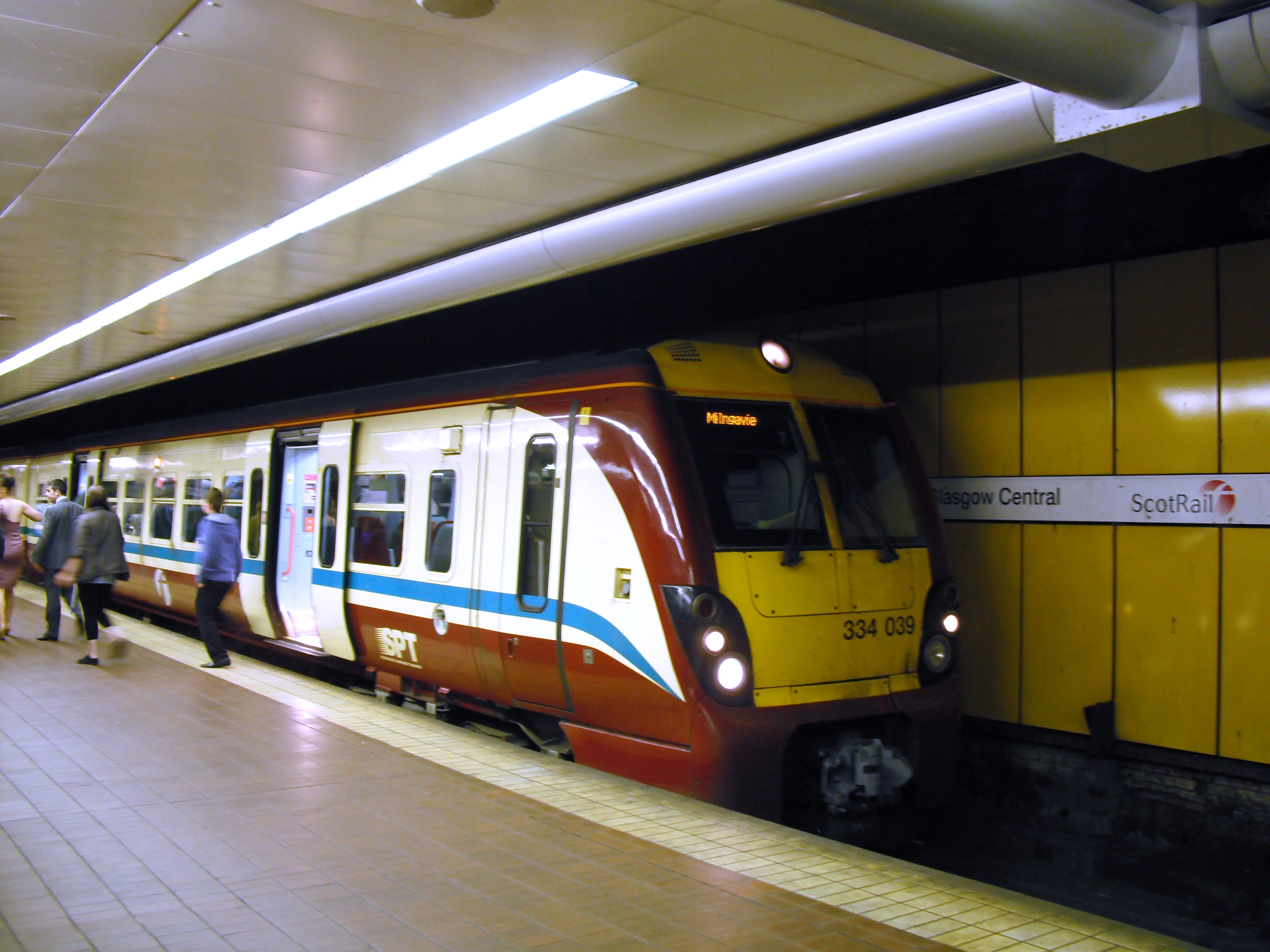
A Class 334 with an Argyle Line service at Glasgow Central Low-level

==== Closure ====
Services through the Low-Level station, initially generous, had been greatly reduced due to competition with the extensive and efficient Glasgow Corporation tram system well before the withdrawal of service at the Low-Level station on 3 October 1964 under the Beeching Axe. The trams themselves had been replaced by buses by 1962.

==== Reopening ====
In 1979, part of the low-level line was electrified and the Low-Level station was re-opened as the Argyle Line of the Glasgow suburban railway network. It consisted of the southern island platform with the original northern island platform and siding remaining closed. Changes to the original track layout had to be made to allow the southern island platform to serve eastbound and westbound trains as the platform was previously only served by westbound trains. The reopened island platform was numbered as platforms 14 and 15; they were later renumbered to 16 and 17 respectively when the project to resignal and add two additional platforms to the higher level took place in 2008.

Initially services were provided by Class 303 and Class 314 units. The latter were built specifically for this service. Following the withdrawal of the Class 303 units, the service was provided by Class 318 and Class 334 Juniper units.

Class 320 units were intended to be used on the route but, due to the position of the original driver's monitors for checking doors, this proved impossible. Therefore, these units were restricted to the North Clyde Line. This changed in 2011 with a programme of works carried out to enable the Class 320 units to work through the station in passenger service. The Class 320 and 318 units between them now provide the majority of Argyle Line services, with most 334s having moved to operate the Airdrie-Bathgate Rail Link.

==== Flooding of the Low-Level line ====
Over the Christmas festive period of 1994, on 11 December, torrential rain caused the River Kelvin to burst its banks at the closed Kelvinbridge station, with the water making its way through the disused tunnels to Exhibition Centre and the Low-Level station, which was completely submerged by the resultant flash flood. It was closed until 24 September 1995 while repairs were made.

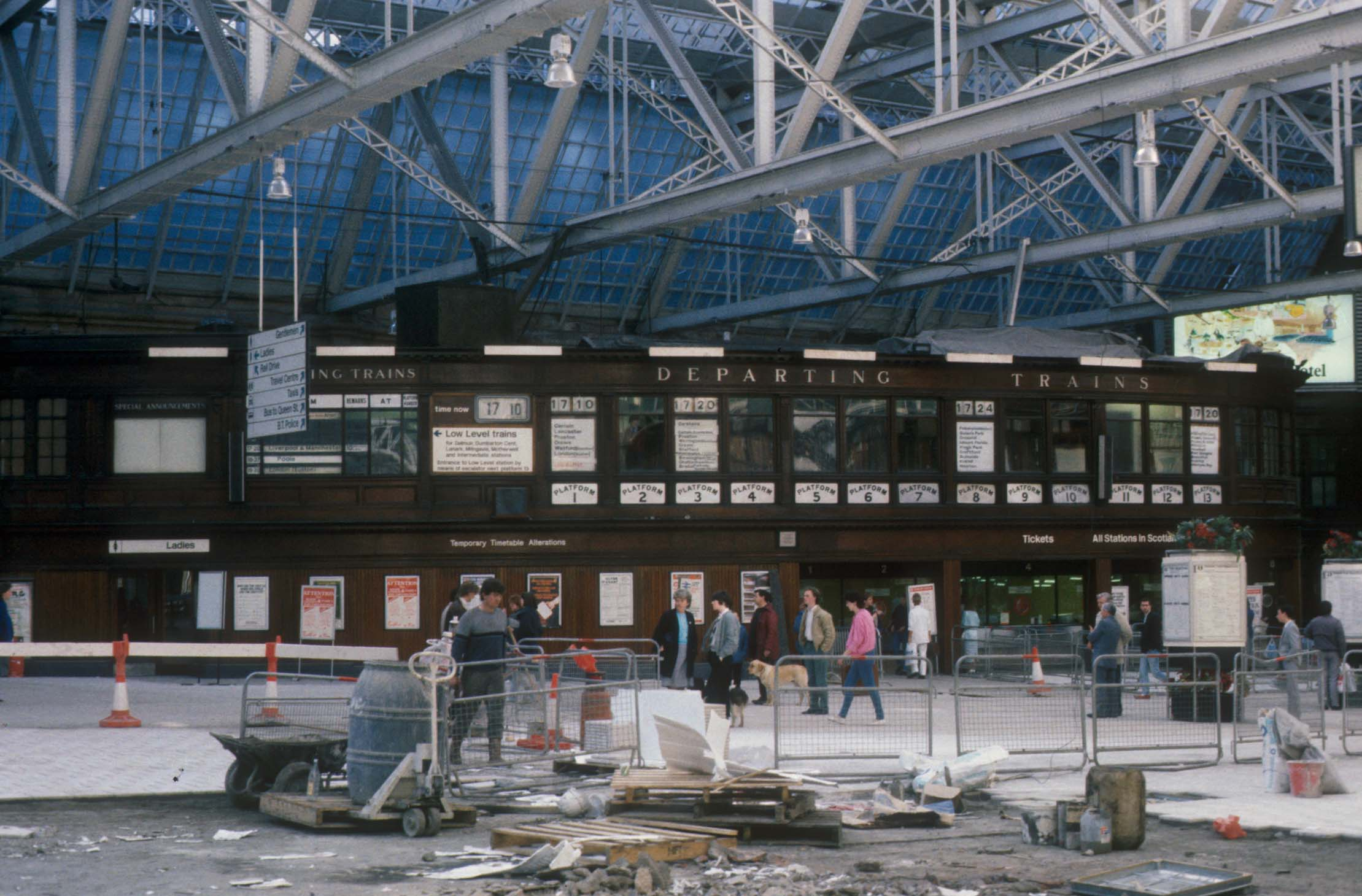
The Caledonian Railway destination board still in use during the 1985 refurbishment

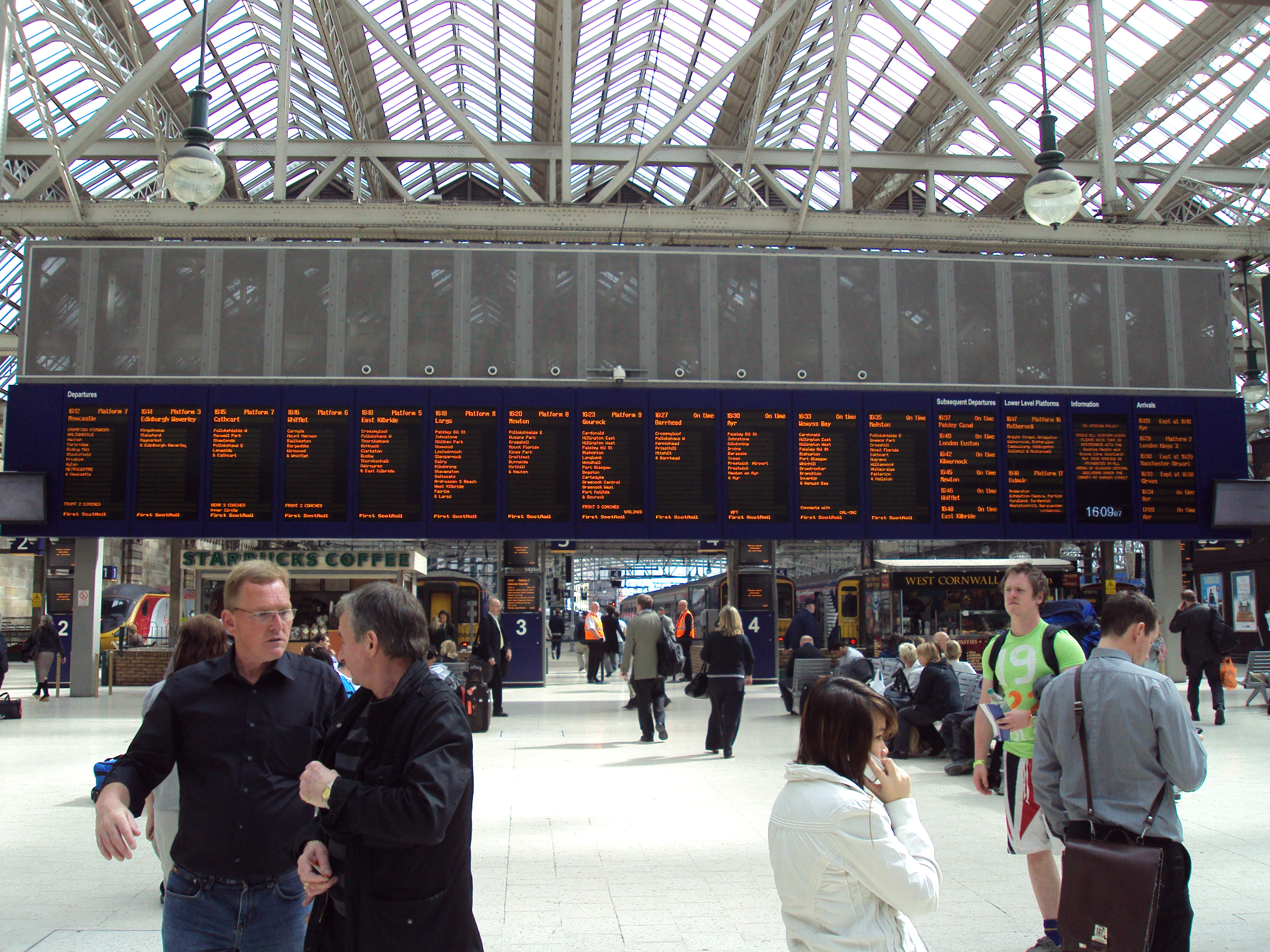
The 2005 LED-style departure board above the ends of platforms 2 to 5

In August 2002, torrential rain flooded out the low-level stations from Dalmarnock through to Exhibition Centre for a number of weeks. Most services were routed to the high-level platforms or to Queen Street station. The 2002 Glasgow floods had a number of other effects, causing a cryptospiridium outbreak in the city's water supply.

=== Refurbishments ===
The high-level station's facilities were substantially redeveloped in the mid-1980s. The old ticket office / train information building was replaced in 1985 by an all-new Travel Centre adjacent to the Gordon Street entrance. By 1986, a large electro-mechanical destination board at the end of the platforms, with a smaller repeater board at the western side of the concourse, had replaced the former manually operated train-information boards. The old booking office / train information building was retained and redeveloped into shops, eateries and an upstairs bar/restaurant, and the station was re-floored in marble. During this redevelopment the staffed ticket barriers at Platforms 1 to 8 were removed and the yellow ticket automatic barriers were removed from Platforms 9 to 13 (now 15).

In 1998, a five-year renovation programme was initiated by Railtrack, which saw the trainshed completely re-roofed and internally refurbished by Bovis Lend Lease – which also included the restoration of Hielanman's Umbrella. The 1980s vintage mechanical pixel-style destination boards were later replaced around 2005 with an array of LED-style destination boards. The final improvement, the upgrading of the upstairs restaurant area, was completed in 2005.

== 21st-century ==
=== Layout ===
Platform 1 is at the east end and platform 15 is located at the west end of the station; platforms 16 and 17 are directly underneath the station's high level platforms. Platforms 1 and 2 are usually used by longer distance cross-border services operated by Avanti West Coast, TransPennine Express and CrossCountry, while platforms 3 to 6 are used mainly by services to Lanark, Edinburgh, East Kilbride, Barrhead, Kilmarnock, Carlisle, Girvan, and Stranraer. Platforms 7–10 are used by services which operate along the Cathcart Circle and also Neilston and Newton, but other services are known to use them as well. Platforms 11–15 are used mostly by services to Ayr, Largs, Ardrossan, Gourock, Wemyss Bay and Paisley Canal. Platform 11 is used as a relief platform for Avanti West Coast services if platforms 1 or 2 cannot be used.

All of the high level platforms are divided into three sections: front, middle and rear; these are used when two or three trains are occupying the same platform.

=== 2009–2010 expansion ===
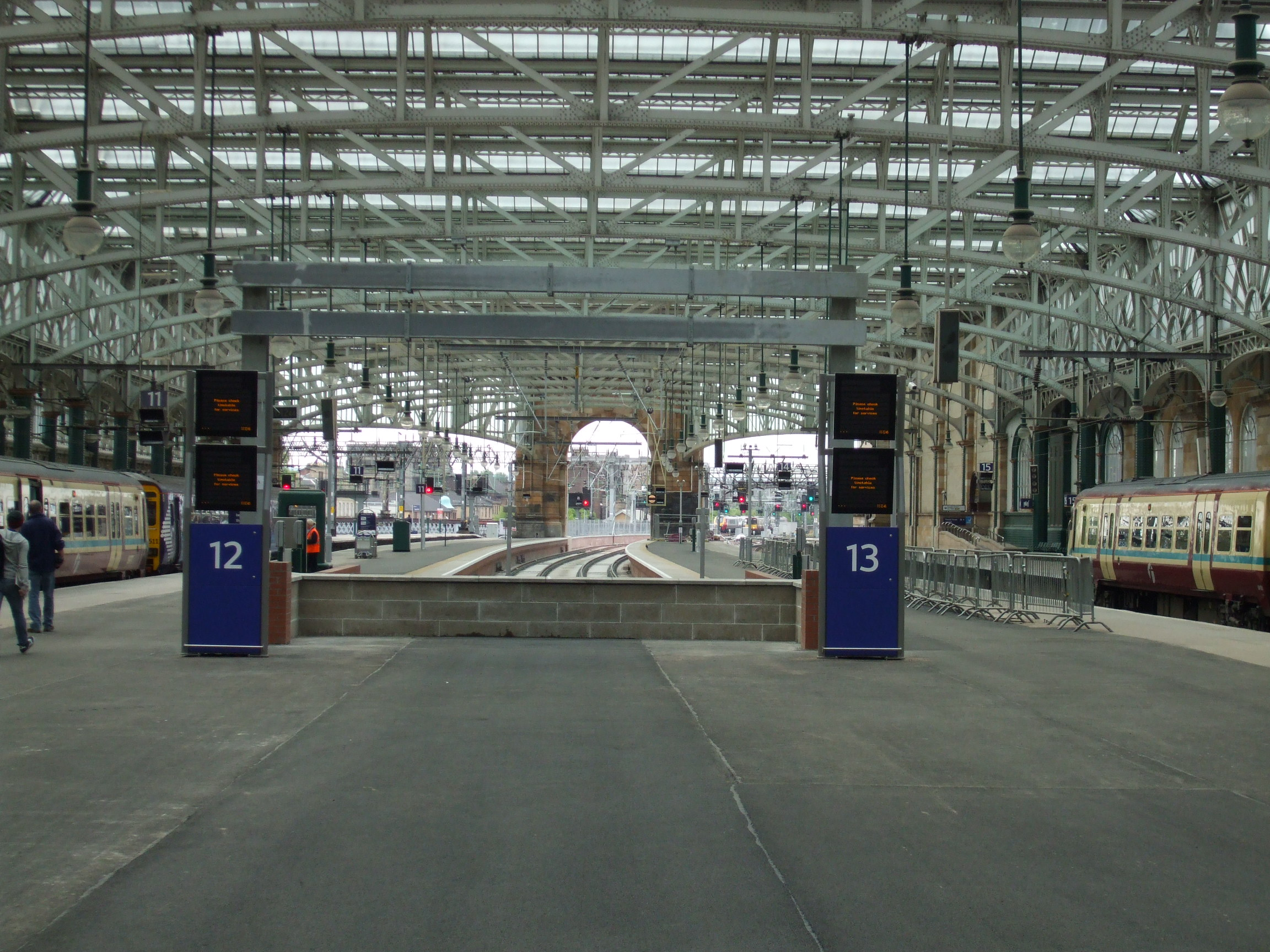
The new platforms 12 and 13 in the first week after being brought into use

To accommodate the cancelled Glasgow Airport Rail Link plans, the platforms were renumbered. Platform 11a (the previous West Bank Siding, on the bridge over the Clyde) was renumbered 12, whilst 12 & 13 were renumbered 14 & 15 respectively. In September 2009 the former platform-level car park and passenger drop-off area was taken out of use and the platform over the Clyde (recently renumbered 12) was removed. Two new platforms were created between 11 and 14, being brought into use in May 2010. There is no plan to replace indoor parking or passenger drop-off within Central station. The existing multi-storey parking facility on Oswald Street and on-street parking surrounding Central station remain, with passenger drop-off having moved to surrounding streets. During Cyclone Bodil in December 2013, the glass roof of the station was broken by flying debris.

=== Barriers ===
Automatic ticket barriers were installed at Glasgow Central and three other city-centre stations from 2011 as part of a crackdown on fare-dodging to increase ticket revenue. This follows barriers being erected at Queen Street station in 2004, ending ScotRail's open stations policy under which staffed and previous yellow ticket automatic barriers had been scrapped during the 1980s to encourage more passengers; tickets were checked on trains instead. ScotRail finalised negotiations with Network Rail over the project in June 2010, with the project completed in February 2012, covering High Level Platforms 3 to 15 and Low Level Platforms 16 and 17. Platforms 1 and 2 were left without barriers, as they are mostly used by long-distance express services with a high proportion of passengers carrying heavy luggage.

=== Recent developments ===
In November 2023, Network Rail renewed the concourse departure screens, replacing the 2005 style boards. The new ones were similar to the screens at Glasgow Queen Street. The concourse is due to receive minor refurbishment which will be carried out between late 2023 and late 2024. This work will create better retail space, a new multi faith room and a relocated station reception. Low Level platforms 16 and 17 will be refreshed, similar to the works carried out at Anderston in 2022.

=== 2026 fire ===
On 8 March 2026, a major fire broke out in a vape shop in an adjoining five-storey building on Union Street, leading to a partial building collapse and severely disrupting rail service at the station. Senior fire officer David Farries and council leader Susan Aitken both credited firefighters with preventing the fire spreading to the station and the Grand Central Hotel.

== Features ==
=== Central Hotel ===
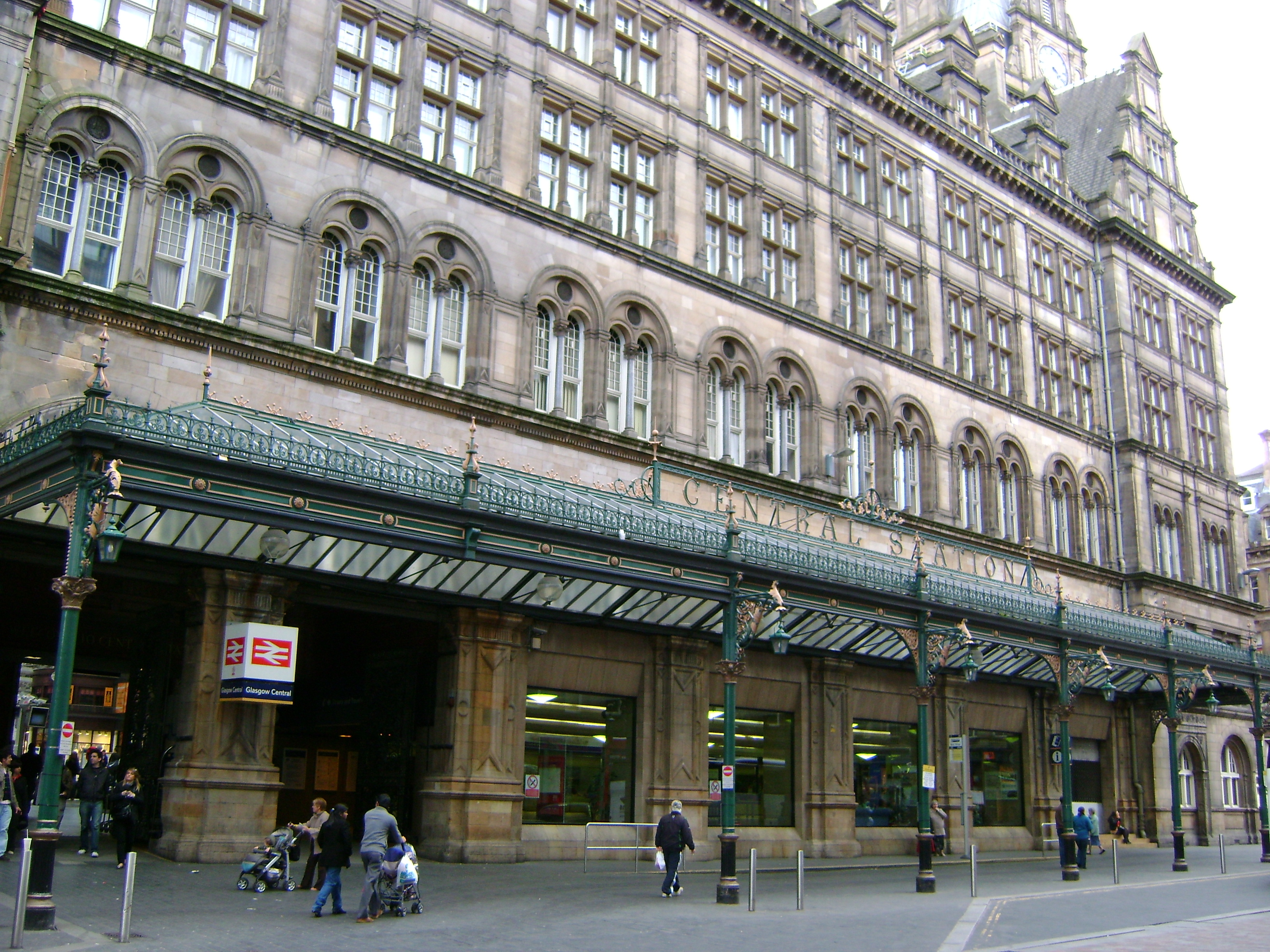
The Gordon Street entrance, with the Central Hotel above it

Central station is fronted by the Central Hotel on Gordon Street. Adjoining onto the station concourse, it was one of Glasgow's most prestigious hotels in its heyday.

It was originally designed by Robert Rowand Anderson, in 'Queen Anne style'; he also furnished the public rooms. The hotel was completed in 1883, but was extended along with the station in 1901–1906. The hotel extension was designed by James Miller and it opened on 15 April 1907.

The world's first long-distance television pictures were transmitted to the Central Hotel in the station, on 24 May 1927 by John Logie Baird. The hotel was sold by British Rail in the 1980s, and passed through the hands of various private operators until its most recent owner, the Real Hotel Group, went into administration in February 2009, and the hotel subsequently closed amid concerns of asbestos contamination and structural deterioration.

In June 2009, a new company acquired the hotel building, and worked to refurbish and rebrand it as the Glasgow Grand Central Hotel. The refurbished hotel re-opened in September 2010. In 2021 it was refurbished by IHG Hotels & Resorts and rebranded voco Grand Central Hotel.

=== Signalling ===
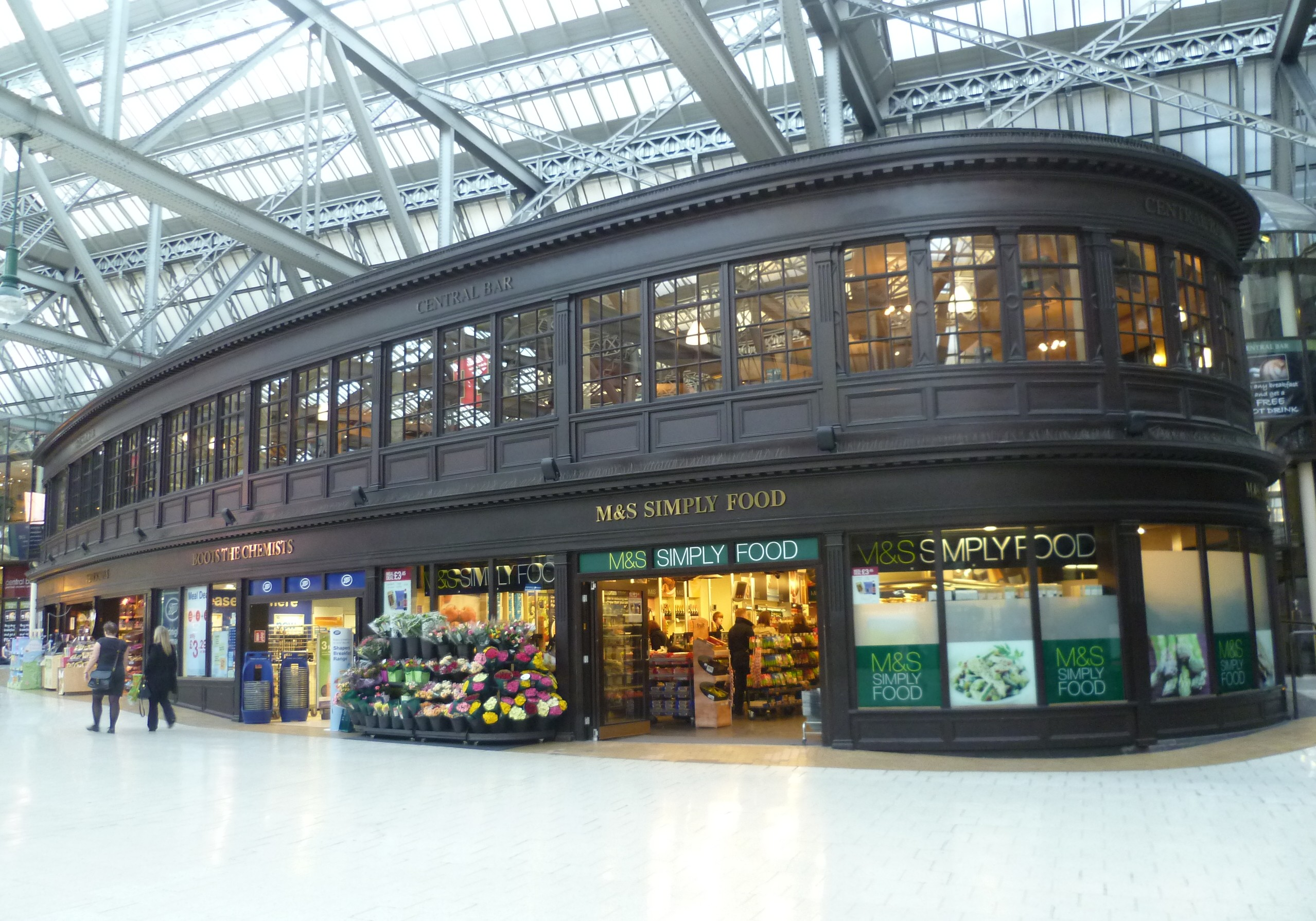
The Edwardian-era booking office and train information building

The original 1889 signal box was replaced with an electro-pneumatic power-operated box based on the Westinghouse system. Work started in October 1907 and it opened on 5 April 1908. It was built directly over the River Clyde, sitting between the two river bridges, above the level of the tracks. Inside was a frame of 374 miniature levers, making it the longest power frame ever built in Great Britain.

Glasgow Central Signalling Centre, located in the "vee" of Bridge Street Junction, opened on 2 January 1961. It replaced signal boxes at Central Station, Bridge Street Junction, Eglinton Street Junction and Eglinton Street Station. When initially opened it was capable of handling 1,000 routes.

The new signalling centre was needed for three reasons:

- The 1907 power signal box was worn out;
- The original 1879 bridge over the River Clyde was coming to the end of its useful life, and it was more effective to use the newer (1904) bridge to handle all the traffic, with the lines signalled bi-directionally;
- Electrification of the Cathcart Circle Lines, and subsequently the Gourock and Wemyss Bay services and the West Coast Main Line.

In addition to the removal of the east river bridge, the scissor crossovers through the station, the Cathcart Engine siding, East Bank Siding, Mid Bank Siding and No. 14 Dock were removed. The West Bank Siding was numbered as Platform 11a.

Glasgow Central Signalling Centre closed on 27 December 2008, when its area of control was transferred to the new West of Scotland Signalling Centre (WSSC) at Cowlairs. The NX panel is to be preserved. The station is currently signalled by two Westinghouse Westlock Interlockings which are controlled via an Alstom MCS control system.

=== Station tours ===
Following the success of the Doors Open day event in summer 2013, tours of the station several times each week began in November 2014. These 90-minute tours cover the roof, plus the catacombs, vaults, and a view of disused platforms below the station.

=== Piano garden ===
In December 2017, McLaren's Pianos gave a piano to the station on permanent loan, which is available to the public to play. This area is referred to as the "Piano Garden" and is located directly behind the mobility assistance booth.

=== Station ticket facilities ===
There are three ticket halls: two are operated by ScotRail (main concourse and Argyle Street entrance) and the third is a travel centre run by Avanti West Coast adjacent to platforms 1 and 2. Avanti West Coast also operates a dedicated customer lounge, next to platform 1, and a First Class lounge.

== Services ==
Glasgow Central is served by five train operating companies. ScotRail uses both the high level and low level platforms; all other operators use the high level only. The general service pattern for Monday-Friday off-peak in trains per hour/day is:

=== ScotRail ===
High Level:

- 2 tph to Lanark, via Motherwell and Wishaw
- 1 tph to Newton, via Pollokshields East and Mount Florida
- 1 tph to Newton, via Pollokshields West and Pollokshaws East
- 2 tph to Neilston, via Mount Florida and Cathcart
- 1tph to Glasgow Central, via Mount Florida, Cathcart and Pollokshaws East
- 1tph to Glasgow Central, via Pollokshaws East, Cathcart and Mount Florida
- 1 tph to Edinburgh Waverley (fast), via Bellshill and Shotts
- 1tph to Edinburgh Waverly (slow), via Bellshill, Cleland and Shotts
- 1 tp2h to Edinburgh Waverley, via Motherwell and Carstairs
- 2 tph to Paisley Canal, via Mosspark
- 2 tph to Gourock, via Paisley Gilmour Street and Port Glasgow
- 2 tph to Wemyss Bay, via Paisley Gilmour Street, Paisley St James and Port Glasgow
- 2 tph to Ayr, via Kilwinning and Prestwick International Airport
- 1 tph to Ardrossan Harbour, via Paisley Gilmour Street and Ardrossan Town
- 1 tph to Largs, via Paisley Gilmour Street and West Kilbride
- 2 tph to East Kilbride, via Pollokshaws West and Busby (of which 1tph calls at Thorntonhall)
- 1 tph to Barrhead, via Pollokshaws West
- 1 tph to Kilmarnock (fast), via Barrhead (of which 1tp2h continues to Carlisle, 1 tpd continues to Ayr and 1tpd continues to Girvan)
- 1 tph to Kilmarnock (slow), via Pollokshaws West and Barrhead

Low Level:

- 2 tph to Larkhall, via Newton and Hamilton Central
- 2 tph to Motherwell, via Newton and Hamilton Central (of which 1tph continues to Cumbernauld via Coatbridge Central)
- 2 tph to Whifflet, via Mount Vernon (of which, 1tph continues to Motherwell)
- 2 tph to Dalmuir, via Anniesland and Singer
- 4 tph to Dalmuir, via Yoker and Clydebank.

=== Avanti West Coast ===
- 1 tph to London Euston (fast), via Preston and Warrington Bank Quay (trains alternate between calls at Penrith and Oxenholme Lake District at 1 tp2h each)
- 1 tp2h to London Euston, via Preston, Warrington Bank Quay, Crewe, Birmingham New Street and Coventry
- 1 tpd to Crewe.

=== CrossCountry ===
- 2 tpd to Plymouth, via Edinburgh Waverley, York, Birmingham New Street and Bristol Temple Meads
- 1 tpd to Edinburgh Waverley (Sundays only).

=== TransPennine Express ===
- 1tp2h to Manchester Airport, via Preston and Manchester Piccadilly
- 3 tpd to Liverpool Lime Street, via Preston and St Helens Central
- 1 tpd to Preston, via Carlisle.

=== Caledonian Sleeper ===
- 1 tpd to London Euston, via Preston (except Saturday night).

Preceding station	National Rail	Following station
Motherwell	Avanti West Coast; West Coast Main Line	Terminus
Lockerbie	Avanti West Coast; West Coast Main Line	Terminus
Carlisle	Avanti West Coast; West Coast Main Line	Terminus
Motherwell	TransPennine Express (North West)	Terminus
Lockerbie	TransPennine Express (North West)	Terminus
Carlisle	TransPennine Express (North West)	Terminus
Lockerbie	TransPennine Express; Liverpool Lime Street to Glasgow Central	Terminus
Carlisle	TransPennine Express; Liverpool Lime Street to Glasgow Central	Terminus
Motherwell	CrossCountry; Scotland & The North East to the South West & South Coast	Terminus
Motherwell	Caledonian Sleeper; Lowland Caledonian Sleeper	Terminus
Motherwell	ScotRail; North Berwick Line	Terminus
Argyle Street	ScotRail; Argyle Line	Anderston
Paisley Gilmour Street	ScotRail; Ayrshire Coast Line	Terminus
Cardonald	ScotRail; Inverclyde Line	Terminus
Pollokshields East	ScotRail; Cathcart Circle Lines	Terminus
Pollokshields West	ScotRail; Cathcart Circle Lines	Terminus
Dumbreck	ScotRail; Paisley Canal Line	Terminus
Cambuslang	ScotRail; Shotts Line	Terminus
Crossmyloof	ScotRail; Glasgow South Western Line	Terminus
	Historical railways	
Glasgow Cross; Line open; station closed	Caledonian Railway; Glasgow Central Railway	Anderston; Line open; station open
Eglinton Street; Line open; station closed	Caledonian Railway; Cathcart District Railway	Terminus
Eglinton Street; Line open; station closed	Caledonian Railway; Polloc and Govan Railway	Terminus
Eglinton Street; Line open; station closed	Caledonian and Glasgow & South Western Railways; Glasgow, Barrhead and Kilmarnock Joint Railway	Terminus
Bridge Street; Line open; station closed	Caledonian and Glasgow & South Western Railways; Glasgow and Paisley Joint Railway	Terminus

=== Other transport connections ===
A taxi rank lies to the north of the station, while buses operate from the adjacent streets.

St Enoch and Buchanan Street Subway stations are within a few minutes' walk.

First Glasgow operates a bus service on behalf of ScotRail to Glasgow Queen Street and Buchanan bus station; this bus is numbered 398 and runs every 12 minutes.

== Inside Central Station ==
Coinciding with the launch of the new BBC Scotland TV channel, a new documentary TV series titled Inside Central Station was commissioned to STV Productions, first airing on 3 March 2019 detailing the day-to-day life of the station following and interviewing various members of staff on their shifts and passengers visiting the station. The series also focused on the history of the station, with segments presented by the station tour guide, Paul Lyons. The series received positive critical reception. Currently, four series of the show have aired.
