= Cathcart District Railway =

Railway in Glasgow, Scotland

The Cathcart District Railway was proposed to serve the arising demand for suburban residential travel on the south side of Glasgow, Scotland. It was planned as a loop running to and from Glasgow Central station, but at first only the eastern arm, to Cathcart via Queens Park, was built, opening in 1886. The western arm was opened in 1894 and trains operated round the loop. A frequent passenger train service was operated, and there was also a limited goods and mineral operation.

The passenger trains were popular but the company was never very profitable, and tramcar competition hit it hard. A decline set in through the twentieth century until electrification in 1962, which revived the line, which served onward routes to Newton and Neilston as well.

The line continues in use today.

== History ==
=== Before suburban railways ===
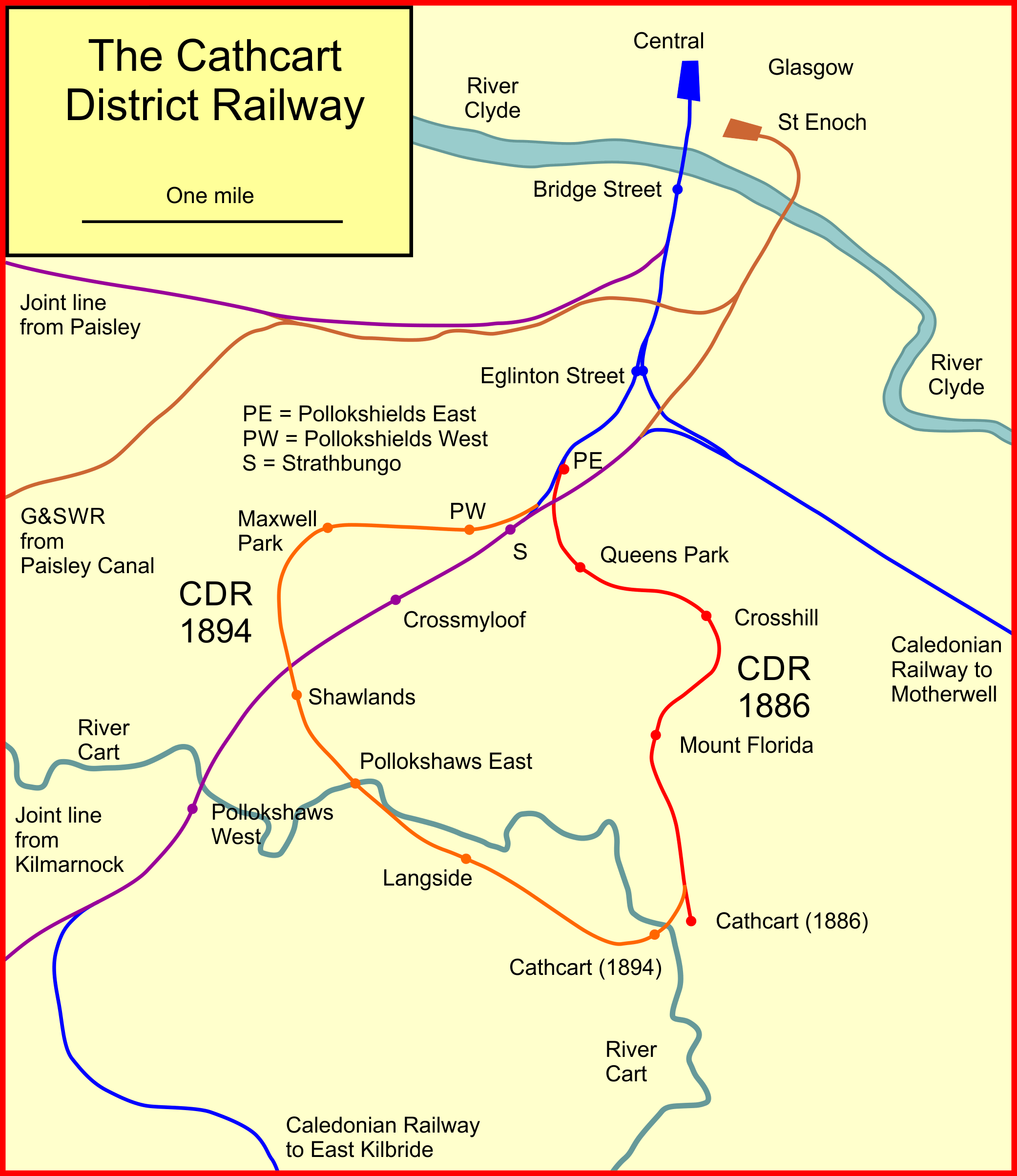
The Cathcart District Railway system

The trunk railways of central Scotland developed from 1850 onwards; the Caledonian Railway and the Glasgow and South Western Railway (G&SWR) were trunk railways formed with the intention of linking to the English railway network. Other railways south of the River Clyde led to specific locations outside Glasgow. As the city grew, the notion of daily residential passenger travel arose, at first by the middle classes but increasingly by all levels of the community. Suburban railway facilities were limited, and they were inhibited by the inconvenient location of the Glasgow passenger terminals. Bridge Street station was on the south side of the river close to Glasgow Bridge. It served the Paisley lines. South Side station was located further from the city, south of Cumberland Street; it served the Barrhead, Hamilton and Motherwell lines. Buchanan Street station, located on the north-east side of the city at Cowcaddens Street led by a circuitous railway route to the Motherwell and Carlisle line, as well as the Stirling direction.

This unsatisfactory situation was resolved by the construction of two central passenger terminal stations: St Enoch station, opened by the G&SWR in 1876, connecting to the G&SWR line to Ayr via the Paisley joint line, and to Kilmarnock over the Glasgow, Barrhead and Kilmarnock Joint Railway, opened in 1873. This "magnificent terminal" was centrally situated in the city, and it gave access to all the G&SWR south side lines. In 1879 the Caledonian opened its Glasgow Central station, also well situated, and accessible for all the Caledonian's south side routes.

=== Cathcart lines proposed ===
So from 1 August 1879 both large railway companies had commodious new stations serving their south side network. On 15 November 1879 three suburban railways to the Cathcart area were announced in the press; they were all independent, and all assumed a connection to the new terminal stations; they sought running powers for the purpose. They all planned to leave the Barrhead line at Strathbungo, turning south-east. Two proposed a loop, returning to near the starting point; the third was a simple branch line.

Cathcart District Railway Act 1880
- Act of Parliament
- Parliament of the United Kingdom
- Long title: An Act to authorise the construction of Railways in and near to the District of Cathcart, on the south side of Glasgow; and for other purposes.
- Citation: 43 & 44 Vict. c. ccix

Dates
- Royal assent: 7 September 1880

Text of statute as originally enacted

In fact the G&SWR rebuffed the approach of one of the contenders, and this was made known to the others, who reconsidered the St Enoch part of their schemes. The most ambitious proposal was the Cathcart District Railway (CDR) and this was favoured by the Caledonian, which offered (in March 1880) to work the line at cost if it were connected only to their lines. As the Glasgow Barrhead and Kilmarnock Joint Railway, managed independently, was objecting to the running powers application over their line. Accordingly, the CDR withdrew the proposal for those running powers, and their parliamentary bill was unopposed as a result. On 7 September 1880, the Cathcart District Railway Act 1880 (43 & 44 Vict. c. ccix) was passed. The share capital was to be £175,000. The route was substantially the present-day Cathcart Circle, leaving the connecting line between Central station and the GB&KJR line at a proposed Cathcart Junction, near Albert Road (later Albert Drive), running in a loop via Cathcart and returning to a junction near Strathbungo station.

=== Raising capital and constructing the line ===
Prior to this the Caledonian Railway had intended to apply for powers to subscribe for shares in the CDR and to work it, but a difference of opinion about the connection to the G&SWR lines resulted in the Caledonian withdrawing for the time being. In the 1881 session, however the Caledonian relented and the Caledonian Railway (Additional Powers) Act 1881 (44 & 45 Vict. c. cxix) empowered it to subscribe 50% of the share issue, and to manage and work the line. Only now, on 7 December 1881, did the company issue a prospectus inviting public subscription. The Caledonian would work and maintain the line for 45% of gross receipts.

Share subscription proceeded satisfactorily, but on 22 November 1882 the company asked the Caledonian to agree to a proposal to construct only the eastern arm of the circle, "due to a lack of support in the district". This meant building only the section from Cathcart Junction via Queens Park and Mount Florida to Cathcart. The Caledonian agreed to this. (Note: From Kernahan, page 16; it seems a remarkably casual way to cancel half the "circle" route. Only the village of Pollokshaws lay on the proposed route. See also the offer from the Pollok Estate later.)

Tenders for construction were quickly obtained, and Alex Coghill & Co were awarded the contract in the sum of £76,571 on 10 January 1883; Coghill had no railway construction experience and his tender was substantially cheaper than the others. In fact Coghill was unable to progress the work properly, and left certain buildings alongside railway cutting earthworks in a dangerous situation. A major disagreement over payments arose and on 14 November 1883 Coghill discontinued work on the line.

Amid demands for compensation from Coghill, the company relet the contract to Morrison and Mason in the sum of £76,407. The company had lost a considerable sum in employing Coghill, and his own company went into liquidation.

In April 1885 the Pollok Estates asked if the company would wish to extend the line to the west of Cathcart, if offered the land at agricultural values. This appears to reinstate the originally intended circle route, and was provisionally accepted by the CDR.

Major General Hutchinson inspected the line on 11 February 1886 and approved it for opening as far as Mount Florida subject to some minor detail work. A special train for civic dignitaries ran on 27 February and the public opening was on Monday 1 March 1886, worked by the Caledonian. one and a quarter miles (2.0 km) of railway had been constructed. It was double as far as Crosshill, and single to Mount Florida.

=== First operations and extensions ===
The line proved remarkably popular; thirty-two trains ran each way six days a week.

On 20 May Major General Hutchinson inspected the extension to Cathcart; the whole line was now all double track. Trains started running on 25 May 1886, in the face of reservations from the Caledonian about the passenger facilities at Cathcart station. (The CDR already expected to extend the line and the station was therefore only temporary.) The stations on the line were

- Pollokshields East
- Queens Park
- Crosshill
- Mount Florida
- Cathcart.

Goods and mineral traffic started in August 1887 to Mount Florida and Cathcart; there were no facilities at the other stations.

In January 1887 new sets of coaches were provided for the line, consisting of nine four-wheel coaches with gas lighting and steam heating. Football traffic from Hampden Park and also from the Third Lanark ground was a significant traffic from the outset.

=== Completing the circle ===
Cathcart District Railway Act 1887
- Act of Parliament
- Parliament of the United Kingdom
- Long title: An Act to authorise the Cathcart District Railway Company to construct a railway from their authorised railway at New Cathcart to join the Caledonian Railway at Strathbungo to revive the powers and extend the time for the compulsory purchase of lands for and to extend the time for the completion of their authorised railway No. 1 to abandon their authorised railway No. 3 to raise further capital and for other purposes.
- Citation: 50 & 51 Vict. c. cxxix

Dates
- Royal assent: 19 July 1887

Cathcart District Railway Act 1889
- Act of Parliament
- Parliament of the United Kingdom
- Long title: An Act to empower the Caledonian Railway Company to subscribe towards and to confer on that Company certain other powers with respect to the undertaking of the Cathcart District Railway Company and for other purposes.
- Citation: 52 & 53 Vict. c. iv

Dates
- Royal assent: 31 May 1889

Text of statute as originally enacted

Cathcart District Railway Act 1890
- Act of Parliament
- Parliament of the United Kingdom
- Long title: An Act to enable the Cathcart District Railway Company to raise further money and to create and issue debenture stock and the Caledonian Railway Company to subscribe or to take and hold such stock or to advance to the Company by way of loan and for other purposes.
- Citation: 53 & 54 Vict. c. xix

Dates
- Royal assent: 22 May 1890

In early 1887 it was decided to complete the circle as originally planned; Caledonian approval was obtained for this and a bill presented in the 1887 parliamentary session. (Note: The original powers must have been cancelled. The connection at Strathbungo, actually at Muirhouse South Junction, was to the Caledonian line (originally the General Terminus route) and did not touch the GB&KJR line.) The G&SWR opposed the bill, but royal assent was obtained for the Cathcart District Railway Act 1887 (50 & 51 Vict. c. cxxix) on 19 July 1887, capital £145,000. The route did not involve the difficult earthworks of the eastern section of the loop and was to be cheaper to build; cheap land was to be gifted by the Pollok Estate. Although the first section was heavily used, shareholder dividends had been considerably lower than promised and it proved difficult to generate subscriptions; after a time the Caledonian agreed to make the necessary subscription to let the line proceed. In fact the Caledonian exercised gradually increasing minority control of the CDR. The Cathcart District Railway Act 1889 (52 & 53 Vict. c. iv) had empowered it to invest £100,000 in the CDR and to guarantee the interest on the CDR's debenture stock.

Cathcart District Railway (Extension of Time) Act 1892
- Act of Parliament
- Parliament of the United Kingdom
- Long title: An Act to extend the time for the completion of the Railway authorised by the Cathcart District Railway Act 1887.
- Citation: 55 & 56 Vict. c. xi

Dates
- Royal assent: 20 May 1892

Text of statute as originally enacted

Cathcart District Railway (Superfluous Lands) Order Confirmation Act 1906
- Act of Parliament
- Parliament of the United Kingdom
- Long title: An Act to confirm a Provisional Order under the Private Legislation Procedure (Scotland) Act 1899 relating to the Cathcart District Railway.
- Citation: 6 Edw. 7. c. xxi

Dates
- Royal assent: 29 May 1906

Other legislation
- Relates to: Private Legislation Procedure (Scotland) Act 1899

Text of statute as originally enacted

On 9 October 1890 a contract was awarded for the construction of the line, at £81,095; this was over three years from royal assent for the work. The work did not progress rapidly and an act of Parliament, the Cathcart District Railway (Extension of Time) Act 1892 (55 & 56 Vict. c. xi) was required to extend the permitted time for completion; the line opened on 2 April 1894. There was a new Cathcart through station (actually opened on 19 March 1894); the earlier Cathcart became a goods station. The stations on the new section were:

- Cathcart
- Langside
- Pollokshaws East; a goods depot was provided here;
- Shawlands
- Maxwell Park; a goods depot was provided south of the station;
- Pollokshields West.

Pollokshaws East station had the specifier "East" from the outset. There was already a Pollokshaws station on the joint line, which became Pollokshaws West. (Note: Quick says the CDR station was simply Pollokshaws until 1952, but this is not supported by the 1922 and 1938 Bradshaw which use Pollokshaws East.)

Passengers were allowed to travel to and from Glasgow by either arm of the circle; attention was drawn to the anomaly that someone could travel the long way round passing a station where a higher fare to or from Glasgow applied.

A special train was run on 31 March 1894 for the press and directors, and the line opened for ordinary traffic on 2 April.

Although the line was in heavy use the company was not profitable, and small dividends, or none at all, were the norm. In fact after the first full year of operation of the full circle the line had earnt less than the former half circle in its final year. The anticipated residential development took some time to be started, and street running tramways with cheap fares had developed progressively from 1875. The CDR reduced fares in 1895.

=== The Lanarkshire and Ayrshire Railway ===
The Caledonian Railway carried a heavy mineral traffic from coalfields in South Lanarkshire to Ardrossan Harbour for export. This traffic ran via Langside Junction in south Glasgow, and the heavy and slow trains caused congestion; their onward route was over the Glasgow, Barrhead and Kilmarnock Joint Railway, so that some of the income from the traffic passed to the rival G&SWR.

The Caledonian would see a considerable advantage if a direct railway could by-pass these areas, and the nominally independent Lanarkshire and Ayrshire Railway was proposed. In 1888 it opened at the Ardrossan end, and was extended through Neilston to Cathcart, opening for goods on 1 April 1903, and for passengers on 1 May 1903. The final section from Cathcart to Newton, on the Hamilton and Motherwell main line, was opened on 6 January 1904.

Passenger trains were run via Mount Florida to Ardrossan and Newton: a 45-minute timing from Glasgow to Ardrossan was allowed for boat trains, but the dominant traffic on the line was mineral trains.

The junction at Cathcart was triangular, with the Newton to Mount Florida route being a burrowing junction under the existing Circle line. No passenger service was contemplated on the Neilston to Newton and the Cathcart station was not accessible on that route; it was not possible to run from Langside to either route.

=== The twentieth century ===
By the beginning of the twentieth century the residential development hoped for was at last proceeding. Trains on the circle were running at ten-minute intervals, the highest frequency outside London, and despite the electrification of the street tramways, business was booming. There was pressure for more trains, but the limitation was the limited accommodation at Glasgow Central. Fares were lowered and for a time revenues suffered, recovering somewhat from 1907. Incidentally there were no trains on Sunday on the lines (until 1962).

At this period, in fact from 1899, electrification of the line was considered. At this early date there was little experience of railway operation by electricity, and it was decided to wait and observe the results of experimentation on railways elsewhere. In 1908 it was definitely decided not to proceed with electrification.

The Railways Act 1921 brought about the grouping of the railways of Great Britain. The Caledonian Railway and the Cathcart District Railway were to be incorporated in the new London Midland and Scottish Railway (LMS) and this took effect from 1 January 1923. (Administrative measures delayed the formal process for several months after the effective date.) The CDR was still receiving 55% of receipts prior to this time. Ordinary shareholders received £51 of ordinary LMS stock with a market value of £57 for every £100 face value of CDR stock. As part of the process the CDR received war compensation of £21,019 from the Government.

Tramway competition intensified considerably: Glasgow's tram fares were the cheapest in Britain, and the passenger service declined to a 30-minute interval, but carryings improved and a fifteen-minute service was resumed in the years immediately before 1939. However, during World War II the frequency was drastically reduced and an interval service was discontinued.

Nationalisation took place in 1948, and on 21 September 1953 a regular hourly service was introduced on the line. Diesel multiple units were introduced from 1958.

Electrification had been discussed over many decades but in the late 1950s it became a definite intention. The Cathcart circle was to be resignalled and electrified. The lines to Newton via Kirkhill, and to Neilston, were considered to be integral with the Cathcart circle lines, though steam trains to Ardrossan would continue, running non-stop to Neilston. On 6 March 1961 a new connection was provided at Cathcart enabling trains to run from the Maxwell Park line towards Kirkhill.

On 10 December 1961 electric power was switched on, and after trials a public passenger service started on 27 May 1962; Sunday trains ran for the first time. Three car units ran, strengthened to six at peak times; proposals to run nine-coach trains at the busiest times were considered impracticable because of the difficulty of extending the stations' island platforms. The electrification was at 25 kV 50 Hz, but limited overhead clearances required 6.25 kV to be used in the inner area. An electrical control room was provided at Cathcart.

The suburban electric trains were equipped with apparatus to switch between line voltages, but when the main line electrification from Crewe to Glasgow was implemented, the Maxwell Park section of the Cathcart circle was designated as a diversionary route. The main line locomotives were not fitted with voltage switching mechanisms, and as the air clearance requirement had been relaxed in the intervening years, the 6.25 kV section was converted to 25 kV from September 1973.

== Topography ==
=== The route ===
The line diverges from the line between Glasgow Central and the Barrhead at Muirhouse North Junction (Note: Originally named Cathcart Junction; the controlling signalbox was renamed Pollokshields East Junction from 1 July 1903.) Pollokshields East station is immediately after the junction, and the line turns east passing under the line from Larkfield Junction. Running between retaining walls the line reaches Queens Park station and then Crosshill, turning sharply south still below natural ground level to Mount Florida. Now on an elevated section the line runs to Cathcart North Junction, where the grade-separated divergence to Kings Park leaves. The line now curves sharply west to Cathcart station and Cathcart West Junction where the alternate route from Kings Park converges, and the Neilston line diverges. The line turns north west still on an elevated section and runs through Langside and Pollokshaws East. There is a short climb of 1 in 68 followed by a sharp descent to Shawlands, after which the line crosses the Glasgow to Barrhead line and curves north and then east to Maxwell Park station. The line then enters a cutting to meet Pollokshields West station, rejoining the Barrhead line at Muirhouse Central Junction.

The line is 5 miles 19 chains (8.43 km) long.

The line falls briefly from Muirhouse North Junction, but climbs at a ruling gradient of 1 in 70 to Mount Florida. The climb moderates but continues to a summit at Cathcart West Junction, and then falls moderately, and then briefly at 1 in 100, to Pollokshaws East. A short climb at 1 in 65 follows, then a longer descent at a ruling gradient of 1 in 67 to Maxwell Park; from there the line continues on very gentle gradients.

The general permitted speed on the line is 40 mph (64 km).

All the stations on the route had island platforms, "a successful innovation which reduced staff costs and gave effective control of passenger flow".

Pollokshields East was closed from 1 January 1917 to 1 March 1919 and Crosshill station was closed from 1 January 1917 to 1 June 1919 as a wartime economy. (Note: According to Kernahan and Butt; Quick says Pollokshields East and Crosshill reopened on 1 April 1919.) Mount Florida station was relocated to the south in May 1982.

All the original passenger stations (except the first Cathcart, relocated later) are still in use.

== See also ==
- Cathcart Circle Lines
