= Muirend railway station =

Railway station in Glasgow City, Scotland

Muirend Scottish Gaelic: Ceann an t-Slèibh
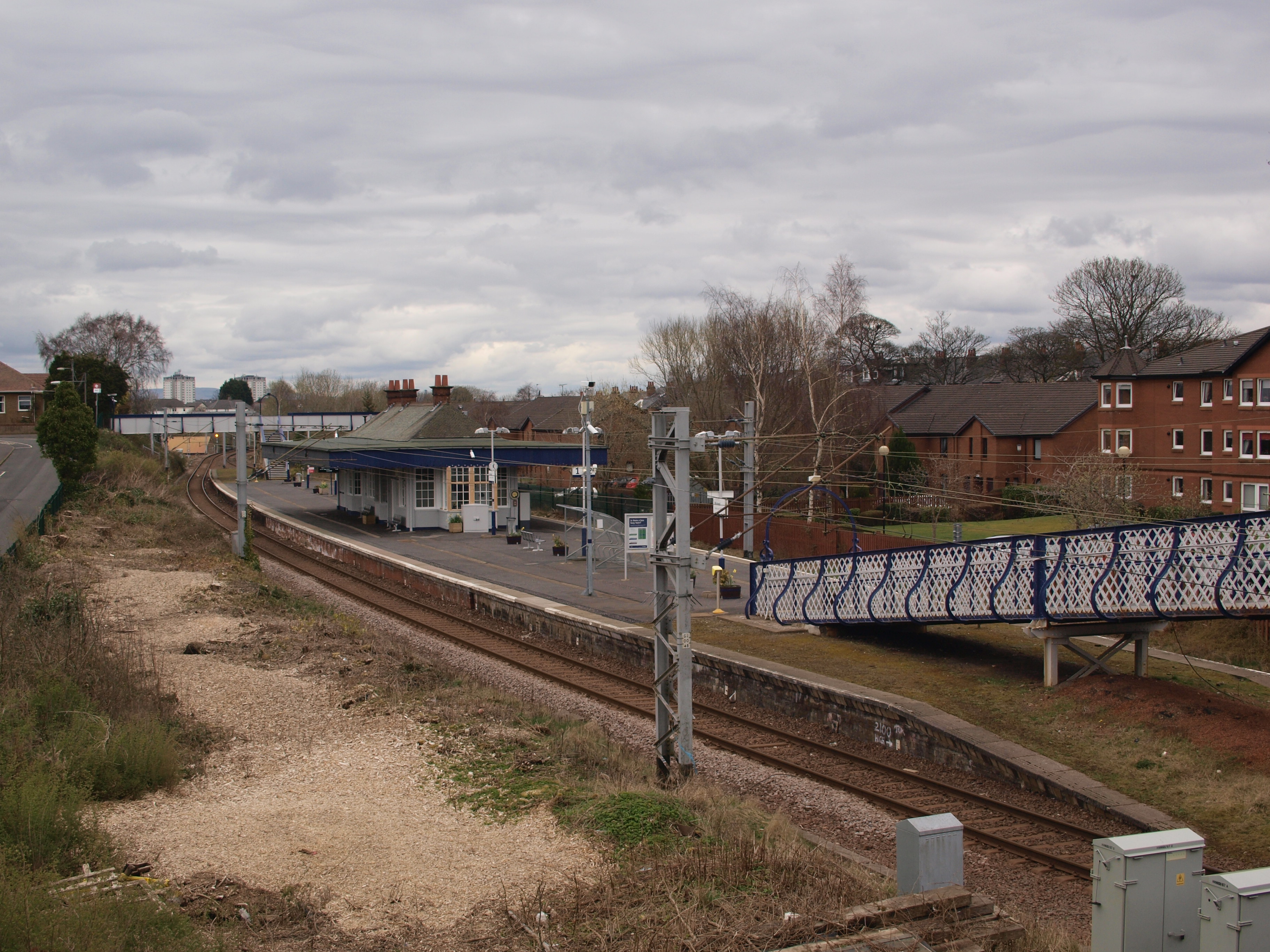
- Muirend station in 2020

General information
- Location: Muirend, Glasgow; Scotland
- Coordinates: 55.8101°N 4.2739°W
- Grid reference: NS575597
- Manager: ScotRail
- Transit authority: SPT
- Platforms: 2

Other information
- Station code: MUI
- Classification: DfT category E

History
- Original company: Lanarkshire and Ayrshire Railway
- Pre-grouping: Caledonian Railway
- Post-grouping: LMS

Key dates
- 1 May 1903: Opened

Passengers
- 2021/22: ▲0.178 million
- 2022/23: ▲0.244 million
- 2023/24: ▲0.304 million
- 2024/25: ▲0.337 million
- 2025/26: ▼0.334 million
Location
Notes
- Passenger statistics from the Office of Rail and Road

Muirend railway station is an island platform suburban railway station in the Muirend area of Glasgow, Scotland. The station, which opened in 1903, is managed by ScotRail and lies on the Neilston branch of the Cathcart Circle Lines.

== History ==
The station was opened by the Lanarkshire and Ayrshire Railway on 1 May 1903, as part of an extension from that company's previous northern terminus at Giffen to a junction with the Cathcart District Railway at Cathcart. The route was completed through to Newton (on what is now the West Coast Main Line) the following year, giving the L&AR a route between Lanarkshire and the coast at Ardrossan independent of the Glasgow and South Western Railway. Though the line carried freight and express boat trains from Adrossan to Glasgow Central, Muirend was only ever served by local suburban workings. A connection was laid in south of the station down to the Busby Railway at Clarkston around the same time as the L&AR main line was opened, but it was never used for through traffic (only for wagon storage) and was disconnected by 1907 (though the brick viaduct it used still stands to this day), and only the crossover underneath the road bridge immediately south of the station remains of the kilometre long branch. Through passenger traffic over this route declined significantly after the 1923 Grouping and regular passenger trains were withdrawn beyond Uplawmoor in 1932.

Services through here were converted to diesel operation from 1958 and the Cathcart lines were subsequently electrified in 1962 (though the wires only ran as far as Neilston, the line beyond closing to passengers in April 1962 and completely in December 1964). Through trains to Kirkhill and Newton also ended at this time, with passengers henceforth having to change at Mount Florida. With popular demand, these services were reinstated in the 1980s. With electrification came the Class 303 'Blue Train' EMUs, which operated the Cathcart Circle and its branches until their withdrawal in the early 2000s. Class 314 EMUs cascaded from the Inverclyde routes by the introduction of the Class 334 Juniper EMUs took over workings, and were only replaced on the route a couple of months before their final withdrawal in December 2019.

British Rail and SPTE proposals published in the early 1980s would have seen the Clarkston spur reopened and used by re-routed trains to/from East Kilbride, which would have then run to Glasgow Central via Cathcart and Queens Park. The scheme would also have seen the East Kilbride branch electrified, but the Clarkston to Busby Junction section closed (along with Patterton and Neilston stations, with the line cut back to Whitecraigs). The proposals were not well received and were never implemented.

== Services and facilities ==
Services are now operated mainly by four-car Class 380/1 EMUs, with the three-coach Class 318 EMUs and Class 320 EMUs working together to provide six coach services at peak times. Two trains an hour operate in each direction, calling all stops from Glasgow Central to Neilston. Additional peak time services operate between Central and Neilston, calling only from Muirend through to the terminus. Sunday services are also half-hourly, but start around three hours later than on other days.

The station has an island platform with a ramp providing access directly to the platform from Muirend Road at the south end of the station. At the north end, there is a footbridge access to and from Hillcrest Avenue and Cairndow Court. The station building (which is Category B listed) contains a ticket office, staffed on a part-time basis. An automated ticket machine is present.

Preceding station	National Rail	Following station
Williamwood	ScotRail; Cathcart Circle Lines	Cathcart
	Historical railways	
Whitecraigs; Line and station open	Caledonian Railway; Lanarkshire and Ayrshire Railway	Kirkhill; Line and station open
