= Cathcart railway station =

Railway station in Glasgow, Scotland

Cathcart
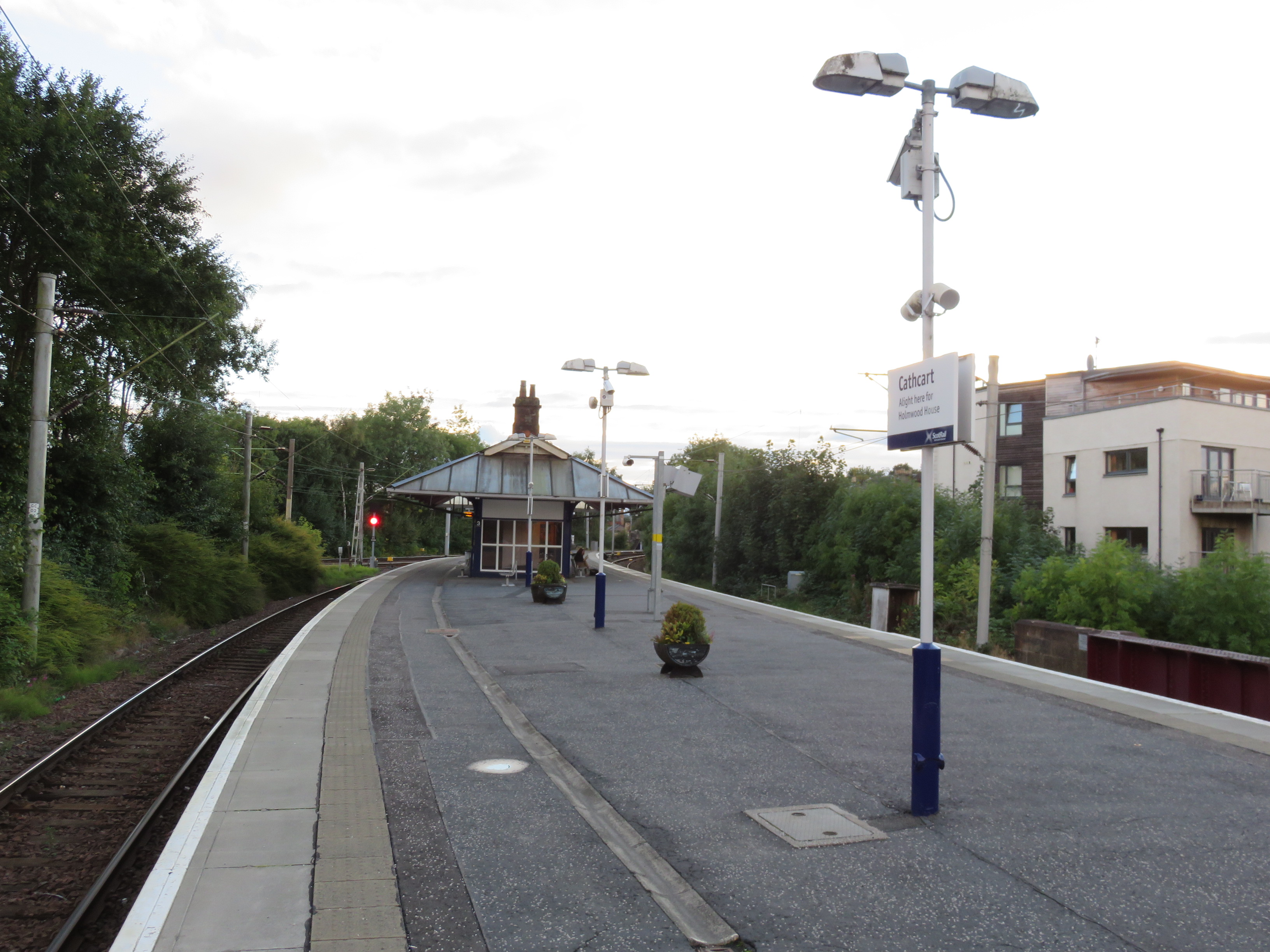

General information
- Location: Cathcart, Glasgow; Scotland
- Coordinates: 55.81764°N 4.26056°W
- Grid reference: NS584605
- Manager: ScotRail
- Transit authority: SPT
- Platforms: 2

Other information
- Station code: CCT
- Fare zone: 1

History
- Original company: Cathcart District Railway
- Pre-grouping: Caledonian Railway
- Post-grouping: LMS

Key dates
- 25 May 1886: Original terminus station opened to the north of the White Cart River
- 18 March 1894: Original terminus closed
- 19 March 1894: New through station opened to the south of the White Cart River

Passengers
- 2021/22: ▲0.288 million
- Interchange: ▲609
- 2022/23: ▲0.369 million
- Interchange: ▲643
- 2023/24: ▲0.481 million
- Interchange: ▲1,118
- 2024/25: ▲0.545 million
- Interchange: ▲1,600
- 2025/26: ▲0.561 million
- Interchange: ▼1,537
Location
Notes
- Passenger statistics from the Office of Rail and Road

Cathcart railway station is a railway station serving the Cathcart area of Glasgow, Scotland. It is located on the Cathcart Circle Line, 3.7 miles (6 km) south of Glasgow Central (via Queens Park). Services are provided by ScotRail previously on behalf of Strathclyde Passenger Transport.

== History ==
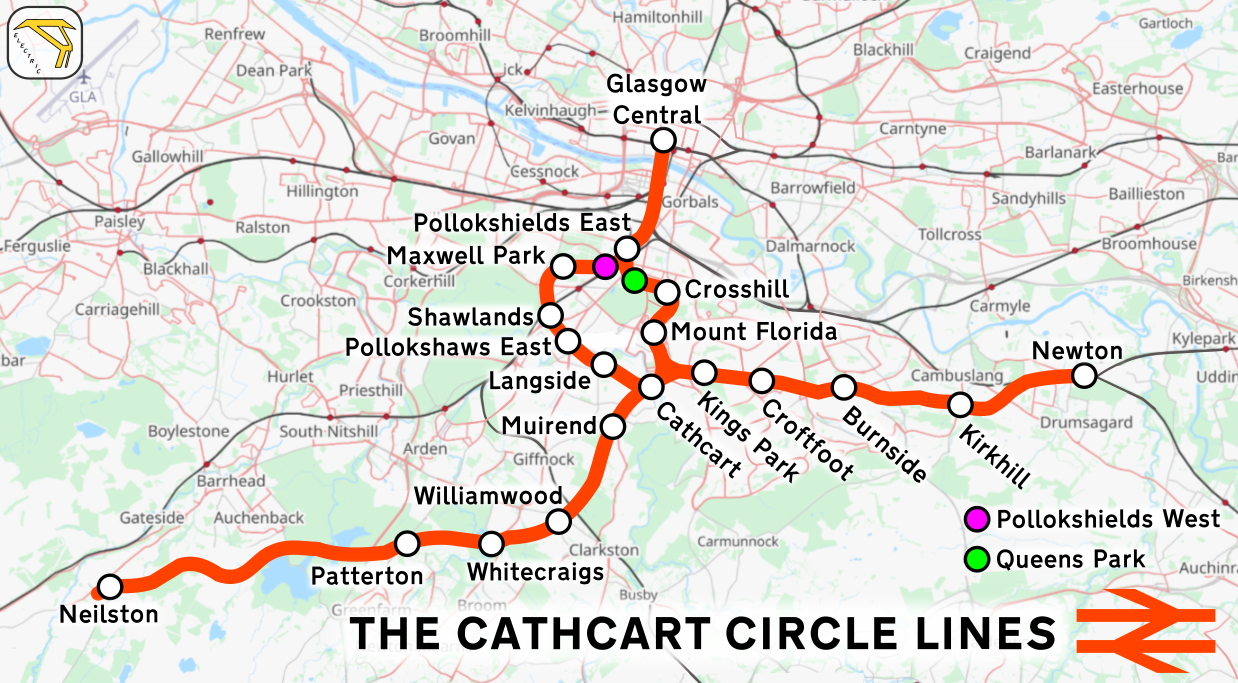
Cathcart Circle Lines route map

The station here was opened on 19 March 1894, shortly before the commissioning of the western side of the Cathcart Circle Lines on 2 April that year. It replaced an earlier temporary station opened in 1886, which served as the terminus of the line from Glasgow via Queens Park. The Caledonian Railway-backed Lanarkshire and Ayrshire Railway extension from Giffen to Newton was subsequently opened in 1904, which passed a short distance to the south of the station but was linked to it by a spur, which allowed through running from the Neilston direction towards Glasgow Central (and vice versa). The station could then be served by local trains between Neilston & Uplawmoor and Glasgow Central as well as those in both directions around the Circle.

Train services were progressively dieselised from 1958, prior to being electrified in May 1962 (using the 25 kV A.C system). As part of the electrification scheme, the track layout to the south was altered so that through running from the western side of the Circle towards Newton was possible, though these trains still could not call at Cathcart station itself. Services were henceforth operated by Class 303 Electric Multiple Units, with the similar Class 311 sets also appearing. These were eventually withdrawn from service in 2002 and replaced by Class 314 units. The 314 units themselves were withdrawn from service in late 2019 and the line is served by a mix of Class 318, Class 320, Class 380 and Class 385 units.

== Facilities ==
The station is staffed on a part-time basis (the ticket office is open Mondays to Saturdays, 06:35 to 13:40 only), with a ticket machine available for purchases outside these times. There is a waiting room in the main building, along with P.A system and digital information screens for train information provision. No step-free access is provided, as the platform is reached by a staircase from the street below.

== Services ==
=== 1979 ===
Monday to Saturday two trains per hour were provided in each direction between Glasgow Central and Neilston, and in each direction on the Cathcart Circle. There was no Sunday service.

=== 2006 onwards ===
Seven days a week two trains per hour are provided in each direction between Glasgow Central and Neilston. Additionally, on Mondays to Saturdays, one train per hour is provided in each direction on the Cathcart Circle.

=== Routes ===
Preceding station	National Rail	Following station
Langside	ScotRail; Cathcart Circle	Mount Florida
Muirend	ScotRail; Cathcart Circle	Mount Florida
	Historical railways	
Langside; Line and station open	Caledonian Railway; Cathcart District Railway	Mount Florida; Line and station open
Muirend; Line and station open	Caledonian Railway; Lanarkshire and Ayrshire Railway	Link to L&AR
