= Williamwood railway station =

Railway station in East Renfrewshire, Scotland

Williamwood Scottish Gaelic: Coille Uilleim
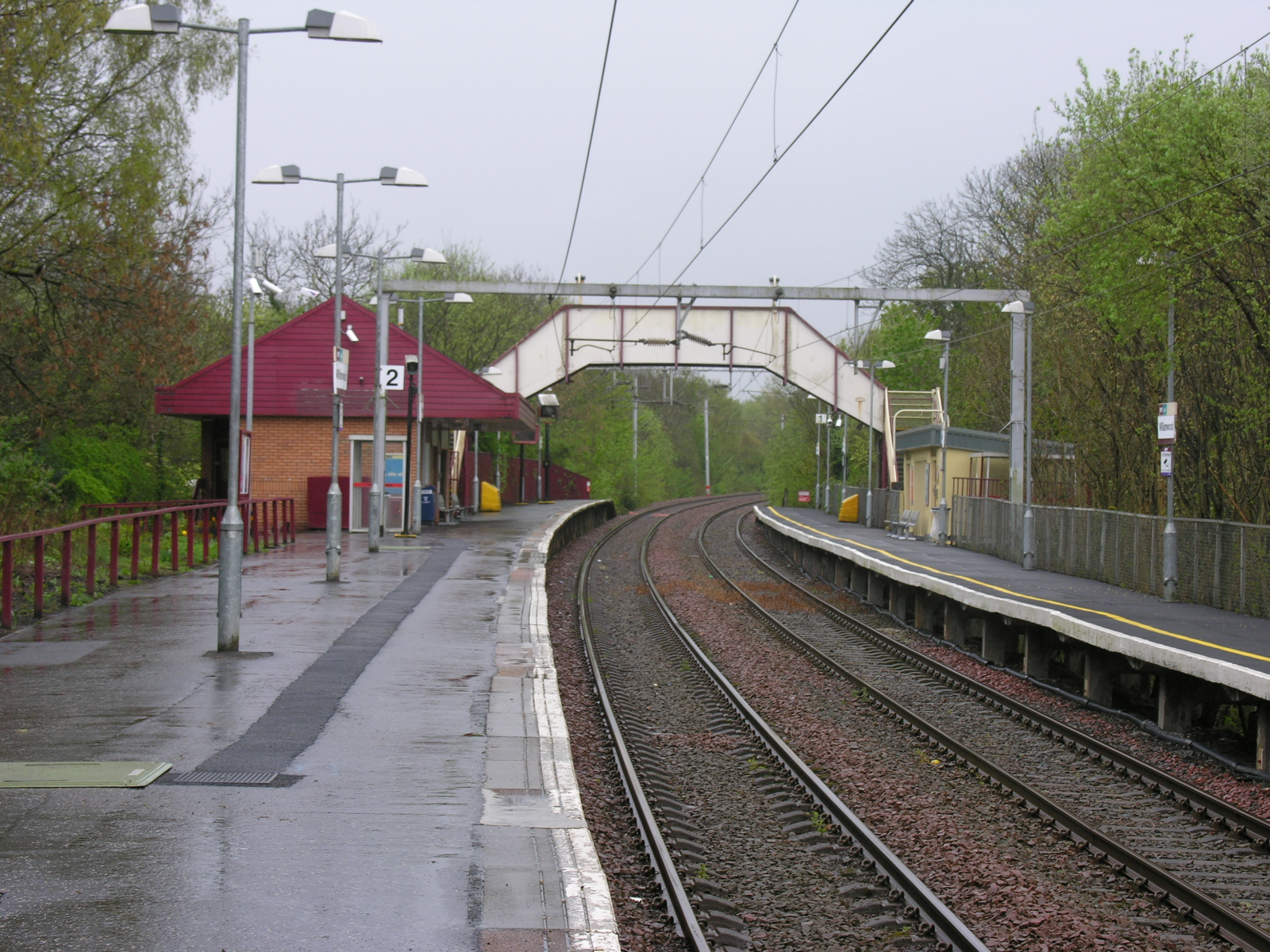
- Williamwood in 2007

General information
- Location: Clarkston, East Renfrewshire; Scotland
- Coordinates: 55.7942°N 4.2894°W
- Grid reference: NS564580
- Manager: ScotRail
- Transit authority: SPT
- Platforms: 2

Other information
- Station code: WLM
- Fare zone: G4

History
- Original company: London Midland and Scottish Railway
- Post-grouping: London Midland and Scottish Railway

Key dates
- 9 July 1929: Opened

Passengers
- 2021/22: ▲0.109 million
- 2022/23: ▲0.163 million
- 2023/24: ▲0.197 million
- 2024/25: ▲0.286 million (Note: Increased usage due to January-May closure of nearby Clarkston and Giffnock for electrification)
- 2025/26: ▼0.269 million
Location
Notes
- Passenger statistics from the Office of Rail and Road

Williamwood railway station is a railway station in the Williamwood area of the town of Clarkston, East Renfrewshire, Greater Glasgow, Scotland. The station is managed by ScotRail and lies on the Neilston branch of the Cathcart Circle Lines. The line here forms the boundary which separates Clarkston and Giffnock.

== Facilities ==
There is waiting room within the ticket office for passengers travelling towards Neilston and a waiting room and a shelter on the opposite platform for passengers travelling towards Glasgow Central. Additionally, there is a Metro newspaper dispenser. At present, there is no access for disabled people as both entrances have significant numbers of steps.

== History ==
The station was originally opened by the London, Midland and Scottish Railway on 9 July 1929 on the former Lanarkshire and Ayrshire Railway.

The station is currently fully operational, with a part-time booking office. It is an intermediate station on the Glasgow Central – Neilston line. The railway was electrified in the early 1960s and Class 303 "Blue Train" electric multiple units provided almost all trains services for many years thereafter. Until late 2019, services were primarily operated by ageing Class 314 EMUs, until a few months before their withdrawal.

As a cost-saving measure, the three stations south of Williamwood (i.e. Neilston, Patterton and Whitecraigs) were considered for possible closure in 1983 by the Strathclyde PTE but were reprieved.

== Services ==
Services are now operated mainly by 4 car Class 380/1 EMUs, with the 3 coach Class 318 EMUs and Class 320 EMUs working together to provide 6 coach services at peak times. Two trains an hour operate in each direction calling all stops from Glasgow Central to Neilston. Additionally, additional peak time services operate between Central and Neilston, calling only from Muirend through to the terminus.

Preceding station	National Rail	Following station
Whitecraigs	ScotRail; Cathcart Circle Lines	Muirend
