= Mount Florida railway station =

Railway station in Glasgow, Scotland

Mount Florida Scottish Gaelic: Cnoc Florida
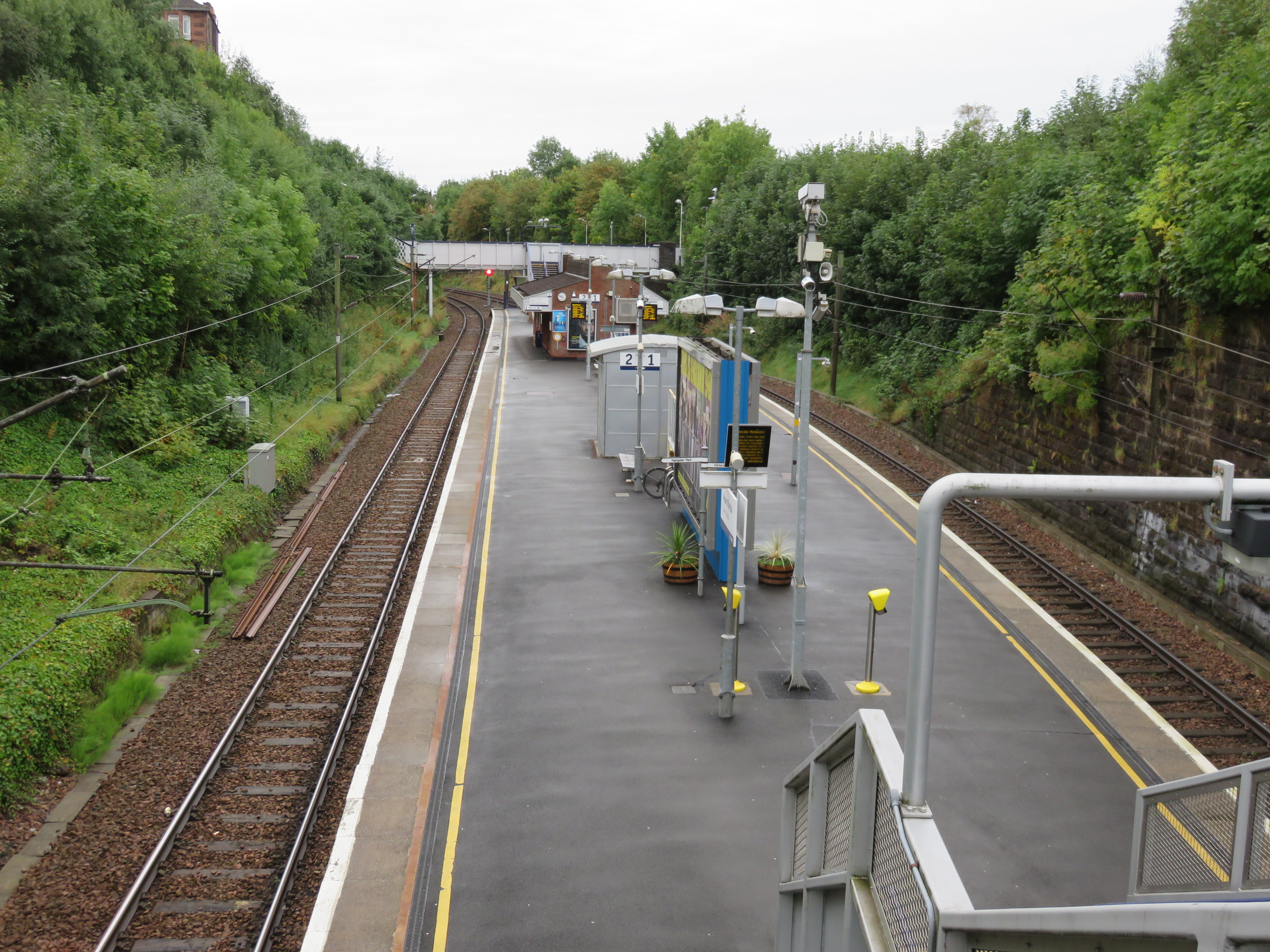
- The station seen in 2015

General information
- Location: Mount Florida, Glasgow; Scotland
- Coordinates: 55.8268°N 4.2611°W
- Grid reference: NS584615
- Manager: ScotRail
- Transit authority: SPT
- Platforms: 2

Other information
- Station code: MFL
- Fare zone: 1

History
- Original company: Cathcart District Railway
- Pre-grouping: Caledonian Railway
- Post-grouping: LMS

Key dates
- 1 March 1886: Opened

Passengers
- 2021/22: ▲0.622 million
- Interchange: ▲3,107
- 2022/23: ▲0.939 million
- Interchange: ▲3,781
- 2023/24: ▲1.030 million
- Interchange: ▲5,070
- 2024/25: ▲1.185 million
- Interchange: ▲5,394
- 2025/26: ▲1.204 million
- Interchange: ▲7,190
Location
Notes
- Passenger statistics from the Office of Rail and Road

Mount Florida railway station is a staffed island platform station on the Cathcart Circle. It serves the Mount Florida and Battlefield areas of Glasgow, Scotland and can get busy on event days at Hampden Park as it is the closest station to the stadium. Services are provided by ScotRail and previously on behalf of Strathclyde Passenger Transport.

== History ==
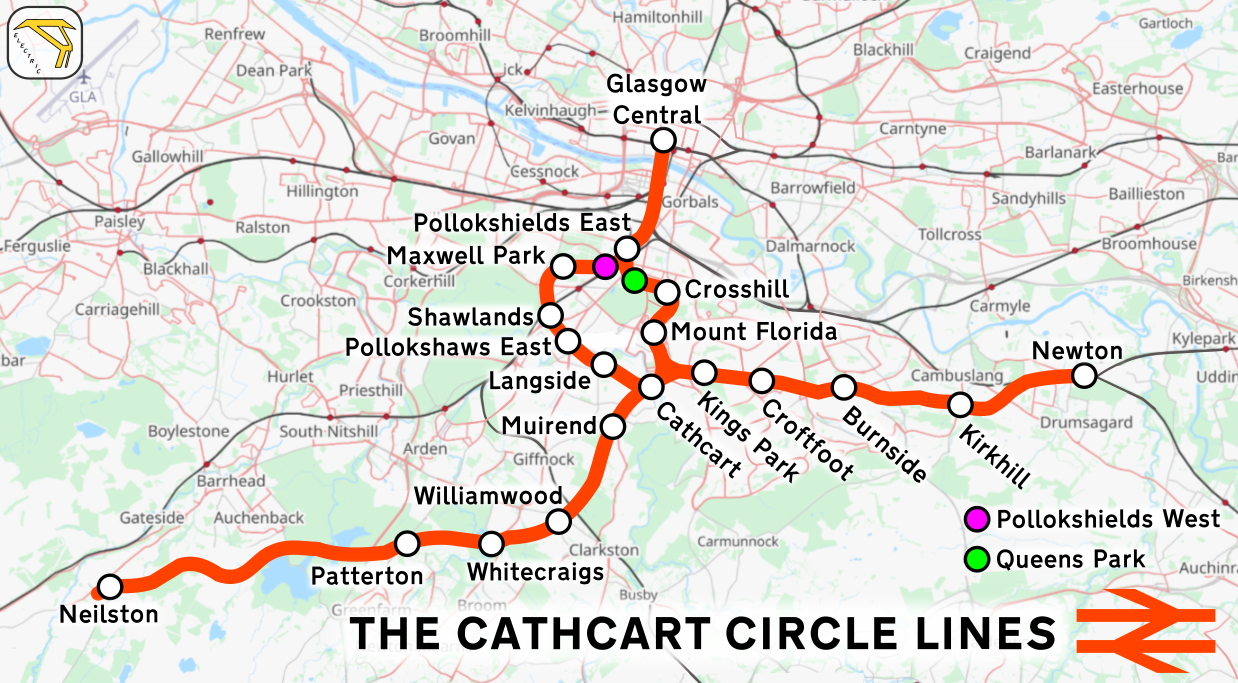
Cathcart Circle Lines route map

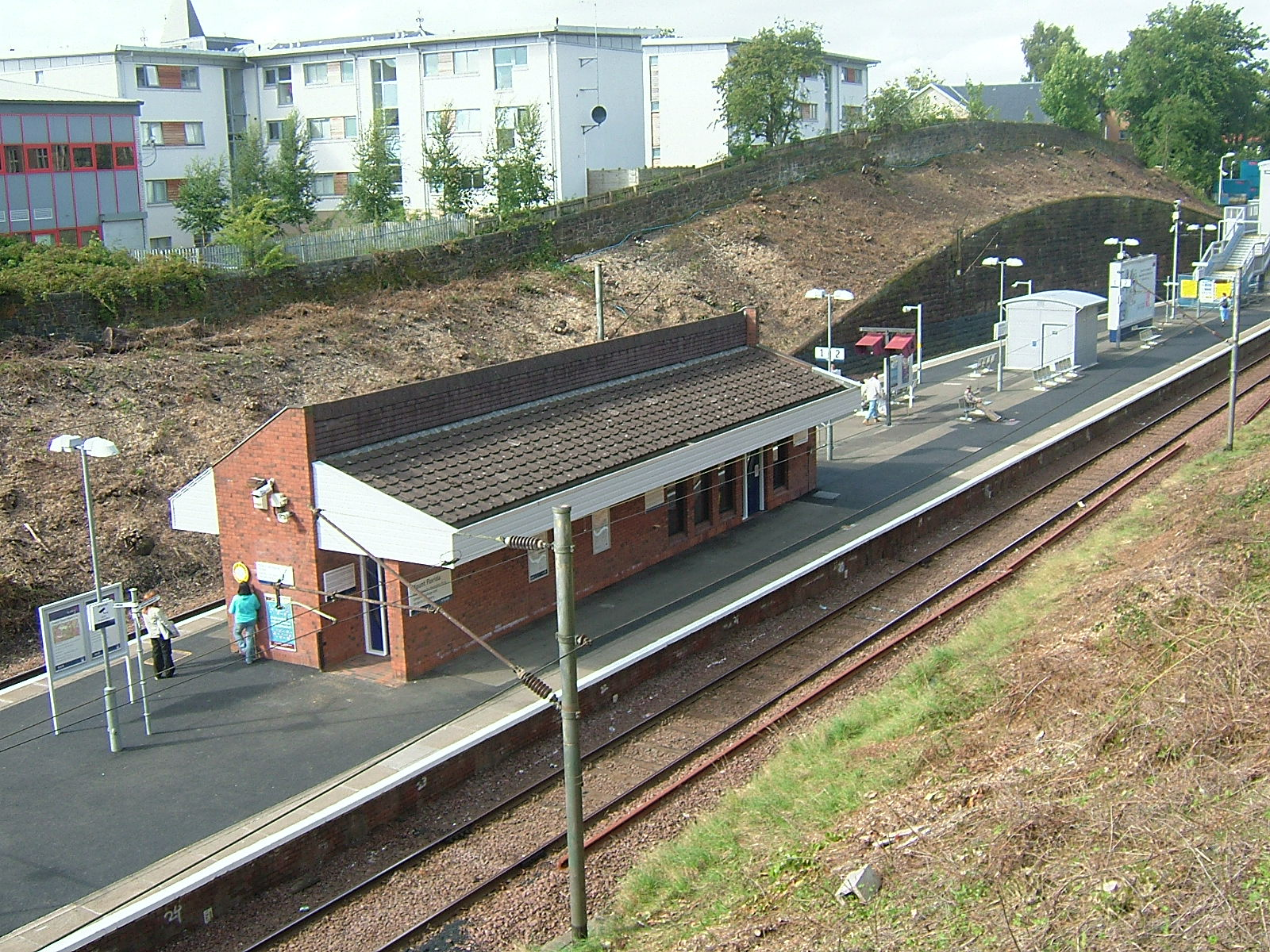
Mount Florida station in 2008

The station opened on 1 March 1886, on the Cathcart District Railway route from Glasgow to Cathcart. The station initially served as a temporary terminal for the route, as the section through to the terminus at Cathcart wasn't completed for a further two months. The western side of the Cathcart Circle Line was completed in April 1894, whilst the link to the Lanarkshire and Ayrshire Railway's extension from Neilston to Newton was added in 1904. This allowed through running from the eastern side of the Circle towards Kirkhill and thus to the Caledonian Railway main line to Motherwell at Newton. Another spur at Cathcart laid concurrently also permitted through trains from here towards Neilston and the L&AR terminus at Ardrossan (though only local trains using this route actually stopped here). Regular through trains beyond Uplawmoor on this line ended in July 1932.

Train services were electrified in May 1962, using overhead lines carrying 25 kV AC south of there and 6.25 kV to the north (due to clearance issues - the system was upgraded to 25 kV throughout in 1973). During the upgrade work, a grade separated junction was installed south of here to reduce conflicting moves between Circle line trains towards Cathcart and those heading for Kirkhill. The island platform layout here allows easy and convenient cross-platform interchange between the two branches to Neilston and Newton and Circle line trains.

Due to its proximity to Hampden Park, the station can be very busy on days where there is a football match or any other event taking place at Hampden. A third platform had been provided on the Inner Circle to the south of the main station opposite the site of the extinct goods yard. This platform was only brought into use during major events and on Wednesdays.

In January 2008, the northern exit from the station was closed whilst disabled access, including a lift, was provided. The stairs reopened in September 2008.

The station has entrances from Battlefield Road, Prospecthill Road, Bolton Drive, McLennan Street and the campus of Jon Vincent Theatre College, Glasgow.

== Services ==
=== 2016 ===
A typical weekday and Saturday service is five trains per hour to Glasgow Central (one train per hour in each direction on the Cathcart Circle, two from Neilston and one from Newton via Kirkhill), two trains per hour to Neilston and one train per hour to Newton (the one other hourly train to/from Newton runs via Langside). A Sunday service is almost the same except the Cathcart Circle trains do not operate. As a result, only three trains per hour operate to Glasgow Central.

During any major event at Hampden Park, Scotrail operate a number of additional services to Mount Florida, running non-stop from Glasgow Central.

Preceding station	National Rail	Following station
Cathcart	ScotRail; Cathcart Circle	Crosshill
King's Park	ScotRail; Glasgow-Newton	Crosshill
	Historical railways	
Cathcart	Caledonian Railway; Cathcart District Railway	Crosshill
Kirkhill	Caledonian Railway; Lanarkshire and Ayrshire Railway	Crosshill
