= Crosshill railway station =

Railway station in Glasgow, Scotland

Crosshill Scottish Gaelic: Cnoc na Croise
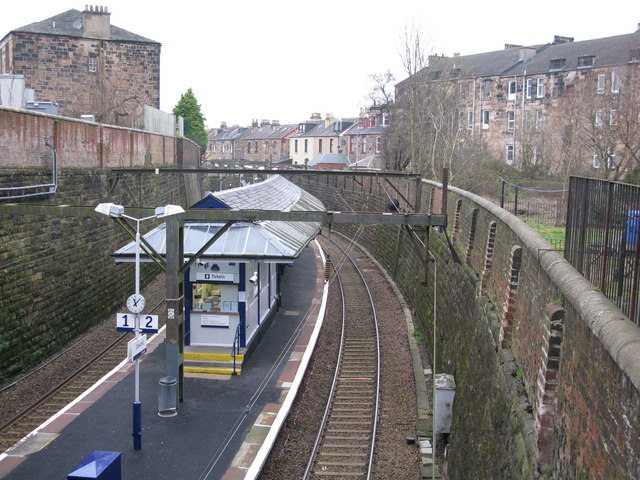

General information
- Location: Crosshill, Glasgow; Scotland
- Coordinates: 55.83325°N 4.25667°W
- Grid reference: NS587623
- Manager: ScotRail
- Transit authority: SPT
- Platforms: 2

Other information
- Station code: COI
- Fare zone: 1

History
- Original company: Cathcart District Railway
- Pre-grouping: Caledonian Railway
- Post-grouping: LMS

Key dates
- 1 March 1886: Opened
- 1 January 1917: Closed
- 1 June 1919: Reopened

Passengers
- 2021/22: ▲0.181 million
- 2022/23: ▲0.212 million
- 2023/24: ▲0.263 million
- 2024/25: ▲0.298 million
- 2025/26: ▲0.304 million
Location
Notes
- Passenger statistics from the Office of Rail and Road

Crosshill railway station is a railway station serving the Crosshill and Govanhill areas of Glasgow, Scotland. It is located on the Cathcart Circle Line but also has trains going to and from Neilston and Newton. Services are provided by ScotRail on behalf of Strathclyde Partnership for Transport.

== History ==
The station opened concurrently with the Cathcart District Railway, on 1 March 1886. It was closed as a wartime economy measure between January 1917 and June 1919. The 1923 Grouping saw ownership pass to the London, Midland and Scottish Railway and then onto the Scottish Region of British Railways in January 1948. Many trains over the route began to be worked by diesel multiple units from the summer of 1958, with overhead electrification following in 1962. A line voltage of 6.25 kV AC was used due initially to clearance issues with the bridges and cuttings along the route, though this was subsequently increased to the standard 25 kV in the early 1970s.

== Services ==
=== 2016 ===
A typical weekday and Saturday service is five trains per hour to Glasgow Central (one train per hour in each direction on the Cathcart Circle, two from Neilston and one from Newton via Kirkhill), two trains per hour to Neilston and one train per hour to Newton (the one other hourly train to/from Newton runs via Langside). A Sunday service is almost the same except the Cathcart Circle trains do not operate. As a result, only three trains per hour operate to Glasgow Central.

=== Routes ===
Preceding station	National Rail	Following station
Mount Florida	ScotRail; Cathcart Circle Lines	Queen's Park
	Historical railways	
Mount Florida; Line and station open	Caledonian Railway; Cathcart District Railway	Queen's Park; Line and station open
