= Mount Florida =

Area in Glasgow, Scotland

Coordinates: 55.8224°N 4.2569°W

Mount Florida: Scottish Gaelic: Cnoc Florida
- Location within Glasgow
- OS grid reference: NS587611
- Council area: Glasgow City Council
- Lieutenancy area: Glasgow
- Country: Scotland
- Sovereign state: United Kingdom
- Post town: GLASGOW
- Postcode district: G42
- Dialling code: 0141
- Police: Scotland
- Fire: Scottish
- Ambulance: Scottish
- UK Parliament: Glasgow South
- Scottish Parliament: Glasgow Cathcart

Mount Florida (Scottish Gaelic: Cnoc Florida) is an area in the south-east of the city of Glasgow, Scotland.

== Origins ==
The Glasgow district of Mount Florida originated on the "Lands of Mount Floridon", which were described in detail when offered for sale at auction on 21 September 1814. The notice in the city's Herald newspaper described the estate as consisting of upwards of 15 acres (6.1 ha), with a mansion house containing two dwellings and gardens well stocked with fruit trees.

Contemporary maps from the 1850s show the old house renamed as "Mount Florida, (Ruin)". It was entered from Prospecthill Road and consisted of two semi-detached dwellings and surrounding gardens.

Much of the present suburb is situated in the area to the south of the old house. This ground was part of the "Lands of Clincart", which were put up for sale by auction on 28 June 1836. A farmhouse and 95 acres (38 ha) of land were offered for potential residential development. The area was incorporated into the city officially in 1891.

Clincart Farm itself was purchased by Queen's Park F.C., who adapted and incorporated the buildings into facilities for Lesser Hampden (their reserve team ground) in the 1920s. Around a century later it was reckoned to be the oldest existing building in the world directly used for football activities; however it was never listed and (with a new pavilion having been built in 2013) had fallen into some disrepair by the end of 2021, at which point the club decided to demolish it as part of the work to upgrade Lesser Hampden to their main stadium.

== Details ==
Mount Florida is served by the Mount Florida railway station which lies upon the Cathcart Circle railway line. The area is home to Langside College and the New Victoria Hospital which opened in 2009 on the fringe of Queen's Park. Primarily a residential area, the housing stock largely comprises traditional tenemental buildings with the addition of two of Glasgow's high rise structures (Battlefield Court and Langside Court), which dominated much of the 1960s housing regeneration in the city. The main road through the area is Cathcart Road, a major route through Glasgow's south side.

Scotland's national football stadium, Hampden Park, is located off Cathcart Road in the heart of Mount Florida. The 51,866-seater stadium, opened in 1903 and significantly renovated in the 1990s, is home to the Scottish Football Association, and to Queen's Park F.C. until 2021. The stadium has also played host to numerous large music events and was the Track and field events stadium for the 2014 Commonwealth Games. Mount Florida is also home to numerous lawn bowling clubs, including Glasgow's Indoor Centre. The local green area of Cathkin Park in the north of the neighbourhood beside Holyrood Secondary School and sports centre (officially in Crosshill) was also once a football stadium, home of the now defunct club Third Lanark and of Queen's Park prior to that.

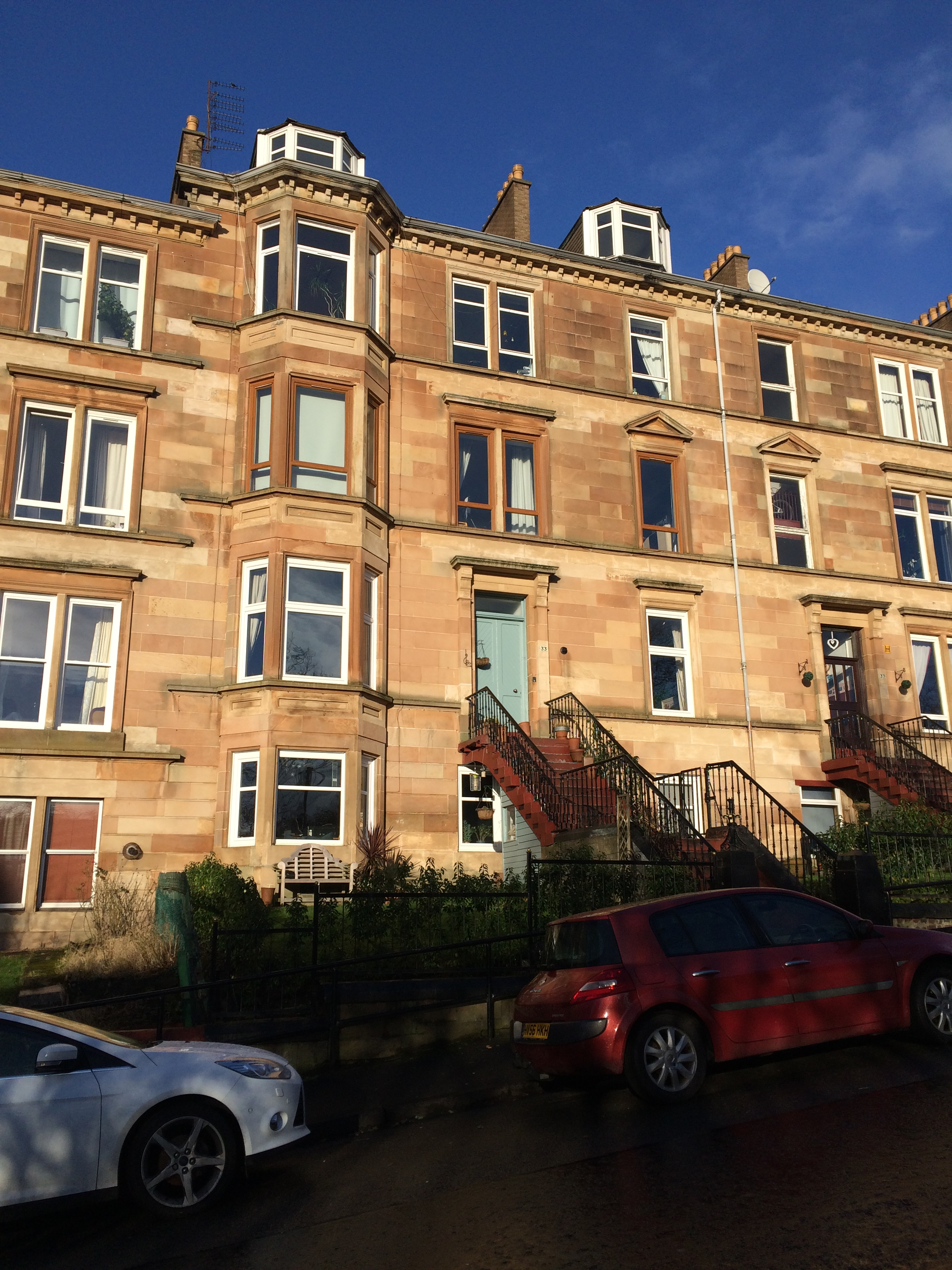
The Netflix series Lovesick used this flat in Mount Florida for its external scenes.

Mount Florida is in the Langside ward for Glasgow City Council and since May 2022 has been represented by Councillors Susan Aitken, Holly Bruce, Stephen Docherty and Paul Leinster. The neighbourhood lies within the Glasgow Cathcart Scottish Parliamentary constituency; the sitting MSP is James Dornan. Mount Florida is in the Glasgow South UK Parliament constituency; the sitting MP is Stewart McDonald.

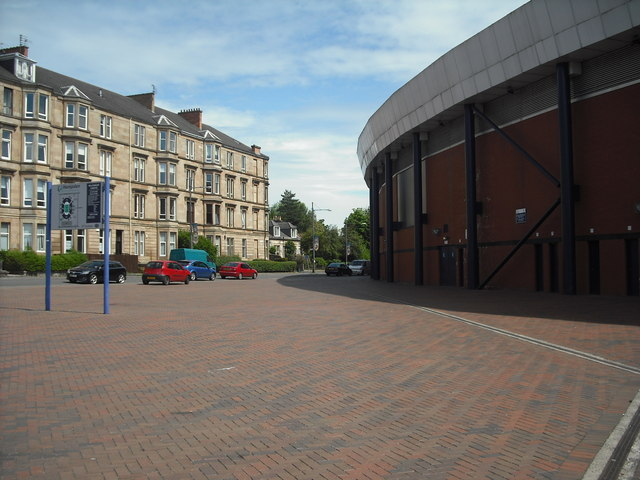
The northwest corner of Hampden Park

As part of the system of local democratic representation, there is an active community council.

Creation Records founder Alan McGee and Primal Scream vocalist Bobby Gillespie both grew up in the area and attended Kings Park Secondary School in nearby Simshill. Mount Florida has also produced an eponymous Glasgow musical group, who were signed to Matador Records. They have to date one album by the title 'Arrived Phoenix', released 30 January 2001. The Glasgow-based novelist, J. David Simons, grew up in the nearby Kings Park district and attended Mount Florida Primary School in the late 1950s.

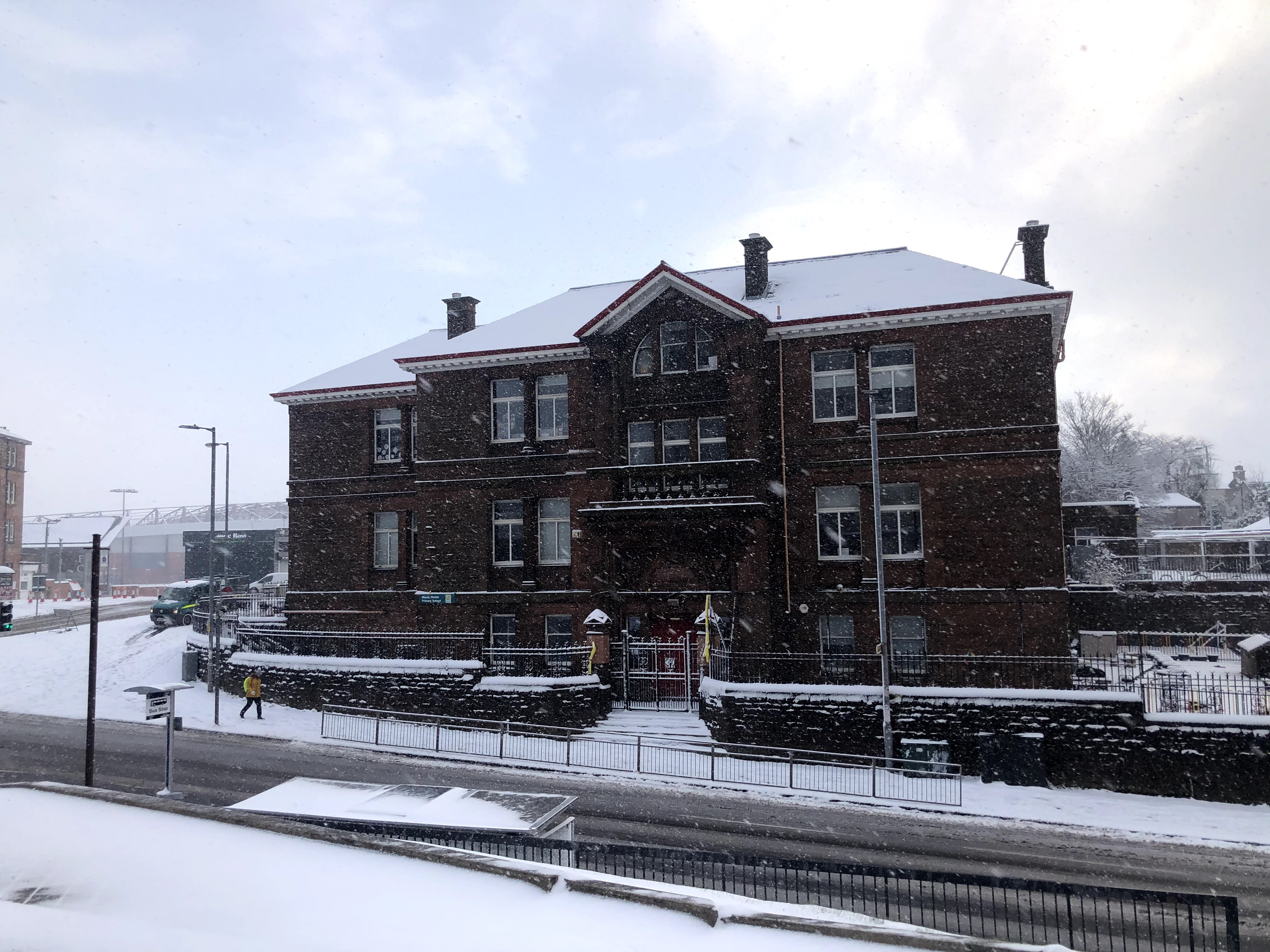
Mount Florida Primary School in the Snow

Mount Florida Primary School is situated between Cathcart Road and Carmunnock Road. The school was designed for Cathcart School Board by H & D Barclay and erected in 1895–1897.

== See also ==
- Glasgow tower blocks
- Hampden Park
