= Kings Park station =

Kings Park station may refer to:

- Kings Park station (LIRR)
- King's Park railway station
