= King's Park railway station =

Railway station in Glasgow, Scotland

King's Park Scottish Gaelic: Pàirc an Rìgh
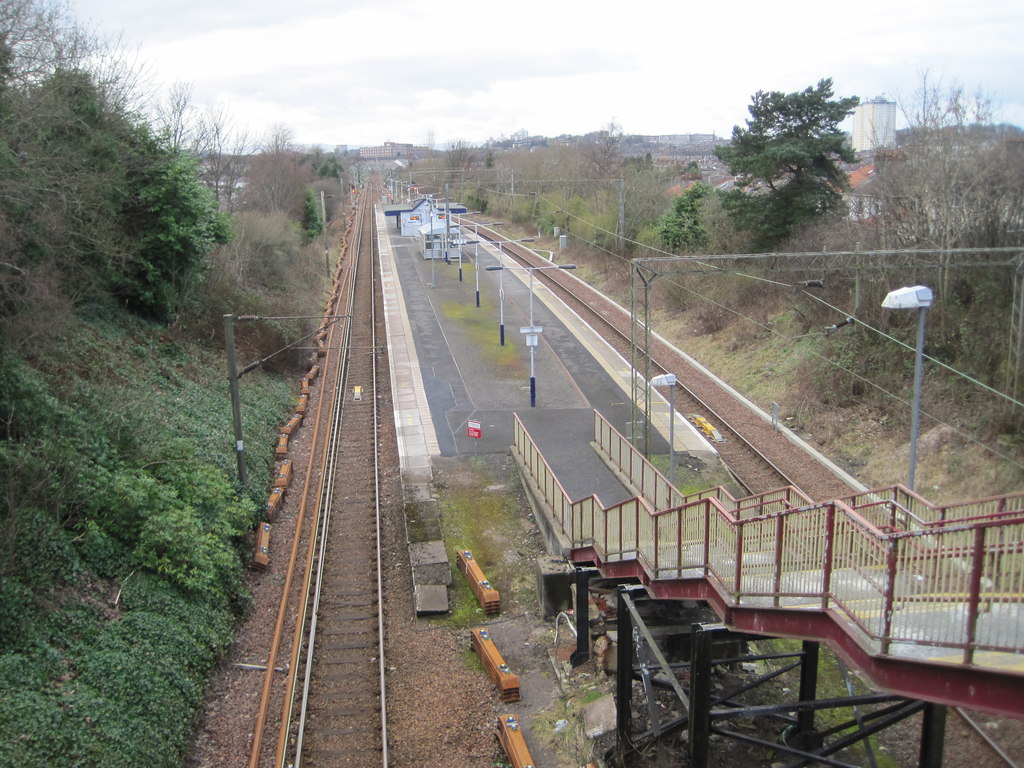
- Overview of the station, looking west towards Langside and Mount Florida

General information
- Location: King's Park, Glasgow; Scotland
- Coordinates: 55.81958°N 4.24653°W
- Grid reference: NS593607
- Manager: ScotRail
- Platforms: 2

Other information
- Station code: KGP

History
- Original company: London, Midland and Scottish Railway
- Post-grouping: London, Midland and Scottish Railway; British Railways

Key dates
- 10 September 1928: Station opened

Passengers
- 2021/22: ▲0.108 million
- 2022/23: ▲0.147 million
- 2023/24: ▲0.178 million
- 2024/25: ▲0.192 million
- 2025/26: 0.192 million
Location
Notes
- Passenger statistics from the Office of Rail and Road

King's Park railway station is a railway station serving the King's Park and Simshill areas of Glasgow, Scotland. It is located on the Newton branch of the Cathcart Circle Line, which was electrified by British Railways in 1962. Services are provided by ScotRail on behalf of Strathclyde Partnership for Transport.

The Up (Kirkhill bound) platform is signalled for bi-directional running to enable Up trains to depart in the Down direction. In the past this has been used for trains from Langside to depart to Muirend on the Neilston Line. Nowadays trains only depart the 'wrong way' from this platform during times of disruption.

At time of electrification there was also an Up Loop, used for stabling Football Specials serving events at the nearby Hampden Park football stadium, although by the mid 1970s this had been lifted.

== Services ==
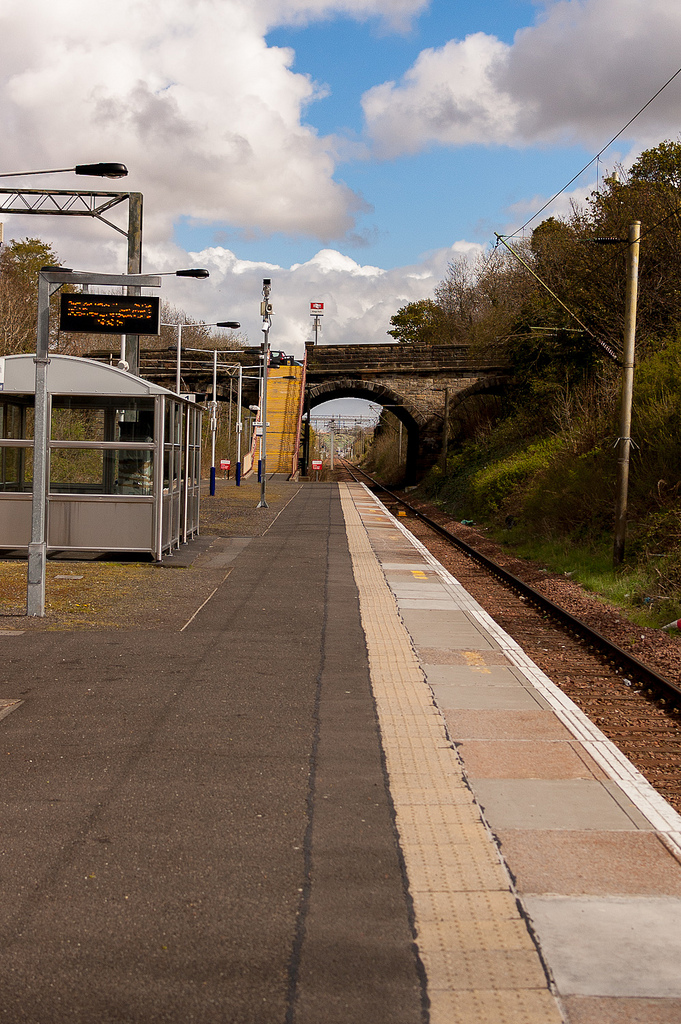
Westbound platform, looking towards Croftfoot.

There is a half-hourly service each day (including Sundays) towards Glasgow Central - one via Shawlands and one via Crosshill northbound, and to Newton southbound.

Preceding station	National Rail	Following station
Croftfoot	ScotRail; Glasgow-Newton via Crosshill	Mount Florida
Croftfoot	ScotRail; Glasgow-Newton via Shawlands	Langside
