= Cathcart Circle Lines =

Suburban railway lines in Glasgow

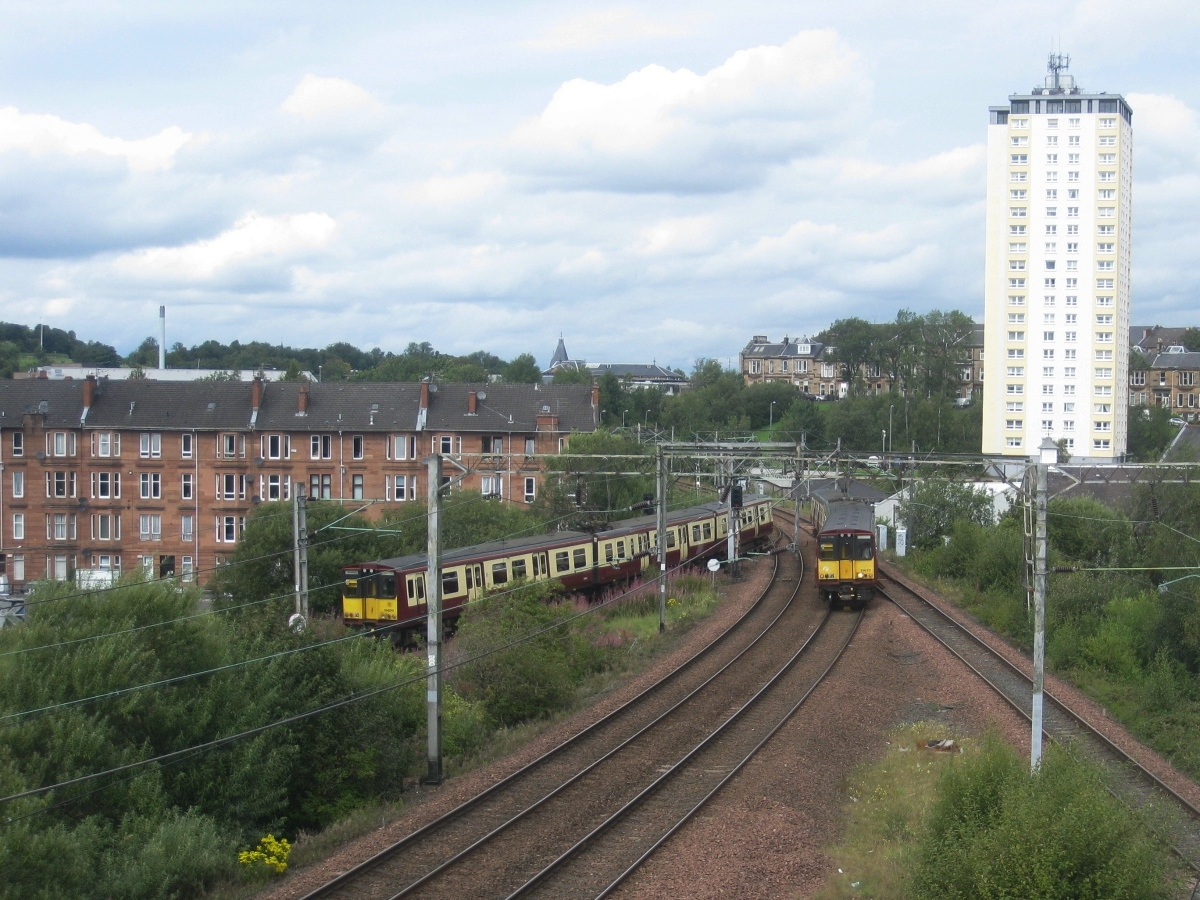
- Class 314s at Cathcart North Junction in 2011

Overview
- Status: Operational
- Owner: Network Rail
- Locale: Glasgow; East Renfrewshire; South Lanarkshire; Scotland
- Termini: Glasgow Central; Neilston / Newton / Cathcart
- Stations: 22

Service
- Type: Heavy rail
- System: National Rail
- Services: 4
- Operator: ScotRail
- Rolling stock: Class 318; Class 320; Class 380; Class 385

Technical
- Track gauge: 4 ft 8 1/2 in (1,435 mm)
- Electrification: 25 kV 50 Hz AC
Route map
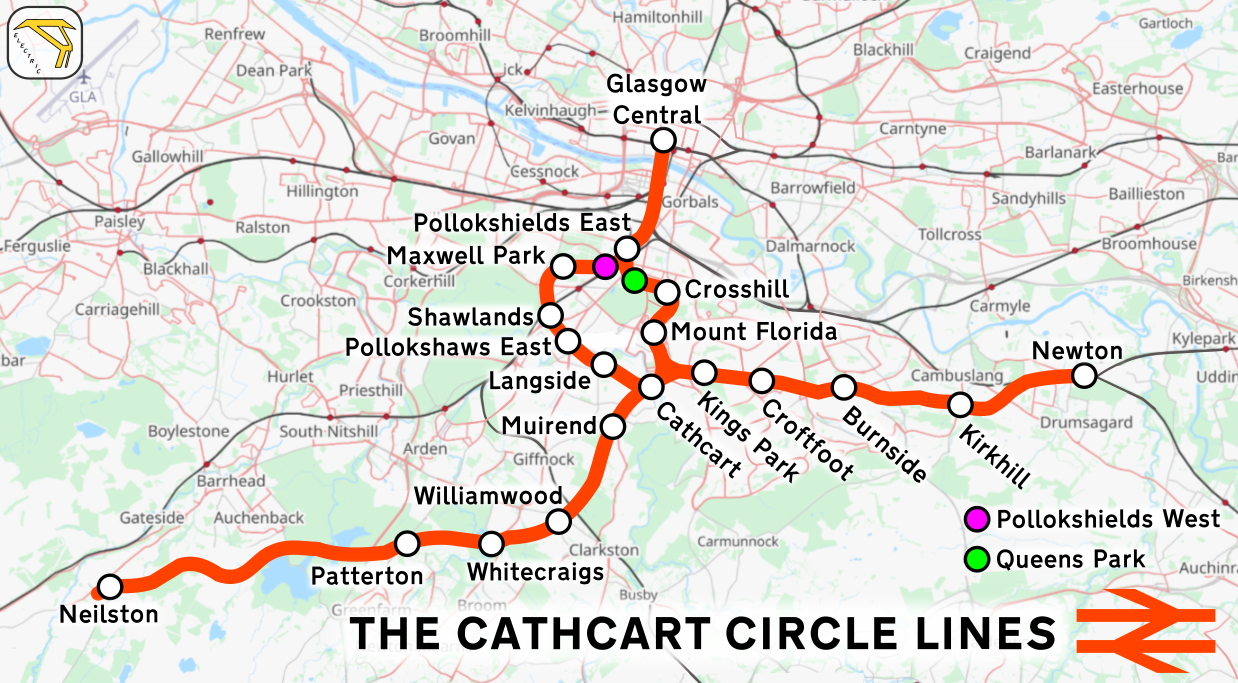

The Cathcart Circle Lines, sometimes known as the Cathcart Circle, form a mostly suburban railway route linking Glasgow (Central) to Cathcart via a circular line, with branches to Newton and Neilston, on the south bank of the River Clyde. They are part of the Strathclyde rail network.

== History ==
The lines were built by the Cathcart District Railway (Cathcart Circle) and the Lanarkshire and Ayrshire Railway (Newton and Neilston lines). The first part opened on 1 March 1886 as a double line from Glasgow Central to Mount Florida then single to Cathcart, doubled on 26 May 1886. The circular route back to Central station via Shawlands and Maxwell Park was completed on 2 April 1894.

The Newton and Neilston branches were built to provide a through route from the Lanarkshire coalfields to ports such as Ardrossan on the Ayrshire coast. There is still a junction with other lines at Newton, but the track beyond Neilston has been lifted.

The lines originally carried significant amounts of freight, but commuter trains are the only regular users now. Football Specials sometimes run to Mount Florida and King's Park for major matches at Hampden Park.

When the lines were built much of the land around them was open countryside. The existence of a commuter railway was a major factor in the development of Glasgow's southern suburbs, although until electrification in 1962 there was virtually no passenger service beyond Kirkhill by this route.

On weekdays the services have provided a vital transport link for school pupils and college students at nearby schools and higher education establishments, contributing to passenger numbers on top of the commuter traffic.

The lines under British Railways were electrified on Monday 28 May 1962 at the standard 25 kV AC, but originally 6.25 kV between Pollokshields East and Mount Florida because of limited clearances. The "Blue Trains", Class 303 units, which had dual voltage capability, replaced steam trains and early diesel units.

There was a trial run on the previous day, with over 5,500 passengers reported as using the new trains in their first morning rush hour.

Most of the track consists of jointed rail.

== Constituent lines ==
The lines comprise the following:

=== Cathcart Circle ===
The Cathcart Circle was built by the Cathcart District Railway and runs a circular route with both the eastern and western sections splitting from each other just before Pollokshields East railway station with the western section running through Pollokshields West, Maxwell Park, Shawlands, Pollokshaws East and Langside stations before meeting with the eastern section again at Cathcart station. The eastern section runs through Pollokshields East, Queens Park (Glasgow), Crosshill and Mount Florida stations before it reaches Cathcart.

=== Newton Line ===
The Newton Line was built by the Lanarkshire and Ayrshire Railway. It diverges from the Circle via a dive under junction south of Mount Florida and at Cathcart South Junction (south of Cathcart). The link at Cathcart South junction was put in place during electrification. From here it runs in an easterly direction towards Newton, where it joins with both the Hamilton branch of the Argyle Line and the West Coast Main Line (WCML). The Newton Line therefore provides a diversionary path for WCML expresses whenever engineering works close the fast lines via Cambuslang.

=== Neilston Line ===
The Neilston Line was built by the L&AR. It diverges from the Circle at Cathcart. The line used to connect to the Glasgow South Western Line at Lugton but was cut back to the current terminus at Neilston as part of the Beeching cuts in 1964. The section beyond Neilston was also not included in the 1962 electrification of the line.

== Passenger services ==
=== Following electrification in 1962 ===
Round the west side of the Circle onto the L&AR lines eastbound, terminating at Kirkhill. East side services ran to Newton, with many extended to Motherwell via the Clydesdale Junction Railway.

The basic service every 30 minutes was Glasgow Central to Neilston via Mount Florida; Central to Motherwell via Mount Florida; Glasgow Central to Kirkhill via Maxwell Park; and Cathcart Circle (Inner and Outer).

=== West Coast Main Line electrification 1974 ===
This included the Hamilton Circle and resulted in east side services terminating at Newton. Peak services from east and west sides operated to Motherwell via Blantyre and Hamilton.

=== Argyle Line opening in 1979 ===
The major change was the extension of west side services from Kirkhill to Newton.

Until May 1984 there were four trains an hour on the Newton branch (two via Maxwell Park and two via Queen's Park) and two trains an hour in each direction around the Circle, in addition to the services on the Neilston branch.

From May 1984, both the Newton and Neilston services remained two per hour, none turned back at Kirkhill and only one ran the full circle each way.

=== 2006/07 ===
Services were operated by First ScotRail, with services using Class 314 electric multiple units.

=== 2014 ===
The basic service (Monday to Sunday) is every 30 minutes from Glasgow Central to Neilston via Mount Florida and every hour from Glasgow Central to Newton via Mount Florida, Glasgow Central to Newton via Maxwell Park and the inner and outer Circle service (does not operate on Sundays).

This frequency gives a 30-minute service on the west side of the Circle, Neilston and Newton branches, three trains per hour at Cathcart and four trains per hour between Glasgow Central and Mount Florida. These service levels are less than those of the 1960s.

At peak times the above services combine to have trains running approximately every 5–10 minutes between Glasgow Central and Cathcart, where line capacity permits. Several trains are formed of the maximum six cars at these times. Commuter levels on this line are quite high and therefore a high density service is required at such busy periods.

=== 2024 ===
The line now features a number of different services, with frequencies similar to those before the COVID-19 pandemic. Basic service levels (Monday to Sunday, off-peak) give two trains per hour between Glasgow Central and Neilston, one train per hour between Newton and Glasgow Central via Maxwell Park and one train per hour between Newton and Glasgow Central via Crosshill. There are also two trains per hour which operate a loop service from Glasgow Central to Glasgow Central via Cathcart. One train per hour operates clockwise, calling first at Pollokshields East, and the other anti-clockwise. A daily express service also operates between Neilston and Glasgow Central in the morning peak, serving all stations between Neilston and Muirend, then operating non-stop to Glasgow Central.

Services are predominantly operated by the Class 380, with Class 318 and Class 320 units often operating during peak hours for extra capacity.

== Rolling stock ==
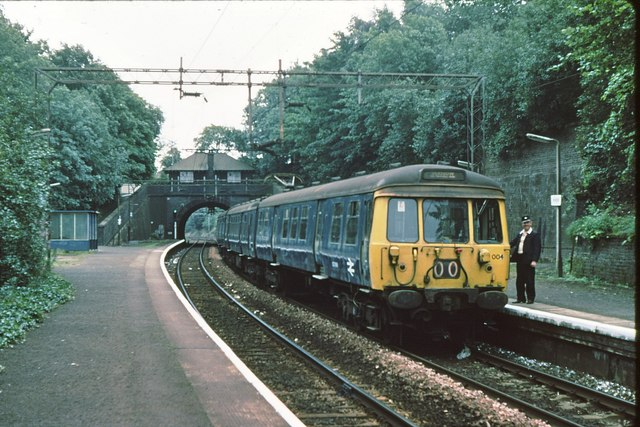
The Class 303 "Blue Trains" (pictured at Kirkhill railway station) were introduced on the Cathcart Circle upon electrification, surviving until 2002.

Upon electrification in 1962, Class 303s. Following electrification of the Inverclyde Line in 1967, Class 311 units were also used. Following the introduction of the Class 318 in 1986, they made occasional trips onto the Circle. The Class 311 were withdrawn in 1990, and following the introduction of the Class 334 the Class 303 were withdrawn in 2002 and a major redeployment of the fleet took place, resulting in the Class 314s taking over the line.

In 2014 Class 314s primarily operated the Circle (including Newton, Neilston services).

From December 2016, Class 320s were introduced to the line, working the Circle and Newton via Maxwell Park routes to permit an increase in Class 314 workings on the Inverclyde Line. This was due to a number of Class 380s being reserved for driver training on the newly electrified Glasgow to Edinburgh via Falkirk High route. From the December 2018 timetable change, Class 380s began operating most Neilston services, along with some Circle and Newton services. During 2019 the withdrawal of Class 314s from the ScotRail network took place, and as of 2024 a mixture of Class 318s, 320s and 380s operate the lines.

== Future ==
=== Light rail conversion ===
There have been proposals to convert the lines to a tram line, but never beyond the initial suggestion stage. Most recently, in December 2008 Transport Scotland's Strategic Transport Projects Review suggested an upgrade of the Circle to light rail as part of a wider light rail network for Glasgow, incorporating both new lines and re-purposed older alignments. If taken forward, this proposal was supposed to have been implemented during the period 2012 - 2022, in line with the scope of the strategic review.

=== Glasgow Metro ===
The Cathcart Circle has been identified as one of the heavy rail lines that would be converted to metro as part of the proposals for the Glasgow Metro project. No timescale or budget has been released so far, but it is anticipated that it would be one of the first metro lines given that most of the infrastructure is already in place.

=== Balgray Station ===
A new station on the Neilston line at Balgray situated south of the town of Barrhead in East Renfrewshire is currently under construction as of July 2025 with an expected opening date of autumn 2026 the station will be located slightly to the west of the planned but never constructed Lyoncross station.

On 9 July, Network Rail announced the railway station would open on 27 September 2026, several weeks earlier than the anticipated November schedule.
