= Langside railway station =

Railway station in Glasgow, Scotland

Langside Scottish Gaelic: An Leathad Fada
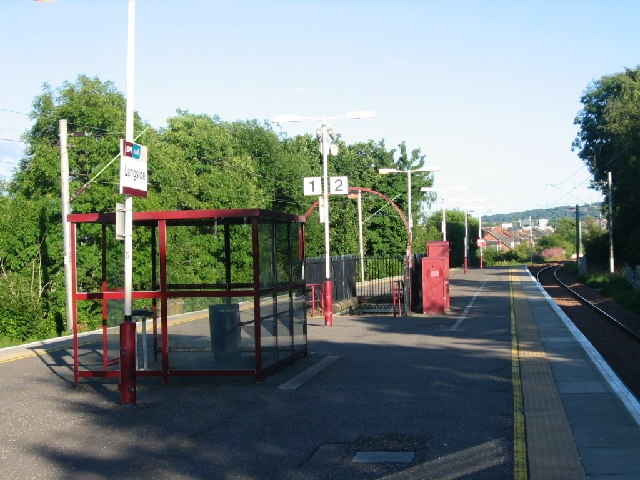
- 2005 view of station after removal of station building

General information
- Location: Langside and Newlands, Glasgow; Scotland
- Coordinates: 55.8208°N 4.2759°W
- Grid reference: NS574609
- Manager: ScotRail
- Transit authority: SPT
- Platforms: 2

Other information
- Station code: LGS
- Fare zone: 1

History
- Original company: Cathcart District Railway
- Pre-grouping: Caledonian Railway
- Post-grouping: LMS

Key dates
- 2 April 1894: Opened as Langside
- 5 November 1900: Signal box closed
- 1 October 1901: Renamed as Langside and Newlands
- 1905: Signal box reopened during morning peak
- 23 August 1927: Signal box closed and equipment removed
- 27 May 1962: Renamed as Langside
- 13 August 1966: Original station building burnt down

Passengers
- 2021/22: ▲0.110 million
- 2022/23: ▲0.141 million
- 2023/24: ▲0.196 million
- 2024/25: ▲0.226 million
- 2025/26: ▲0.232 million
Location
Notes
- Passenger statistics from the Office of Rail and Road

Langside railway station is a railway station that serves the Langside and Newlands area of Glasgow, Scotland. It is located on the Cathcart Circle Line. Services are provided by ScotRail. Services had previously been provided by ScotRail on behalf of Strathclyde Passenger Transport.

== History ==
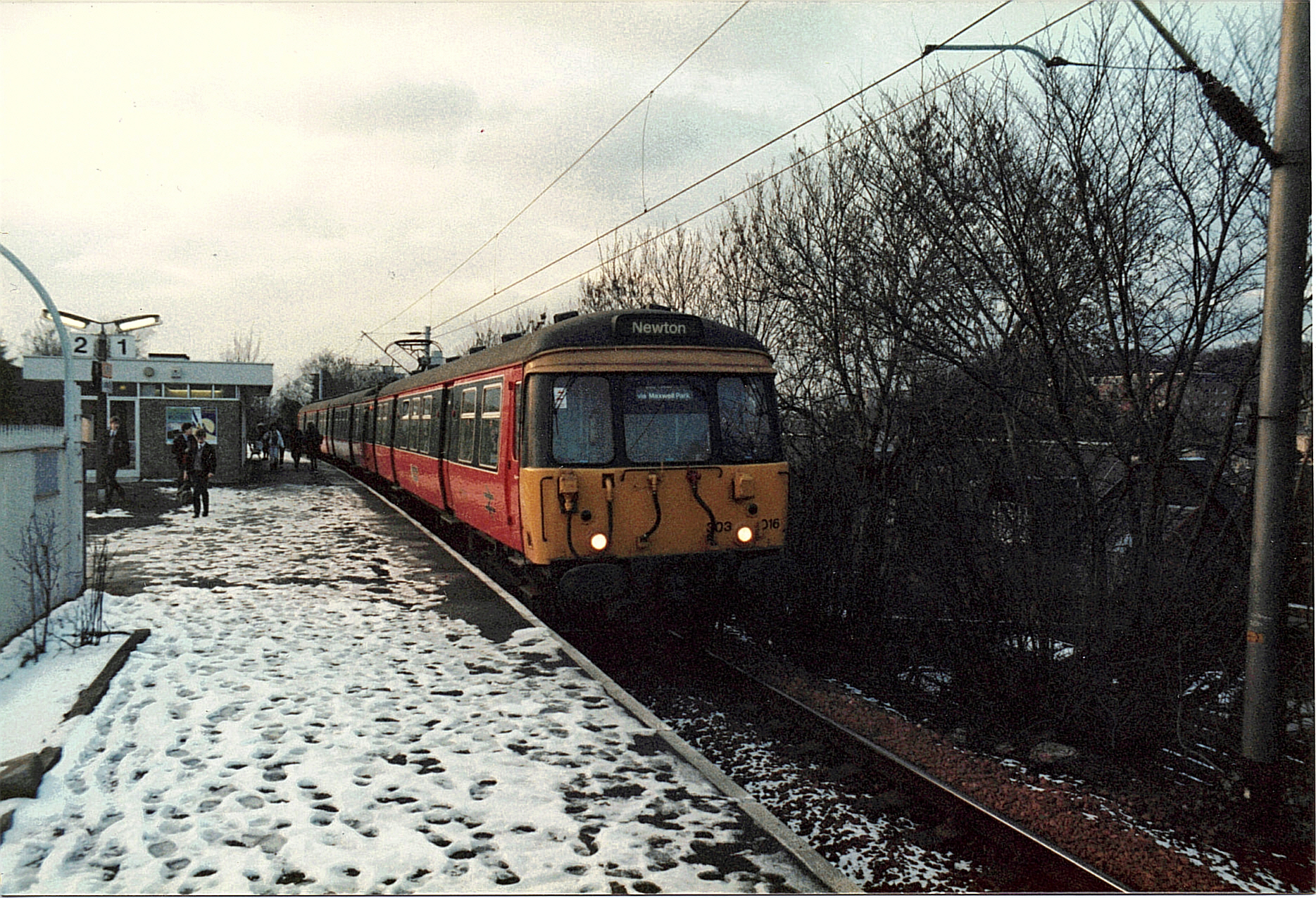
1960s station building with a British Rail Class 303 No. 303 016 on a service to Newton (1986)

The station was opened as part of the western extension of the Cathcart District Railway on 2 April 1894. It consists of a single island platform accessed by a subway and stairs to Langside Drive at the west end, and to Earls Park Avenue (north exit) and Tannahill Road (south exit) at the east end, with a self-service ticket machine added in spring 2007. The Cathcart Circle Line has been electrified since 1962 by British Railways.

== Services ==
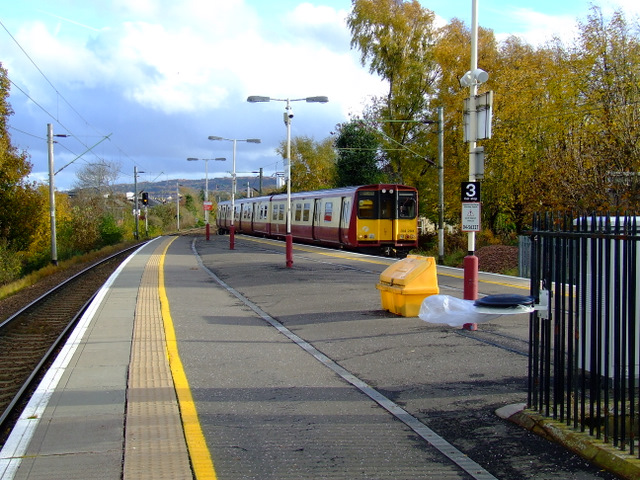
Train arriving into Langside

=== 1974 to 1979 ===
Between the electrification of the WCML and the opening of the Argyle Line, trains ran Mondays to Saturdays, with two Cathcart Circle trains per hour in each direction and two Glasgow Central to Kirkhill trains per hour in each direction. Occasional peak hour trains were extended through to Motherwell via the Hamilton Circle lines.

=== 1979 to early 1990s ===
Following the opening of the Argyle line, Kirkhill services were extended through to Newton.

=== Early 1990s to present day (2016) ===
The service pattern has been revised to include Sunday trains.

The service consists of one train between Glasgow Central and Newton in each direction every hour, seven days a week and one Cathcart Circle train in each direction on Mondays to Saturdays.

There is a higher frequency of trains in the weekday morning and evening rush hour periods.

=== Routes ===
Preceding station	National Rail	Following station
Cathcart	ScotRail; Glasgow Central - Neilston	Pollokshaws East
King's Park	ScotRail; Glasgow Central - Newton	Pollokshaws East
	Historical railways	
Cathcart; Line and station open	Caledonian Railway; Cathcart District Railway	Pollokshaws East; Line and station open
