= Neilston railway station =

Railway station in East Renfrewshire, Scotland

Neilston Scottish Gaelic: Baile Nèill
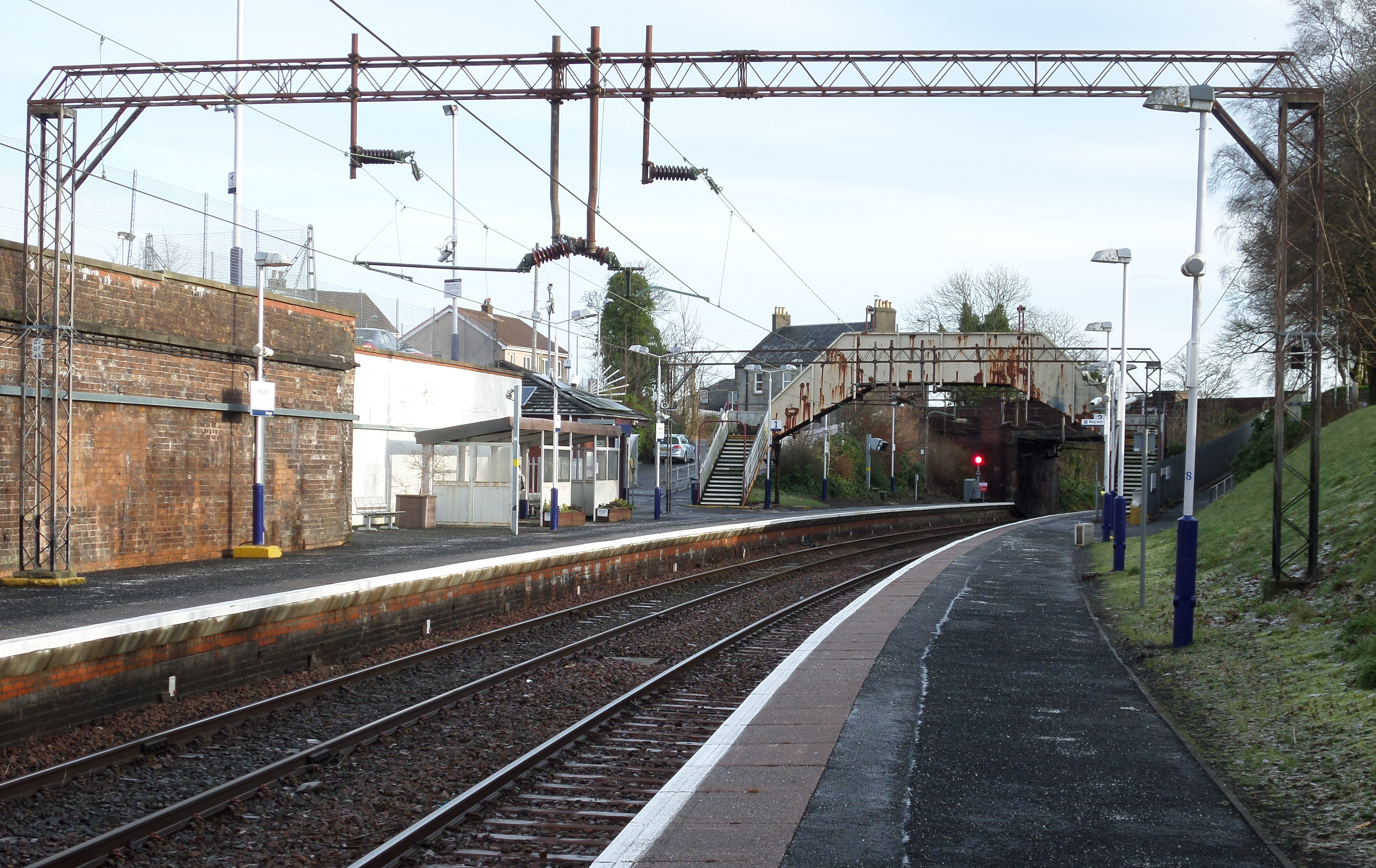

General information
- Location: Neilston, East Renfrewshire; Scotland
- Coordinates: 55.7829°N 4.4269°W
- Grid reference: NS479570
- Manager: ScotRail
- Transit authority: SPT
- Platforms: 2

Other information
- Station code: NEI

History
- Original company: Lanarkshire and Ayrshire Railway
- Pre-grouping: Caledonian Railway
- Post-grouping: LMS

Key dates
- 1 May 1903: Opened
- 1 January 1917: Closed
- 2 March 1919: Re-opened
- 2 June 1924: Renamed Neilston High
- 6 May 1974: Renamed Neilston

Passengers
- 2021/22: ▲0.275 million
- 2022/23: ▲0.306 million
- 2023/24: ▲0.358 million
- 2024/25: ▲0.376 million
- 2025/26: ▼0.349 million
Location
Notes
- Passenger statistics from the Office of Rail and Road

Neilston railway station is a railway station in the village of Neilston, East Renfrewshire, Greater Glasgow, Scotland. The station is managed by ScotRail and lies on the Cathcart Circle Lines, 11 3/4 miles (18.9 km) southwest of Glasgow Central.

== History ==
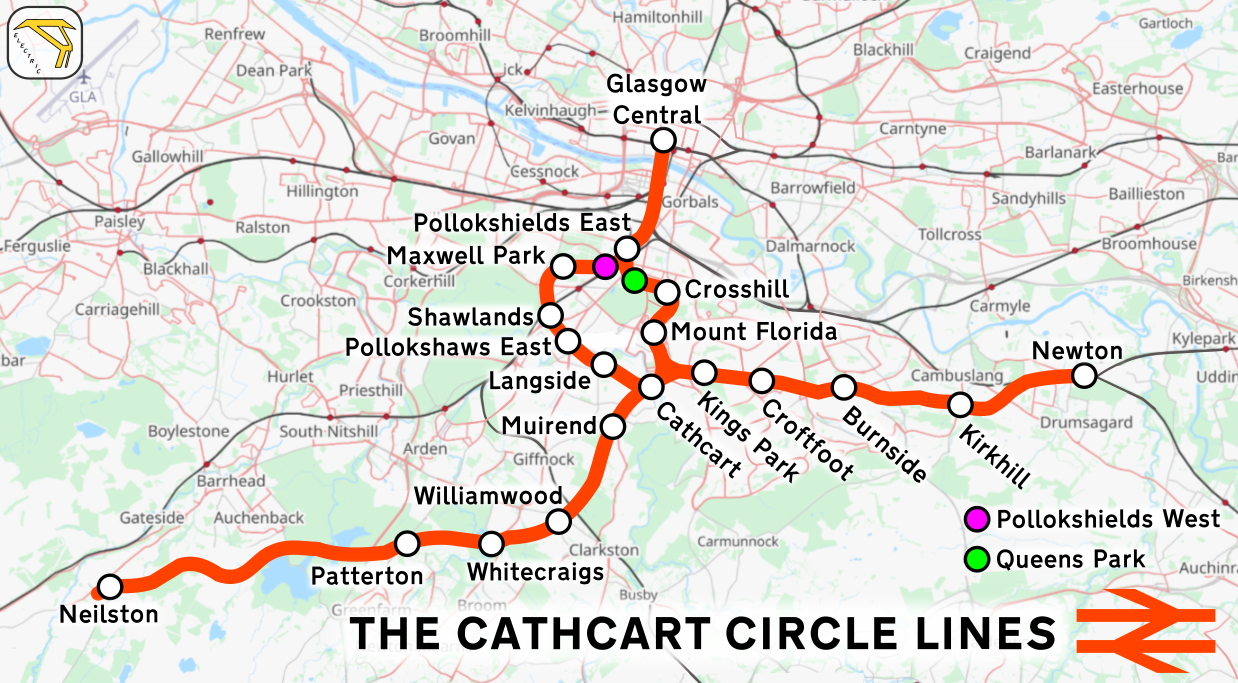
Cathcart Circle Lines route map

The station was originally opened as part of the Lanarkshire and Ayrshire Railway on 1 May 1903. It closed between 1 January 1917 and 2 March 1919 due to wartime economy, and upon the grouping of the L&AR into the London, Midland and Scottish Railway in 1923, the station was renamed Neilston High on 2 June 1924. It was renamed back to Neilston on 6 May 1974 by British Rail.

The station is fully operational today as the terminal station on the Glasgow Central – Neilston line. The railway was electrified in May 1962 (using overhead wires supplying 25 kV A.C) and Class 303 "Blue Train" electric multiple units provided almost all train services for many years thereafter, being joined by the similar Class 311 from 1967. Following withdrawal of the Class 303 and 311, Class 314 were the mainstay of the service until their withdrawal in 2019, with occasional services operated by Class 318, Class 334 and Class 320. As of 2022 train services are operated by Class 318, Class 320, Class 380 and Class 385.

The line previously continued southwest to Uplawmoor, but this section closed to passengers in April 1962 and to all traffic in December 1964. British Rail also put forward plans to close the station here in the early 1980s and cut the branch back to Whitecraigs, but the proposals were never implemented.

== Layout and facilities ==
Although the station is a terminus, it has kept a conventional two platform layout with separate tracks for arrivals & departures. The two lines merge into a single reversing siding immediately west of the station (on the course of the old L&AR line to Uplawmoor) and terminating trains use this to change platforms before returning east to Glasgow. It is a staffed station, with step-free access to each platform via ramps (although these are quite steep) and a roadbridge at the eastern end linking the two. A P.A system and passenger information screens provide train running information.

== Services ==
There is a daily half-hourly service from Neilston to Glasgow Central via Queens Park. The typical journey time is 30 minutes.

| Preceding station | National Rail | Following station |
|---|---|---|
| Terminus | ScotRail; Cathcart Circle Lines | Balgray |
| | Historical railways | |
| Uplawmoor; Line and station closed | Caledonian Railway; Lanarkshire and Ayrshire Railway | Lyoncross; Line open; station never constructed |

== Bibliography ==
- Brailsford, Martyn, ed. (December 2017) [1987]. Railway Track Diagrams 1: Scotland & Isle of Man (6th ed.). Frome: Trackmaps. ISBN 978-0-9549866-9-8.
- Butt, R. V. J. (October 1995). The Directory of Railway Stations: details every public and private passenger station, halt, platform and stopping place, past and present (1st ed.). Sparkford: Patrick Stephens Ltd. ISBN 978-1-85260-508-7. OCLC 60251199. OL 11956311M.
- Jowett, Alan (March 1989). Jowett's Railway Atlas of Great Britain and Ireland: From Pre-Grouping to the Present Day (1st ed.). Sparkford: Patrick Stephens Ltd. ISBN 978-1-85260-086-0. OCLC 22311137.
- Jowett, Alan (2000). Jowett's Nationalised Railway Atlas (1st ed.). Penryn, Cornwall: Atlantic Transport Publishers. ISBN 978-0-906899-99-1. OCLC 228266687.
- Stansfield, G. (1999). Ayrshire & Renfrewshire's Lost Railways. Ochiltree: Stenlake Publishing. ISBN 1-8403-3077-5.
