= Uplawmoor railway station =

Railway station in East Renfrewshire, Scotland

Uplawmoor
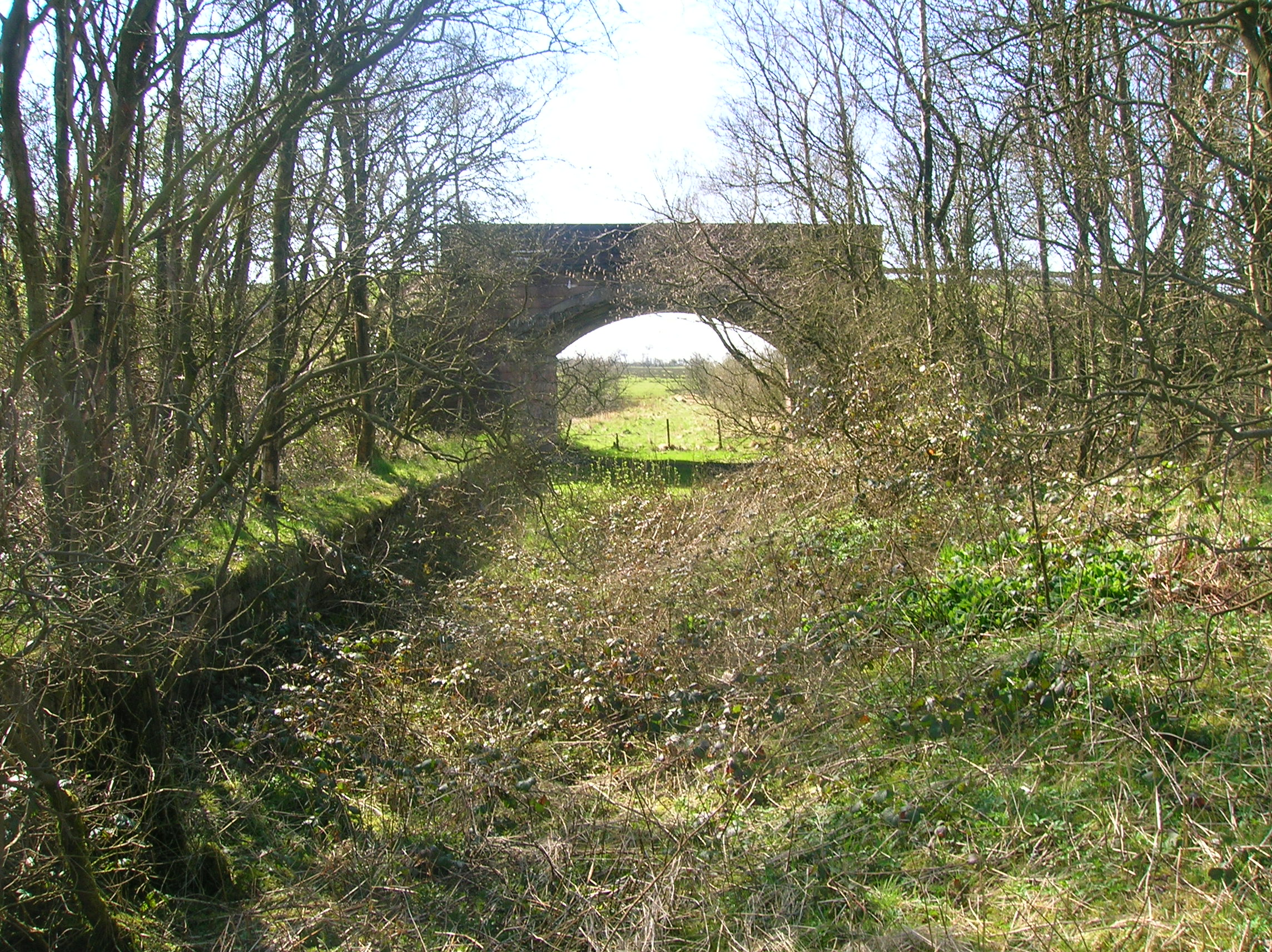
- Uplawmoor station site in 2007

General information
- Location: Uplawmoor, Renfrewshire; Scotland
- Coordinates: 55.7635°N 4.4910°W
- Grid reference: NS437550
- Platforms: 2

Other information
- Status: Disused

History
- Original company: Lanarkshire and Ayrshire Railway
- Pre-grouping: Caledonian Railway
- Post-grouping: LMS

Key dates
- 1 May 1903: Opened
- 1 January 1917: Closed
- 2 March 1919: Reopened
- 2 April 1962: Closed to regular services
Location

Uplawmoor railway station was a railway station serving the village of Uplawmoor, East Renfrewshire, Scotland as part of the Lanarkshire and Ayrshire Railway.

== History ==
The station opened on 1 May 1903. It closed between 1 January 1917 and 2 March 1919 due to wartime economy, and closed permanently to passengers and freight on 2 April 1962. Upon closure, the nearby station Caldwell took on the name 'Uplawmoor'.

Although the station was closed to regular passengers, in 1964 the Royal Train was stabled here overnight during a visit to the area by the Queen Mother.

Sidings ran to the Shillford Quarry that was located to the east of the station within Uplawmoor Wood.

Preceding station	Historical railways	Following station
Lugton High; Line and station closed	Caledonian Railway; Lanarkshire and Ayrshire Railway	Neilston; Line closed; station open

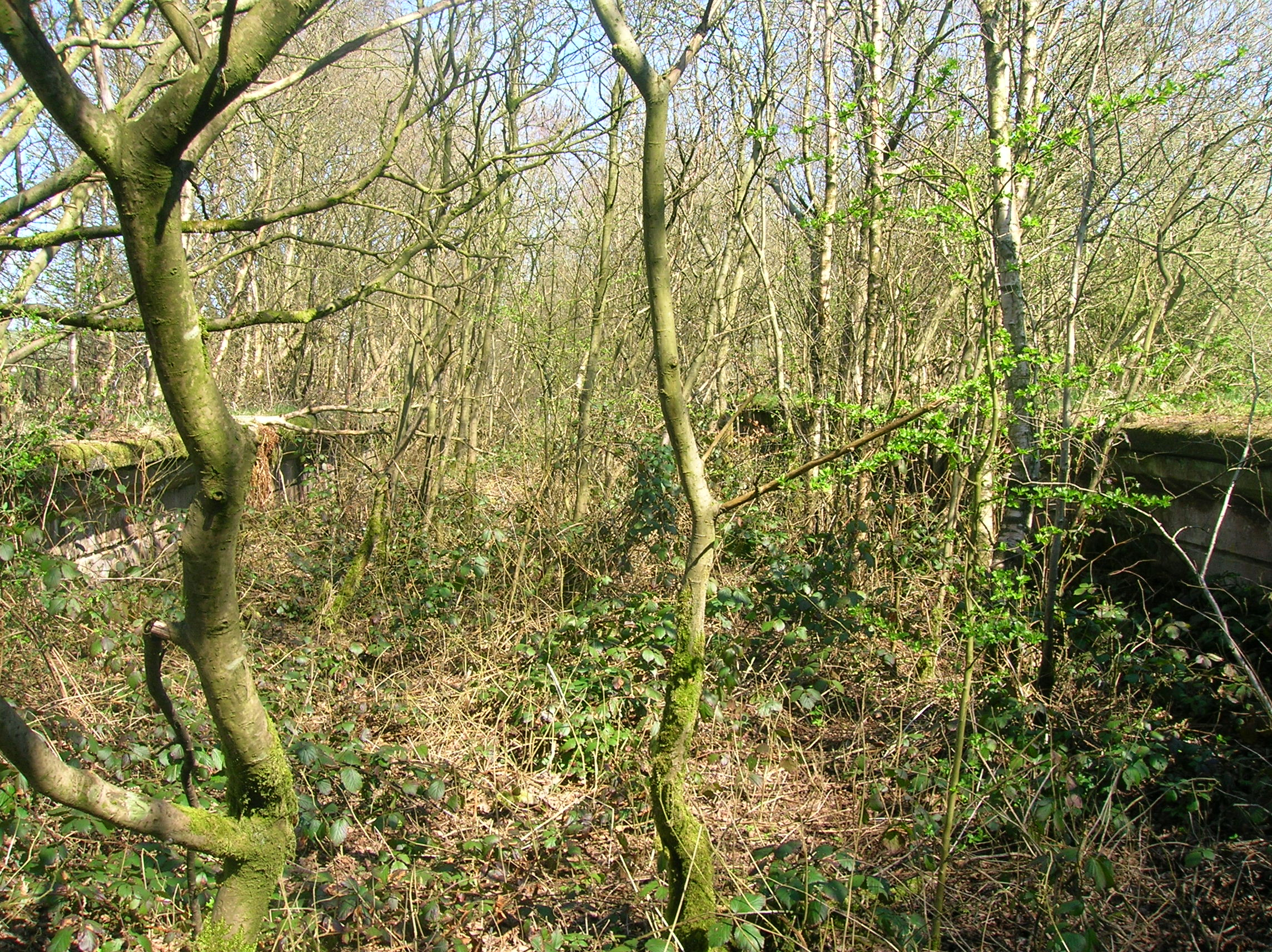
Station site in 2007, looking towards Neilston

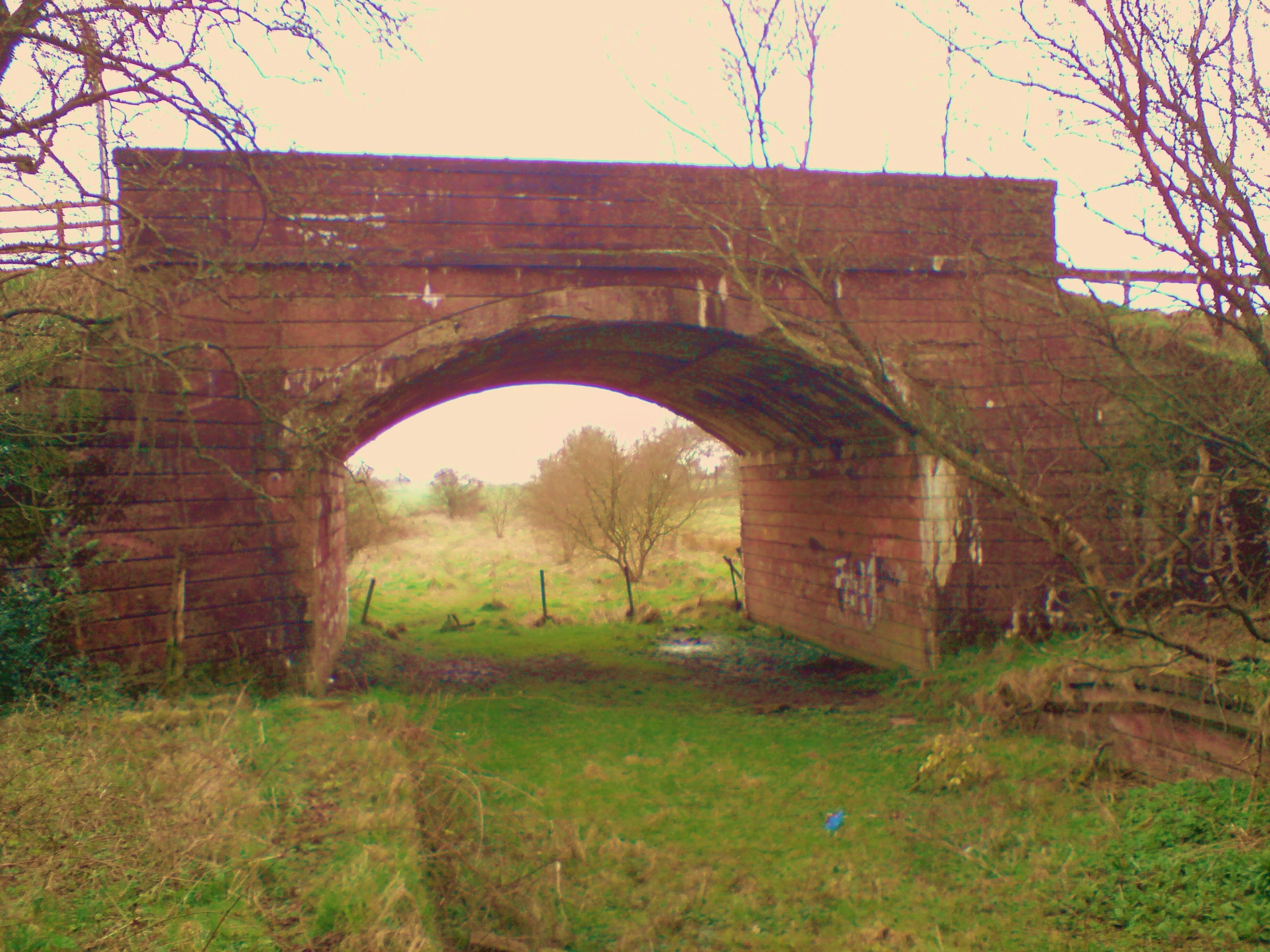
Station site in 2009, looking towards Lugton High

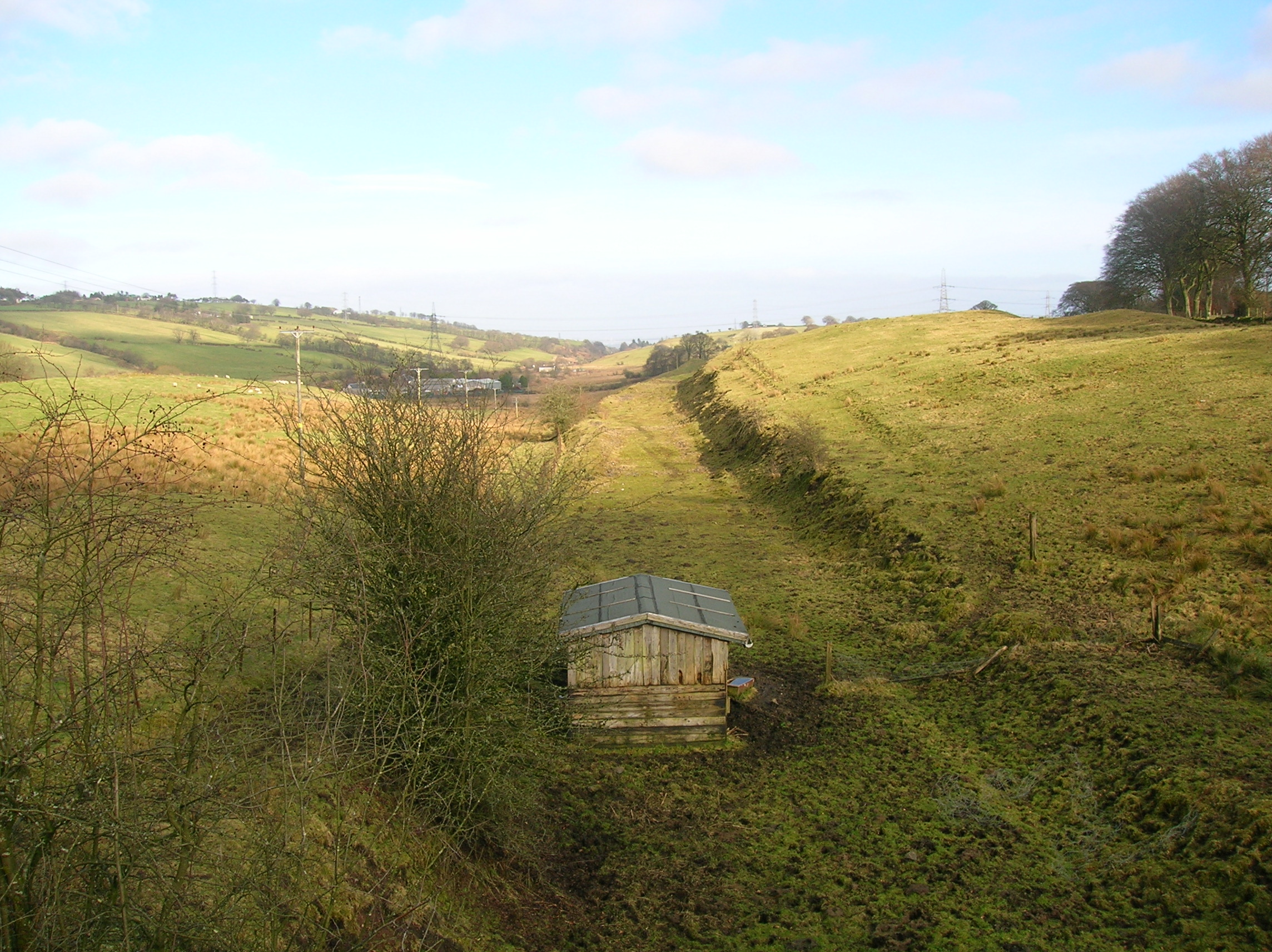
The railway alignment looking towards Neilston
