= British Rail Class 314 =

Class of British electric multiple unit trains (1979-2019)

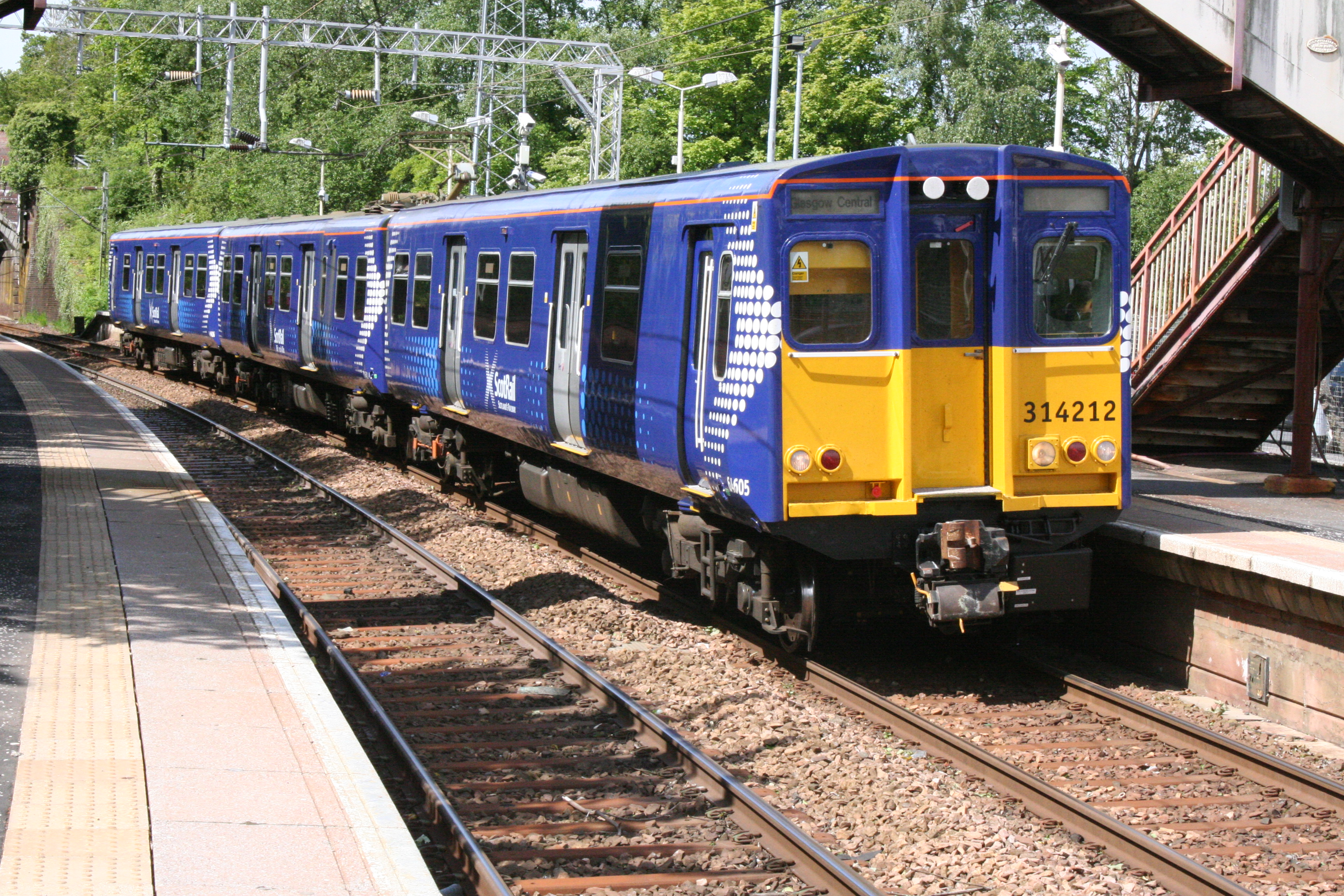
- First ScotRail Class 314 at Patterton in 2011

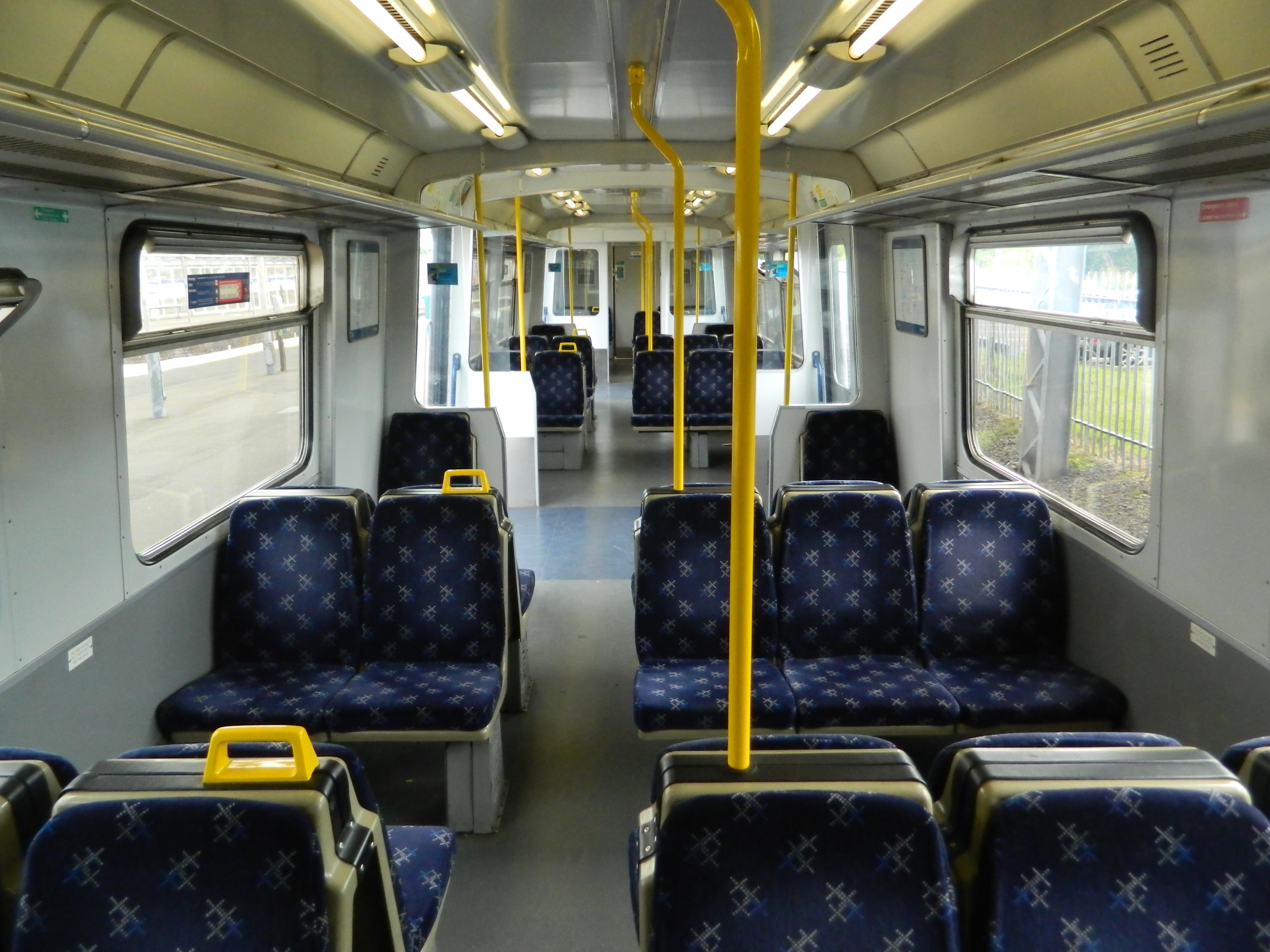
- Interior of a ScotRail refurbished Class 314 unit in 2018
- In service: 1979–2019
- Manufacturer: British Rail Engineering Limited
- Built at: Holgate Road Works, York
- Family name: BREL 1972
- Constructed: 1979
- Entered service: 1979
- Refurbished: 2006–2007; 2009–2010; 2011–2013
- Scrapped: 2019–2020
- Number built: 16
- Number preserved: 1 (Converted into Class 614)
- Number scrapped: 15
- Successor: Class 318; Class 320; Class 380; Class 385
- Formation: 3 cars per unit: DMSO-PTSO-DMSO
- Diagram: DMSO vehicles: EA206; PTSO vehicles: EH211
- Fleet numbers: 314201–314216
- Capacity: 212 seats
- Operators: British Rail; ScotRail (British Rail); ScotRail (National Express); First ScotRail; Abellio ScotRail
- Depots: Glasgow Shields Road; Glasgow Hyndland
- Lines served: Argyle Line; North Clyde Line; Cathcart Circle Lines; Inverclyde Line; Paisley Canal Line

Specifications
- Car body construction: Steel underframe with aluminium body and roof
- Car length: DM vehs.: 19.800 m (64 ft 11.5 in); Trailers: 19.920 m (65 ft 4.3 in)
- Width: 2.820 m (9 ft 3.0 in)
- Height: 3.582 m (11 ft 9.0 in)
- Floor height: 1.146 m (3 ft 9.1 in)
- Doors: Double-leaf pocket sliding, each 1.288 m (4 ft 2.7 in) wide (2 per side per car)
- Wheelbase: Over bogie centres: 14.170 m (46 ft 5.9 in)
- Maximum speed: 70 mph (113 km/h)
- Weight: DMSO: 34.6 t (34.1 long tons); PTSO: 33.0 t (32.5 long tons); Total: 102.2 t (100.6 long tons)
- Traction motors: 8 total; 4 per DMSO vehicle; (GEC G310AZ or Brush TM61-53, interchangeably)
- Power output: 660 kW (880 hp)
- Electric system: 25 kV 50 Hz AC overhead
- Current collection: Pantograph
- UIC classification: Bo′Bo′+2′2′+Bo′Bo′
- Bogies: BREL BX1
- Minimum turning radius: 70.4 m (231 ft 0 in)
- Braking system: Electro-pneumatic (disc)
- Safety systems: AWS; TPWS
- Coupling system: Tightlock
- Multiple working: Within class
- Track gauge: 1,435 mm (4 ft 8 1/2 in) standard gauge

Notes/references
- Specifications as at August 1982 except where otherwise noted.

The British Rail Class 314 is a retired class of alternating current electric multiple unit (EMU) trains built by British Rail Engineering Limited's Holgate Road carriage works in 1979. They were a class of units derived from British Rail's 1971 prototype suburban EMU design which, as the BREL 1972 family, eventually encompassed 755 vehicles over five production classes (313, 314, 315, 507 and 508).

The Class 314 fleet was used to operate inner-suburban services on the Strathclyde Passenger Transport rail network in and around Glasgow, most typically on the Argyle, North Clyde, Cathcart Circle, Paisley Canal and Inverclyde lines. The units, formed of three cars each, worked either independently or in six-car pairs.

Although the fleet had undergone a number of life-extension overhauls and upgrades, it was withdrawn from service in 2018–2019 as a result of non-compliance with the requirements of the Persons with Reduced Mobility Technical Specification for Interoperability (PRM-TSI), (Note: In addition to accommodations for persons with reduced mobility, the PRM-TSI also mandates provisions for people with sensory impairments. It supplants the existing Rail Vehicle Accessibility Regulations.) which became legally binding at the end of December 2019. It was replaced, for the most part, by cascaded Class 318 and Class 320 units following the introduction of the Class 385 fleet.

Following withdrawal, all but one unit was scrapped; the remaining unit has been converted to act as a technology demonstrator using hydrogen-powered fuel cells and was reclassified into Class 614 in October 2021.

== History ==
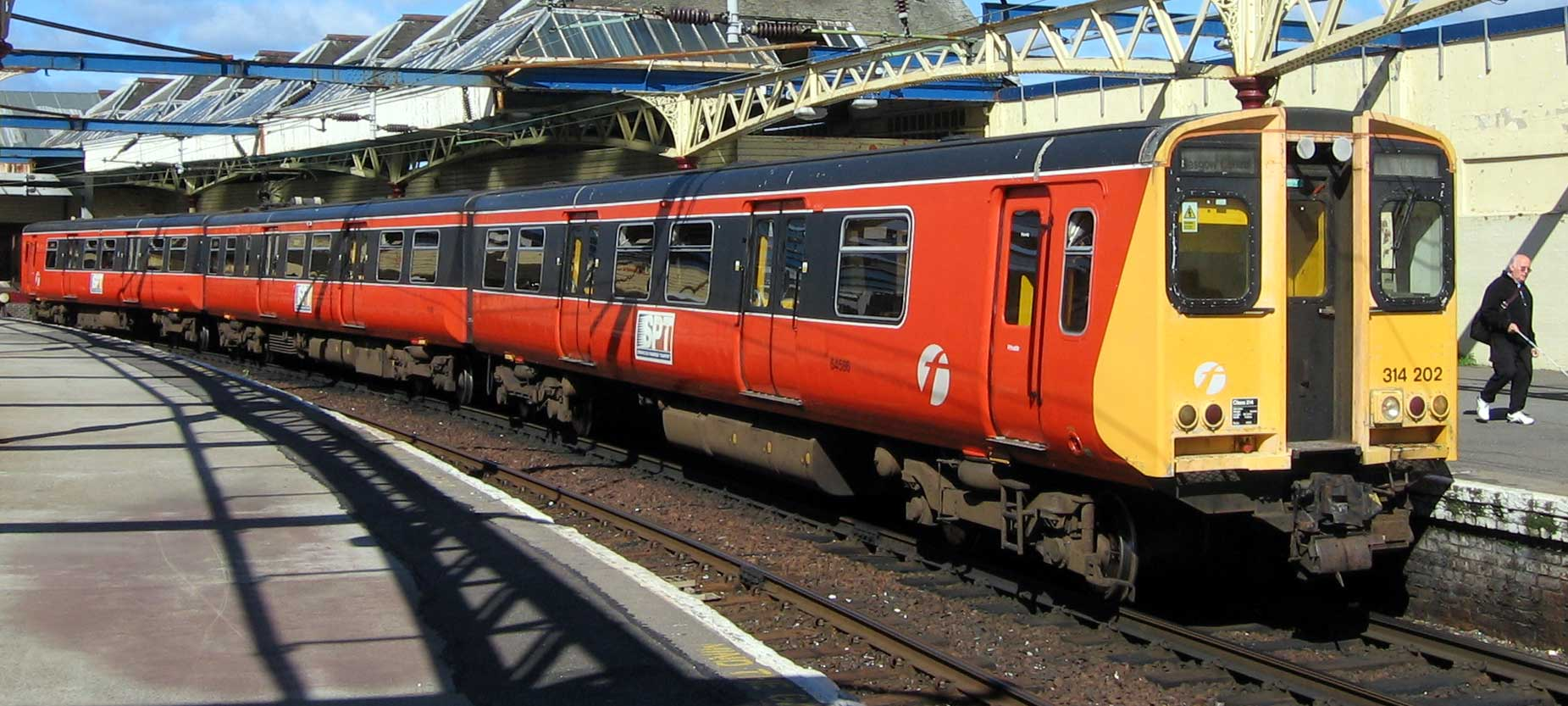
Class 314 at Gourock in Strathclyde Partnership for Transport orange and black livery at Gourock in 2006

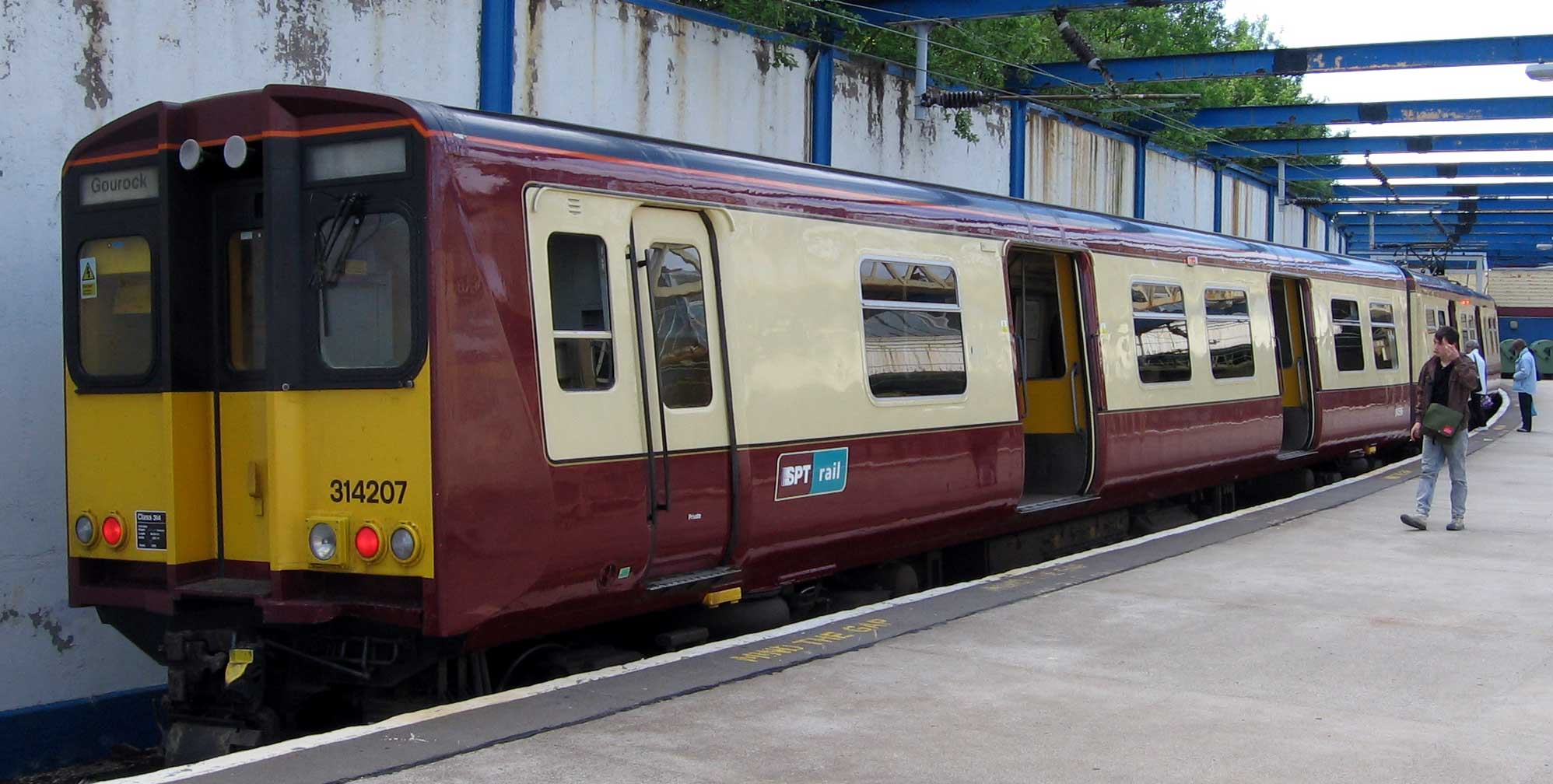
Class 314 in SPT carmine and cream livery at Gourock in 2006

Class 314 units were formed of two vehicles with driver's cabs sandwiching a trailer vehicles that carried the pantograph and high-voltage transformer. The 25 kV supply collected from the overhead lines by the pantograph was passed from the transformer in the intermediate trailer to four 110 horsepower (82 kW) direct current traction motors mounted under each driving car.

In common with the other classes of BREL's 1972 family, Class 314 vehicles were of constructed of aluminium alloy on a steel underframe and had pneumatically actuated sliding doors. Tightlock couplings allowed units to be coupled and uncoupled by the driver alone from within the cab, a simplification compared to the coupling procedure used by the Strathclyde network's then-existing Class 303 units.

The sixteen-strong Class 314 fleet had been acquired for the main purpose of operating the newly opened Argyle Line, which they did—along with the North Clyde Line—from introduction in late 1979 until October 1999. After this they were transferred to operate Cathcart Circle services on the southern side of the Strathclyde network, covering for the withdrawal and scrapping of the Class 303 fleet. A small number of Class 314 units also worked Inverclyde Line services to Gourock and Wemyss Bay, mostly during peak hours.

== Overhaul and refurbishment ==
A minor overhaul programme between May 2006 and mid-2007 included electrical upgrades and installation of improved door actuation mechanisms.

Between 2011 and 2013, five units received a C3 major overhaul at Railcare Springburn, which included corrosion repairs, repainting of internal surfaces, replacement of linoleum flooring material, replacement of seat covers, refurbishment of bogies and couplers, reliability upgrades and repainting into the then-new ScotRail Saltire livery. Eight other units underwent the C3 overhaul but were not repainted, while the remaining three units received the same internal refurbishment but a less-intensive C4 overhaul.

== Replacement and withdrawal ==
The increasing age of the Class 314 units, along with their failing to comply with the PRM-TSI requirements, made it unlikely that they would remain in service into the 2020s without further costly refurbishment. Ultimately this became unnecessary, as the continuing introduction of new Class 385 units created sufficient spare capacity in the PRM-compliant Class 318, 320, and 380 fleets to support withdrawal of the Class 314 fleet.

ScotRail announced in May 2019 that Class 314 units would begin to be replaced by Class 385s on the Inverclyde Line that same month, leaving only three services—all early on weekday mornings—to be operated by 314s. Further withdrawals occurred throughout 2019, and the final Class 314 passenger service was worked from Paisley Canal to Glasgow Central by 314216 on 14 December 2019.

ScotRail held a farewell tour for the class on 18 December 2019, with units 314202 and 314205 operating a special service around the ScotRail network, running to Ayr, Carstairs, Cumbernauld, and Helensburgh. The tour raised funds for ScotRail's charity partner MND Scotland. In the following year, all but one of the withdrawn units were scrapped.

== Hydrogen conversion ==
In February 2020, ScotRail announced plans to convert the remaining unit, 314209, to be powered by on-board hydrogen fuel cells. The initiative is intended to study the feasibility of using hydrogen to fuel trains, as part of ScotRail's commitment to end its use of diesel fuel for traction by 2035. The project was initially handled primarily by a workgroup at the University of St Andrews, before a request for tenders was issued in September 2020 seeking a commercial partner for the full design, installation, and demonstration of a hydrogen fuel system using the Class 314 unit. In December 2020 the unit was moved to the Bo'ness and Kinneil Railway, near Falkirk, for conversion work to begin.

The lead contractor for the conversion work was rolling stock refurbishment firm Brodie Engineering, with Arcola Energy acting as hydrogen energy specialists. Arcola's A-Drive fuel cell powertrain forms the core of the new traction system, with hydrogen tanks and battery modules installed underneath all three vehicles. The increased weight of the new components was carefully measured and controlled in order to avoid exceeding the unit's maximum permissible axle load and to reduce the likelihood of the unit's kinematic envelope increasing; it was partially offset by replacing the original traction motors with new alternating current models. The intent is for the demonstrator to remain reasonably similar to a "standard" Class 314 unit, so that it can be run under its existing certificates of conformity for the general railway network.

In September 2020, it was announced that the demonstrator would appear at the COP26 Climate Change Summit, to be held in Glasgow during November 2021. The unit was to operate special services for the benefit of visiting delegates. In advance of the summit the unit was reclassified into the alternative-fuels class number range and renumbered 614209.

An acknowledged limitation of the Class 614 demonstrator is that it can only carry 80 kg (180 lb) of hydrogen, pressurised at 350 bar (5,100 psi). This is sufficient for short-distance operation as a prototype, but storage capacity will need to be significantly increased for normal passenger service to be feasible. The project team claim that it will be possible to achieve this increase by installing additional storage tanks within the vehicles – a necessity as the UK's standard loading gauge does not allow enough space for roof-mounted tanks.

== Accidents and incidents ==
- On 21 July 1991, unit 314203 was damaged in the Newton rail accident. The leading DMSO vehicle was destroyed, but later replaced with the BDMSO vehicle from written-off Class 507 unit 507022. (Note: The destroyed DMSO was vehicle number 64588, and the replacement vehicle from 507022—originally number 64426—was renumbered to match that which it was replacing.) The repaired unit re-entered service in May 1996.
- On 12 December 1994, units 314208 and 314212 were severely damaged when they were caught in floodwaters in the low-level platforms at Glasgow Central. Extremely heavy rain had caused the River Kelvin to overflow its banks near the former Kelvinbridge railway station, from which the floodwaters flowed into the disused Kelvingrove and St Vincent Crescent tunnels of the Glasgow Central Railway and thence into the active Argyle Line tunnels near Exhibition Centre. Both units were later returned to service, but the Argyle Line through Glasgow Central remained closed for ten months whilst under repair.

== Named units ==
Unit 314203 was named European Union.
