= British Rail Class 380 =

British electric multiple unit trains operating in Scotland

British Rail Class 380 Desiro
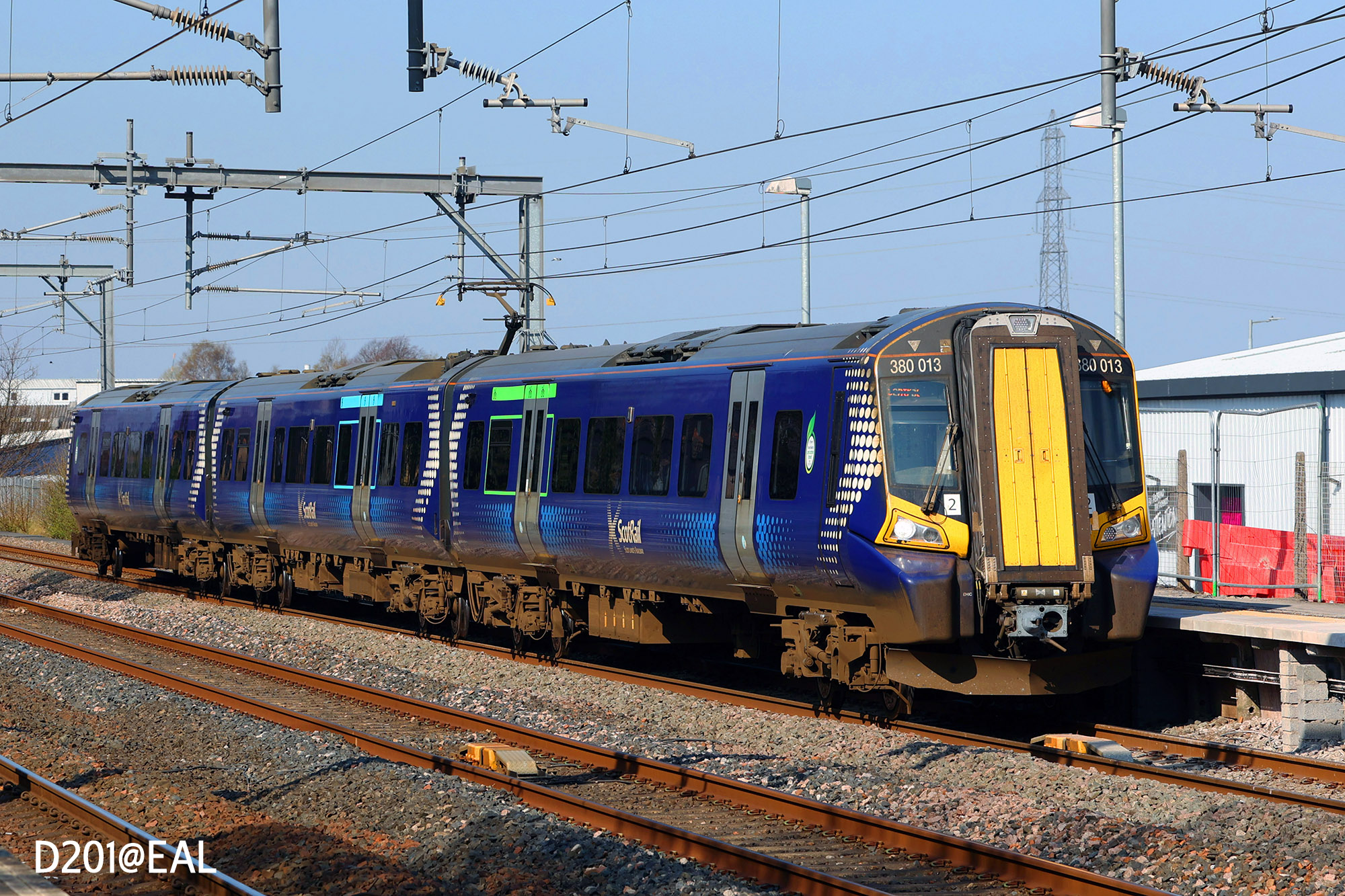
- ScotRail Class 380/0 in 2025

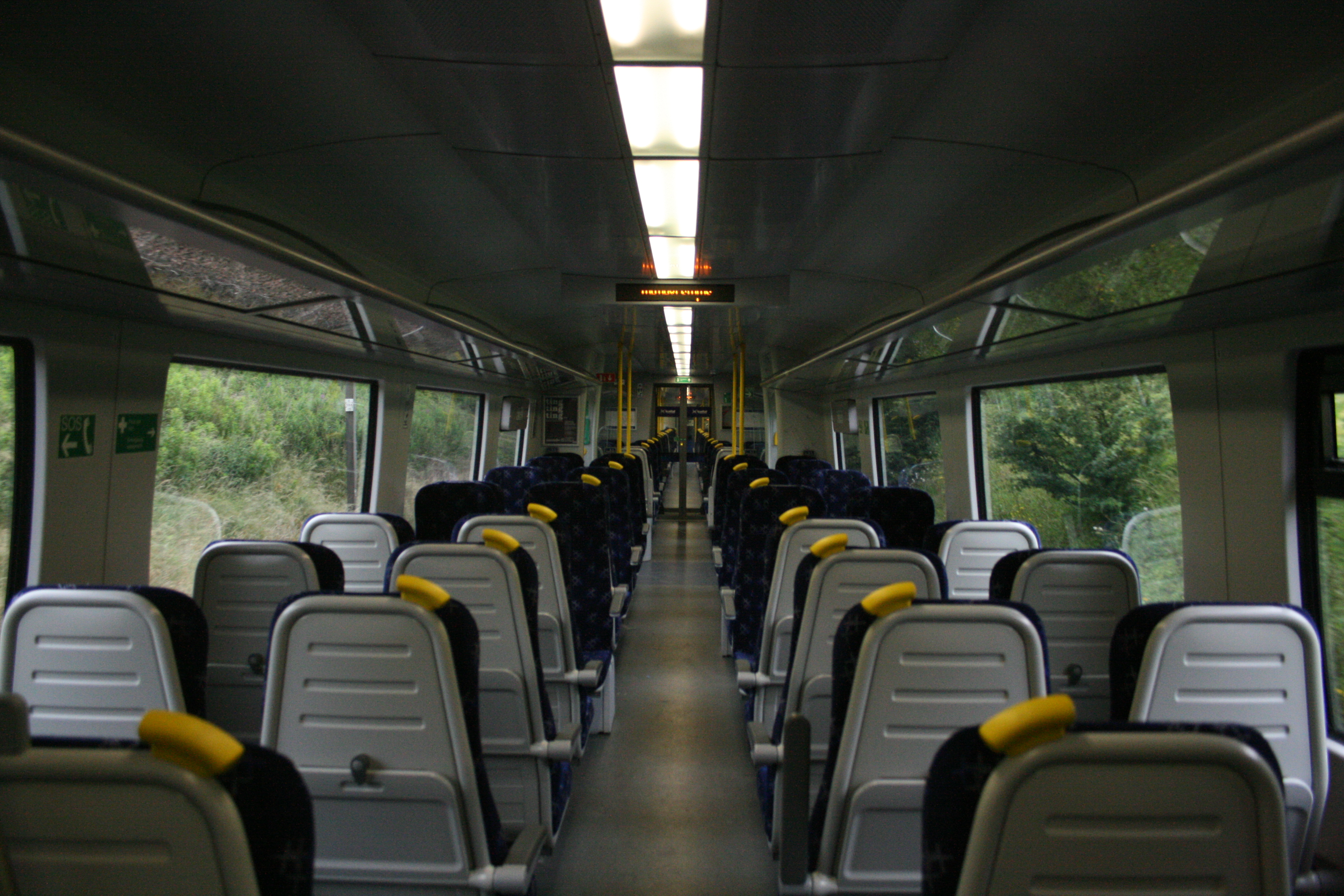
- Class 380 passenger saloon
- In service: 8 December 2010–present
- Manufacturer: Siemens Mobility
- Built at: Krefeld, Germany
- Family name: Desiro
- Replaced: Class 156; Class 314; Class 318; Class 322; Class 334
- Constructed: 2009–2011
- Number built: 22 × 380/0; 16 × 380/1
- Formation: 3 cars per 380/0 unit: DMSO(A)-PTSO-DMSO(B); 4 cars per 380/1 unit: DMSO(A)-PTSO-TSO-DMSO(B)
- Diagram: DMSO(A) vehicles: EQ201; PTSO vehicles: EK226; TSO vehicles: EK227; DMSO(B) vehicles: EQ202
- Fleet numbers: 380/0: 380001–380022; 380/1: 380101–380116
- Capacity: 380/0: 191 seats; 380/1: 265 seats
- Owner: Eversholt Rail Group
- Operator: ScotRail
- Depot: Shields Road (Glasgow)
- Lines served: Ayrshire Coast Line; Inverclyde Line; Cathcart Circle Lines; Paisley Canal Line; Glasgow South Western Line (Glasgow to Barrhead/East Kilbride sections)

Specifications
- Car body construction: Welded aluminium with steel ends
- Train length: 380/0: 71.13 m (233 ft 4 in); 380/1: 94.70 m (310 ft 8 in)
- Car length: DMSO: 23.78 m (78 ft 0 in); P/TSO: 23.57 m (77 ft 4 in)
- Width: 2.80 m (9 ft 2 in)
- Height: 3.78 m (12 ft 5 in)
- Doors: Double-leaf sliding plug (2 per side per car)
- Wheelbase: Bogies: 2.600 m (8 ft 6.4 in)
- Maximum speed: 100 mph (161 km/h)
- Weight: DMSO(A): 45.1 t (44.4 LT; 49.7 ST); PTSO: 42.4 t (41.7 LT; 46.7 ST); TSO: 34.7 t (34.2 LT; 38.3 ST); DMSO(B): 45.3 t (44.6 LT; 49.9 ST); 380/0 total: 132.8 t (130.7 LT; 146.4 ST); 380/1 total: 167.5 t (164.9 LT; 184.6 ST)
- Power output: 2,000 kW (2,682 hp)
- Acceleration: 380/0: max. 1.0 m/s^{2} (2.2 mph/s); 380/1: max. 0.9 m/s^{2} (2.0 mph/s)
- Electric system: 25 kV 50 Hz AC overhead
- Current collection: Pantograph
- UIC classification: 380/0: Bo′Bo′+2′2′+Bo′Bo′; 380/1: Bo′Bo′+2′2′+2′2′+Bo′Bo′
- Bogies: Siemens SGP SF5000
- Minimum turning radius: 120 m (394 ft)
- Braking system: Electro-Pneumatic (disc)
- Safety systems: AWS; TPWS
- Coupling system: Voith 12
- Multiple working: Within class
- Track gauge: 1,435 mm (4 ft 8 1/2 in) standard gauge

Notes/references
- Sourced from unless otherwise noted.

The British Rail Class 380 Desiro is a type of electric multiple unit passenger train that operates on the National Rail network in Scotland, for ScotRail on various routes out of Glasgow Central. The three- and four-carriage trains were built in Germany by Siemens Mobility and entered into service in 2010.

== History ==
Class 380/1 at Glasgow Central

The trains operate ScotRail services in the Ayrshire and Inverclyde regions of Scotland and had originally been intended for the cancelled Glasgow Airport Rail Link.

The contract was awarded to Siemens Mobility and announced by Transport Scotland on 11 July 2008. A total of 38 units were ordered, comprising 22 three-car and 16 four-car units. All 38 units are owned by Eversholt Rail, a rolling stock company (ROSCO) that leases them to ScotRail.

Stations along the Ayrshire Coast Line and Inverclyde Line underwent platform extension works to allow the use of the longer trains. The trains were specified to have full access for disabled people and to have streamlined end corridor connections. On the unveiling of the first completed vehicle, it was announced that the fleet would be divided into two sub-groups, with the three-car units Class 380/0 and the four-car as Class 380/1. The first unit to be delivered arrived in the UK in August 2010.

In September 2010, commissioning of the fleet was suspended by ScotRail due to technical issues with the trains. The reliability issues and extended commissioning period resulted in an initially reduced service on parts of the ScotRail network, including the newly re-opened Airdrie-Bathgate line.

The fleet is based at Glasgow Shields Road TMD. Introduction of the fleet resulted in the cascading of the Class 334 "Juniper" and Class 318 fleet which previously operated the Ayrshire Coast Line and Inverclyde Line. The fleet also allowed the Class 322 fleet that operated on the North Berwick Line to be withdrawn and transferred to Northern Rail. The Class 334 "Juniper" units were cascaded onto the North Clyde Line, and the Class 318s were cascaded onto the Argyle Line.

== Operations ==
As of 2026, the Class 380 operates trains between Glasgow Central and Ayr, Largs, Ardrossan, Gourock, Wemyss Bay, Neilston, Newton, Barrhead, East Kilbride and Cathcart Circle. In addition, they also operated trains between Edinburgh and Glasgow Queen Street via Falkirk Grahamston, North Berwick and Dunbar for a time whilst awaiting the Class 385 introduction to service.

The fleet was introduced into public service in December 2010.

In November 2012, the Class 380 started operating services on the Paisley Canal Line following the line's electrification.

Following the December 2014 timetable change, with the electrification of the Whifflet Line, services to Lanark were re-routed into Glasgow Central High Level. Alongside the usual Class 318 and Class 320 units, the Class 380 has been used on the route.

The Class 380 operated some services on the electrified line between Glasgow Queen Street and Edinburgh Waverley via Falkirk from December 2017, due to the late arrival of the Class 385 units.

From December 2023, Class 380 trains began operating on the Glasgow South Western Line from Glasgow Central to Barrhead following electrification of the route.

== Fleet details ==
Subclass	Operator	Qty.	Year built	Cars per unit	Unit nos.
380/0	ScotRail	22	2009–2011	3	380001–380022
380/1	ScotRail	16	2009–2011	4	380101–380116
