= Slam-door train =

Trains which have manually operated doors

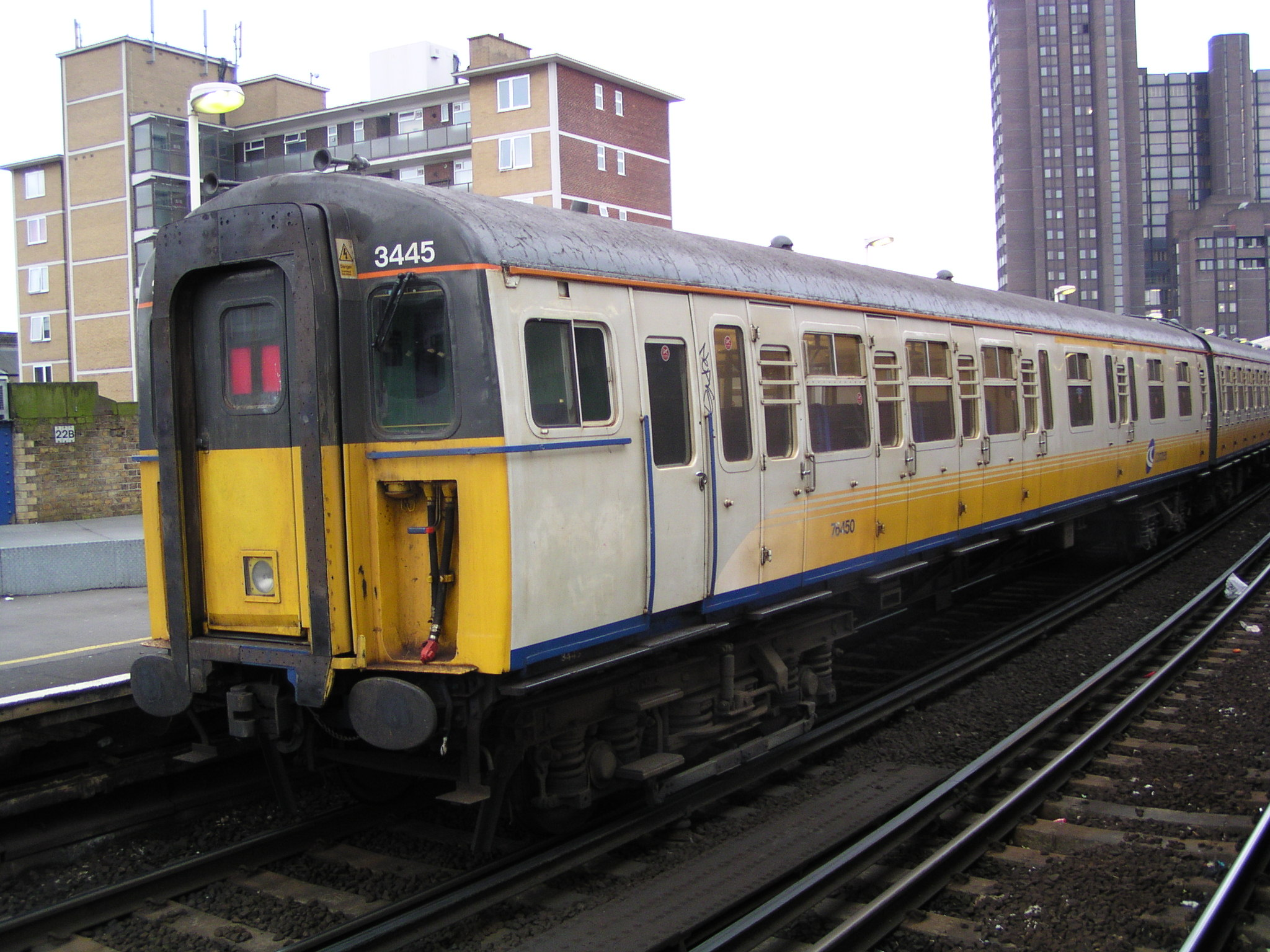
Connex South Eastern Class 423 at Waterloo East in February 2003

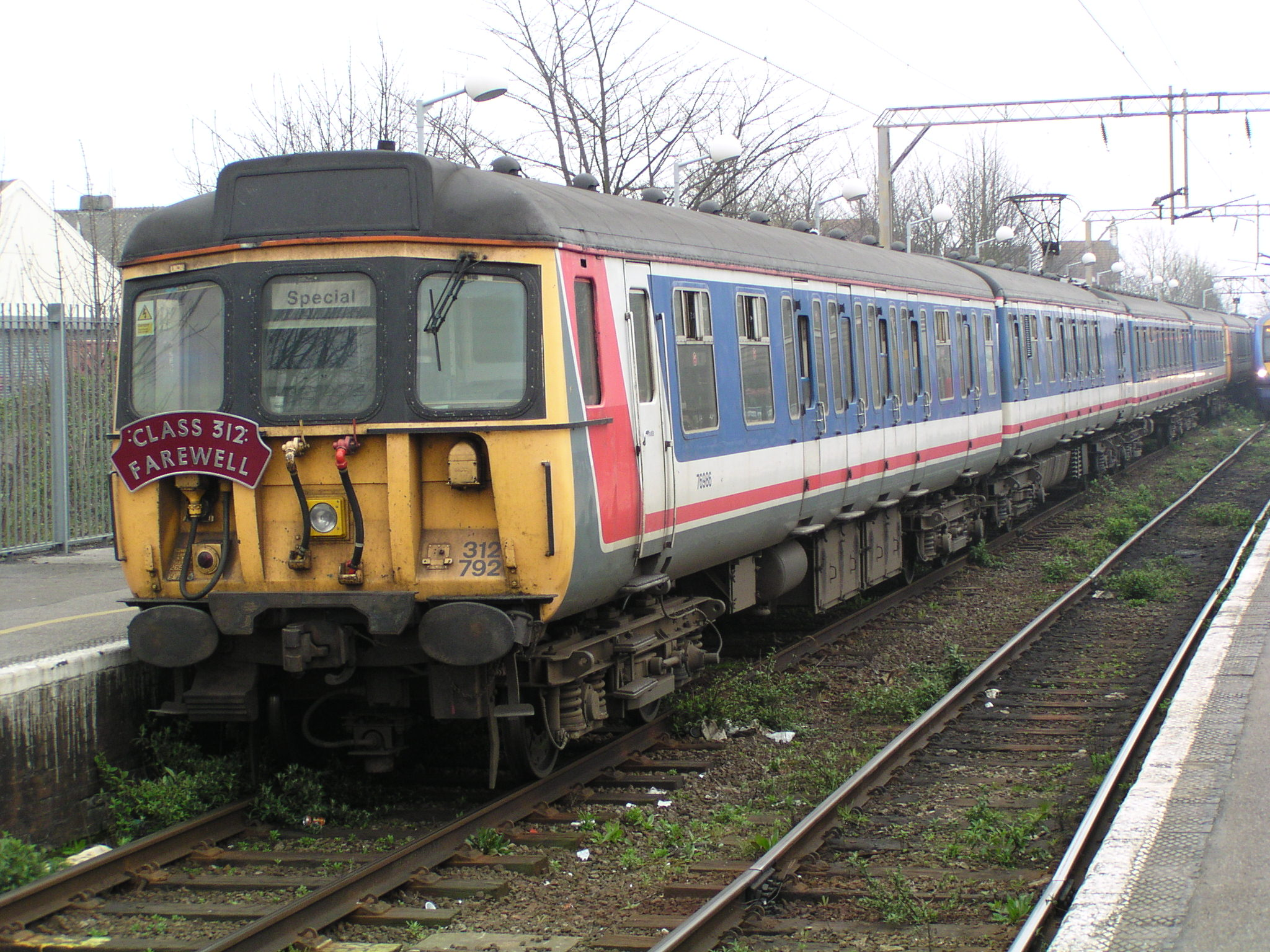
c2c Class 312 at Shoeburyness in March 2003

A slam-door train or slammer is a set of railway coaches, a diesel multiple unit (DMU) or electric multiple unit (EMU) that were designed before the introduction of automatic doors on railway carriages in the United Kingdom and other countries, which feature manually operated doors. The name is due to the characteristic 'slam' noise made by the doors when closed quickly.

Some slam-door train designs featured doors that could only be opened from the outside, so passengers had to lean out of the window to reach the outside door handle. Slam-door trains often had many more doors than newer trains; some designs featured a door for every individual seating bay; some units had individual compartment doors.

The term "slam-door train" is more commonly applied to Mark 1 and Mark 2 DMUs and EMUs, though may refer to locomotive-hauled trains featuring the same door design.

== History ==
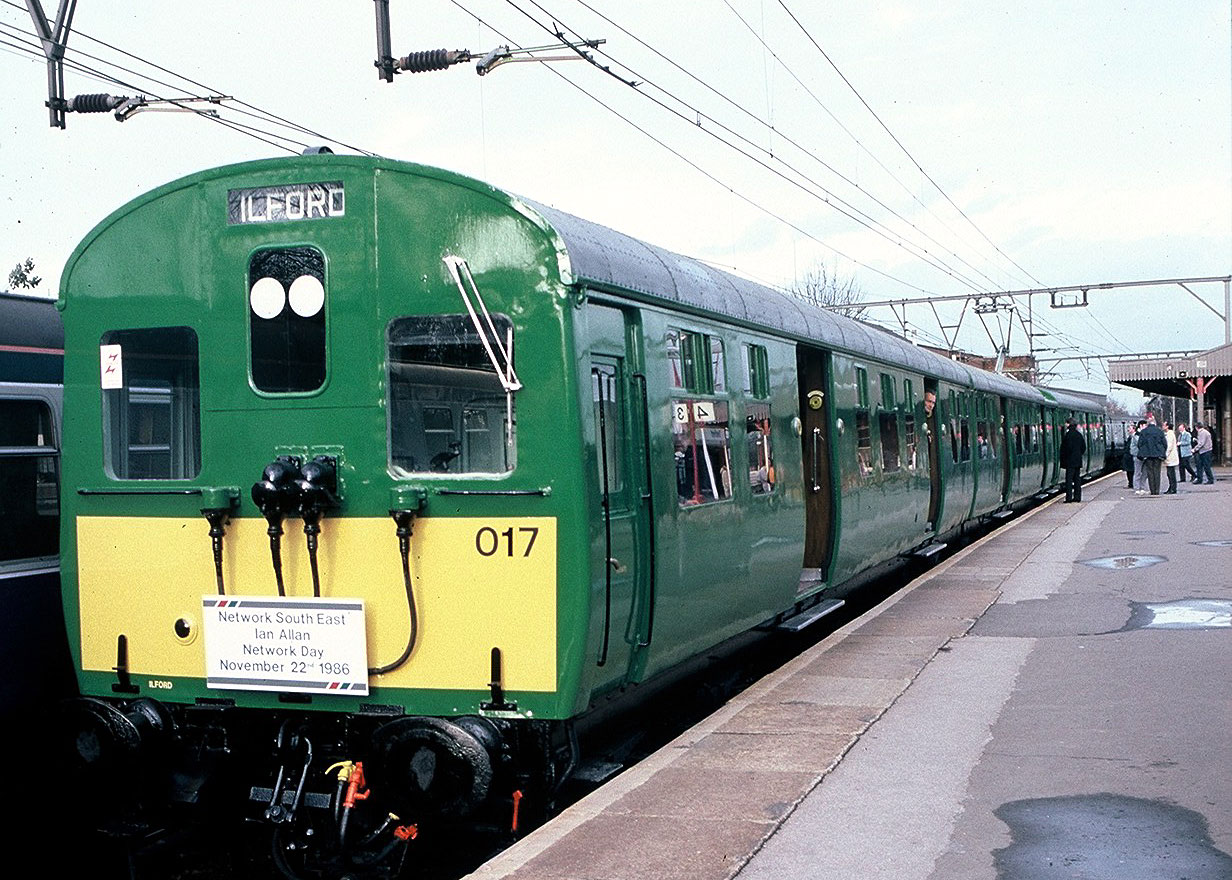
Class 306 at Shenfield in November 1986

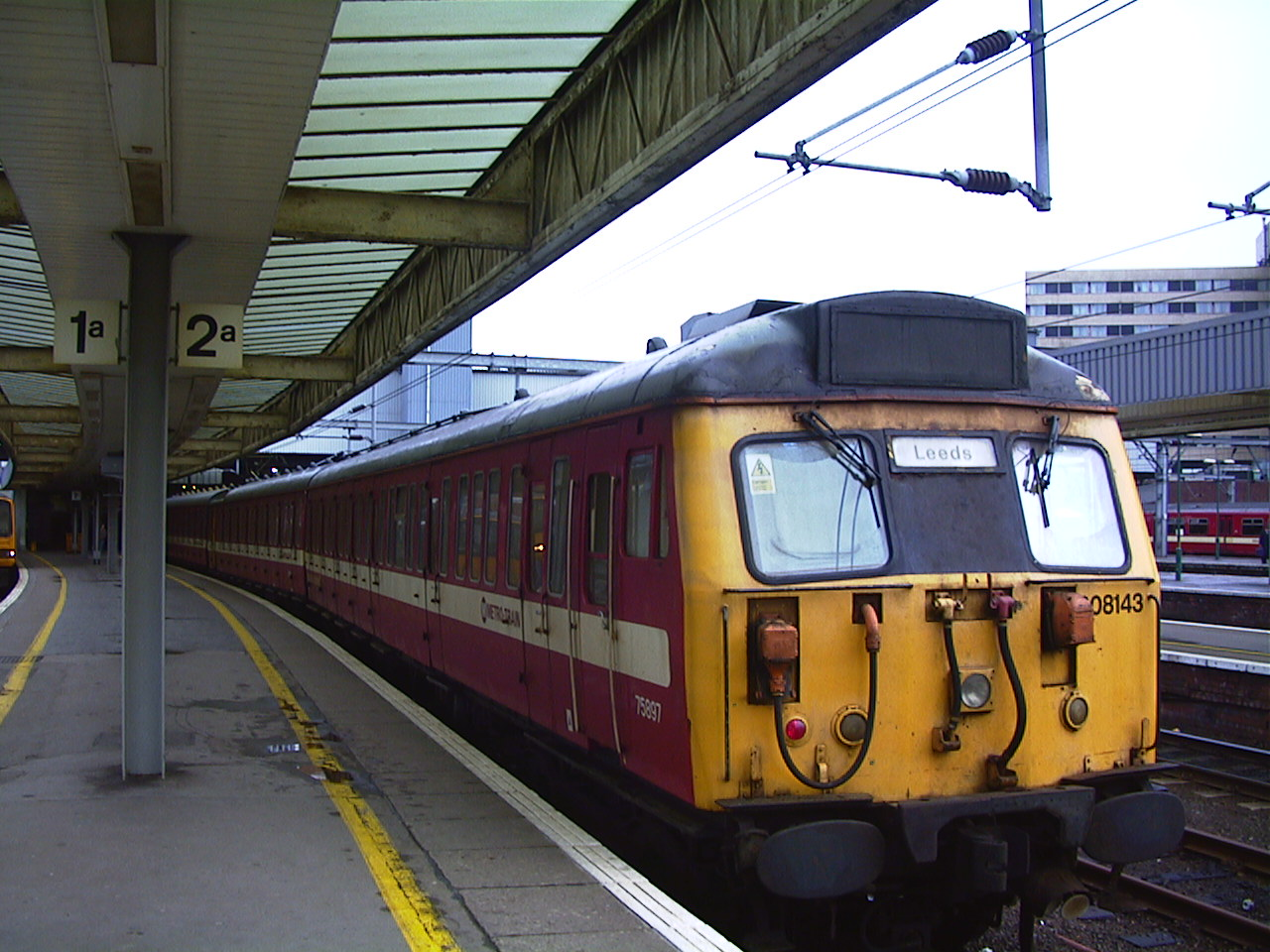
Northern Spirit Class 308 at Leeds in September 1998

Slam-door EMU and DMU trains were commonplace ever since the introduction of electrification. While there were early examples of the type, which are beyond the scope of this example, they became commonplace on the Southern Railway in the 1930s when it electrified its main routes around the south of London at 750 V DC (third rail), in particular, the line to Brighton.

Slam-door diesel multiple units became common in the 1950s when British Railways (BR) sought to modernise its network and replace steam locomotives. Many one, two and three coach units were built for non-electrified lines all around the country, in particular, these were popular on branch lines where it was uneconomic to electrify. These units were later classified in the Class 101 – 129 series, dependent on the design.

Meanwhile, large new fleets of electric slam-door trains were being built for use around the country. AC units were built for the newly electrified routes out of London Liverpool Street to Southend-on-Sea, Colchester and Clacton; also for some routes around Manchester. These AC units were later classified as Class 302 through to Class 312, again dependent on the design. AC units for Glasgow, however (classes 303 and 311) had power operated sliding doors, as had the Class 306 on the Great Eastern.

In the Southern region, the early units were replaced in the 1950s and 1960s with new slam-door third-rail electric units, first of all the compartment commuter units 4-SUB and 4-EPB and later the much more comfortable longer distance trains which survived in use until the early years of the 21st century. These included the 4-CIG, 4-CEP and 4-VEPs; the former two being fairly similar while the latter was designed with more crowded seats and more doors to enable faster unloading and loading of passengers.

Finally, also on the Southern division, new slam-door diesel multiple units were introduced in the late 1950s, these were classified as Class 201 and similar and were affectionately named 'Thumpers' due to the distinctive noise made by the engines.

== Demise ==
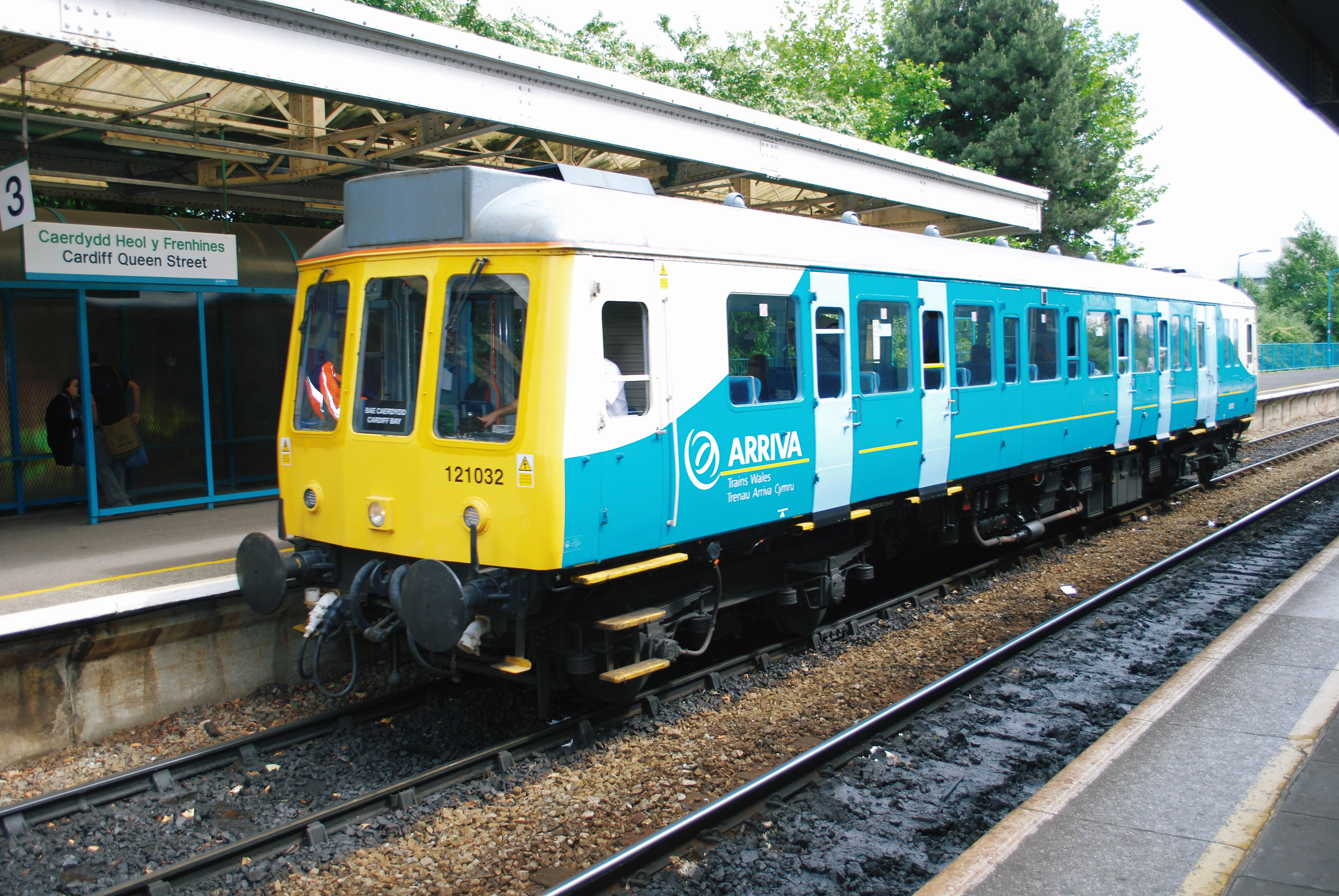
Arriva Trains Wales Class 121 at Cardiff Queen Street in June 2009

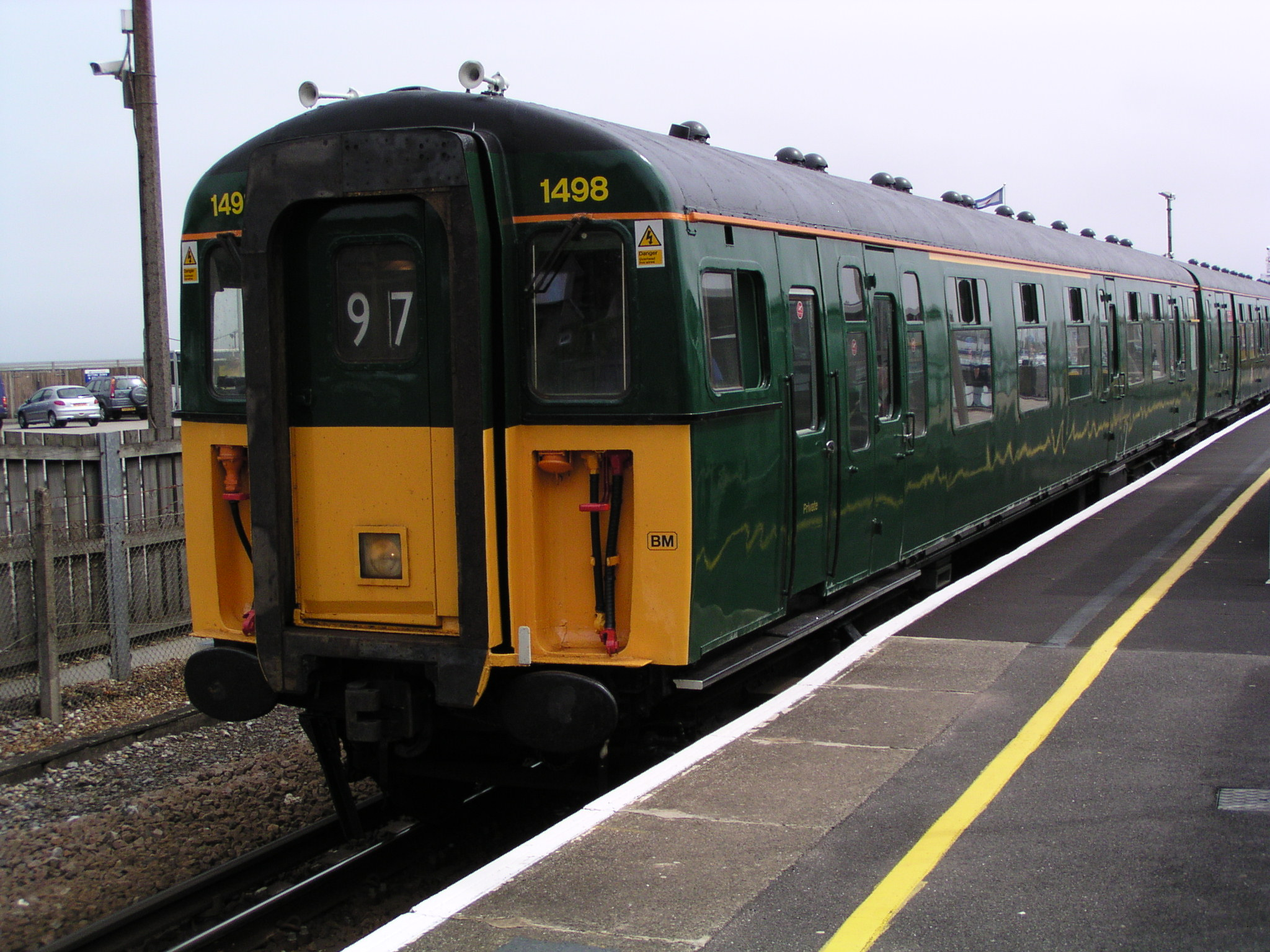
South West Trains Class 421 at Lymington Pier.

In the UK, slam-door trains had a long service life, but were gradually replaced by newer units with automatic doors. These newer units are safer as the doors have central locking. This has now been fitted to surviving public rail line units. In the past, the doors on slam-door trains could be opened at any time, even while the train was moving.

Sliding doors were first introduced on the London Underground in the 1920s, and by the 1930s, main line railway companies had already introduced a limited number of sliding door electric multiple unit classes, most notably the LMS and its Class 502 and Class 503 on Merseyside as early as 1938, and the LNER and its Class 306 on the Great Eastern Main Line and almost identical Class 506 on the Manchester to Glossop Line soon after World War II ended. The Scottish region saw its first main line sliding door trains in the 1960s with the introduction of the Class 303 and Class 311s.

But it wasn't until the advent of the experimental Class 445 "PEP" stock in 1972 and its production derivatives such as the Class 313 AC/DC EMUs in the late 1970s that saw the beginning of the end for the slam door trains. The very similar 1980s-vintage Class 455 trains around London displaced the 4-EPBs while introduction of the 5-WES Class 442 Wessex Electrics in 1988 and electrification of the line to Weymouth saw the end of yet more slam-door trains. At the same time, BR had introduced a new type of DMU, the Class 150 Sprinter. The final build of slam-door stock were the Class 312s in the mid-1970s.

The development of a new generation of multiple units in the early 2000s enabled the now-privatised train operators to finally replace the slam-door trains (which were over 40 years old in some cases) with modern, new units. These included Alstom Coradia and Bombardier Turbostar DMUs and Bombardier Electrostar and Siemens Desiro EMUs.

Due to a number of high-profile accidents in the 1990s, the manually locked slam doors were supplemented with electronic, driver- or guard-operated central locking before they were gradually phased out in favour of sliding doors through the 2000s, resulting in a sharp decline in the number of deaths per year from passengers falling from trains. The last slam-door stock was withdrawn by South Eastern Trains in December 2005.

Single-coach Class 121s were reintroduced by Arriva Trains Wales and Chiltern Railways to operate services from Cardiff Bay to Cardiff Queen Street and Aylesbury to Princes Risborough respectively. These were withdrawn in 2013 and 2017.

== Preservation ==
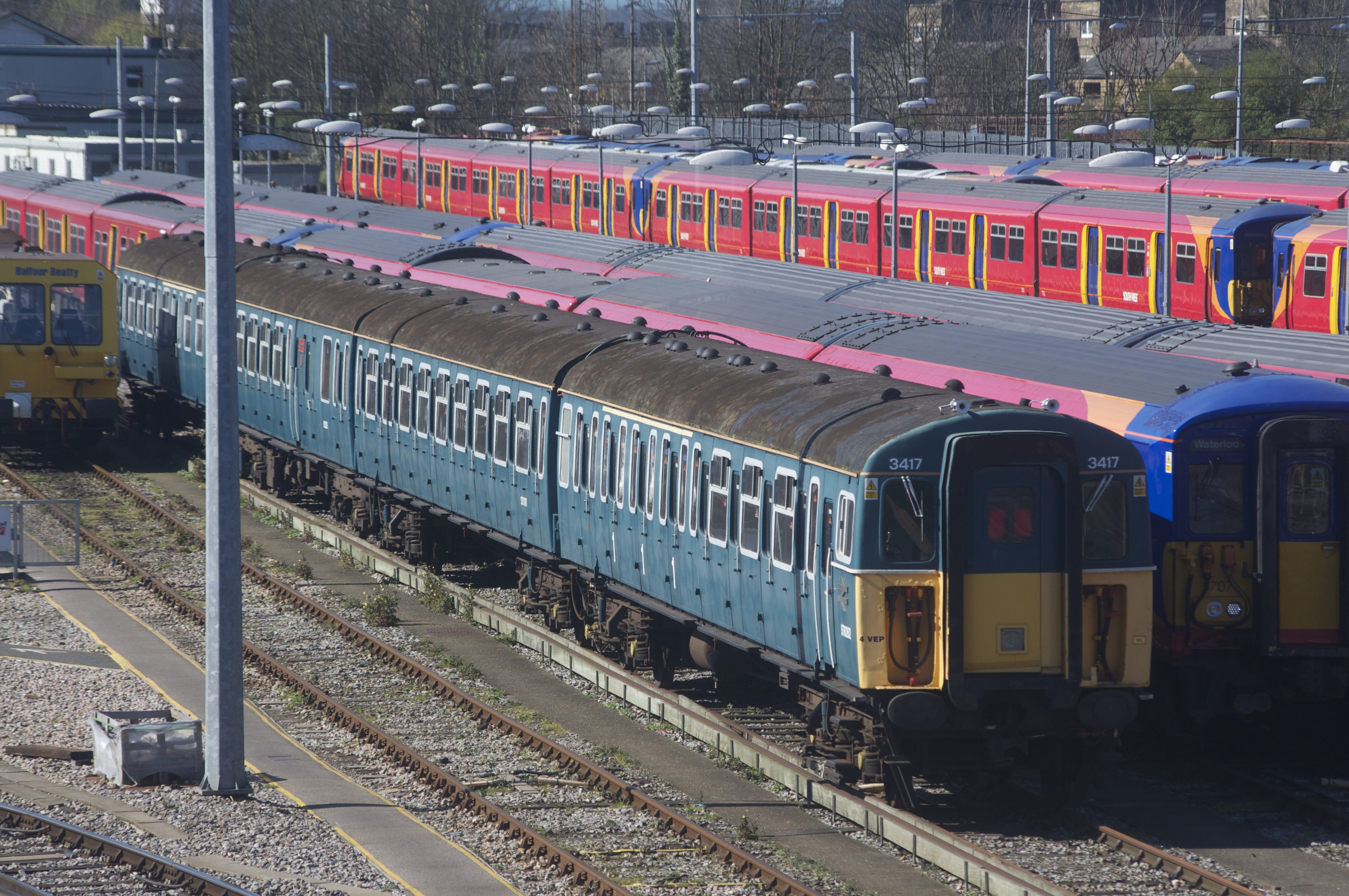
Preserved Class 423 at Clapham Junction in March 2014

The last units were withdrawn from the mainline railway network in November 2005, and South West Trains ran slam-door trains on the Lymington branch line in Hampshire until 22 May 2010. It had taken two '3-CIG' (Class 421) units and installed central locking and ran the service as a 'heritage line'.

South West Trains has also retained a complete 4-VEP (Class 423) unit which is in storage. Other examples of slam door trains are held by various museums and private groups, however there are no remaining examples of some types of the units, with the AC electric units having fared particularly badly. Slam-door electric trains are generally unattractive to preserved railways as they are unable to run under their own power while diesel units remain in service on many preserved railways around the UK.

Another problem is that many slam-door trains contain asbestos. This was removed from some during refurbishments in the 1980s, but many slam-door trains have been incinerated to destroy the asbestos. Those that remain must have their asbestos removed by anyone that wishes to purchase them, which is a specialist, expensive process that also damages the units.
