= British Rail Class 320 =

British EMU passenger train

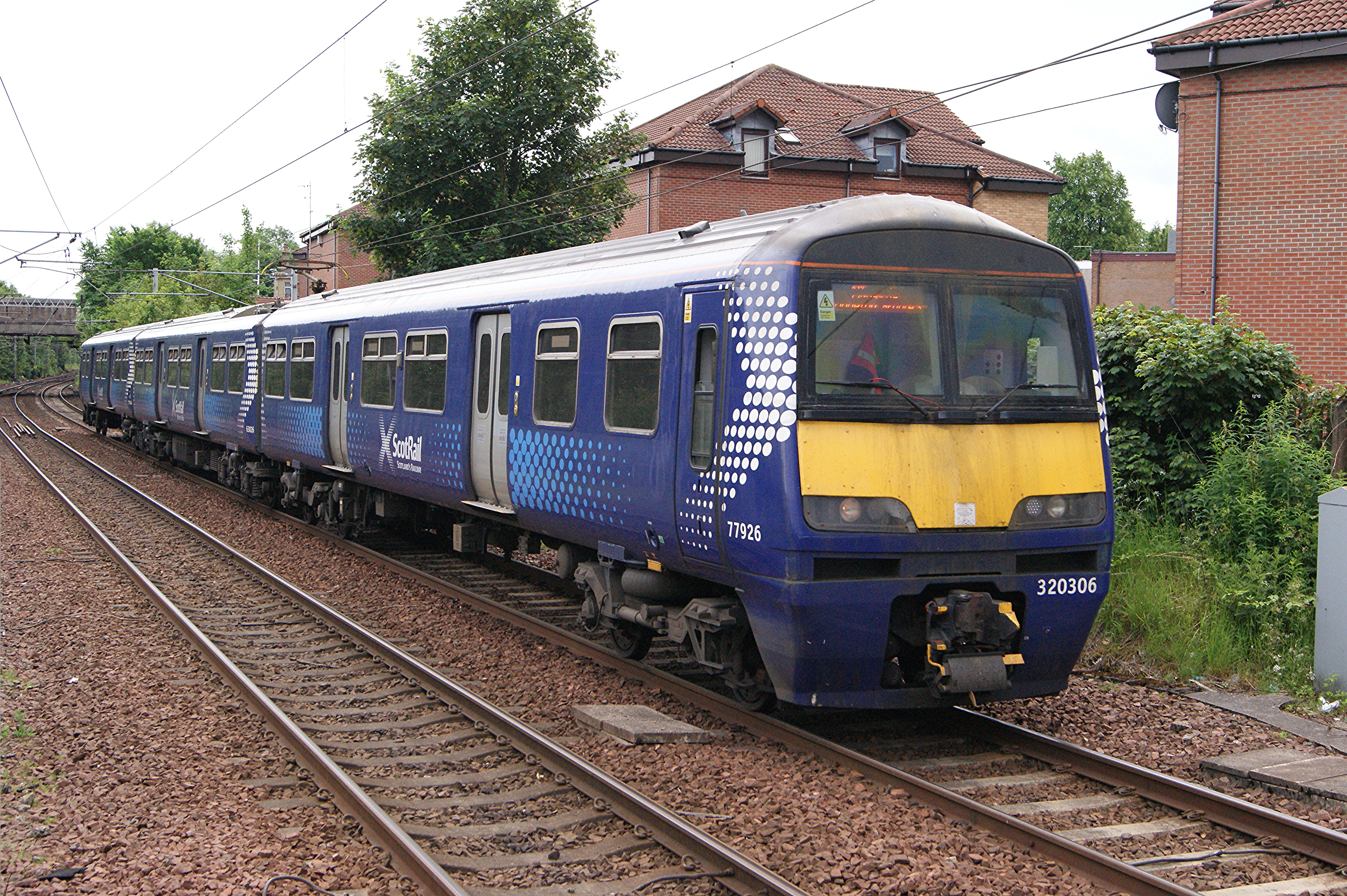
- Abellio ScotRail Class 320 approaching Whifflet in 2015

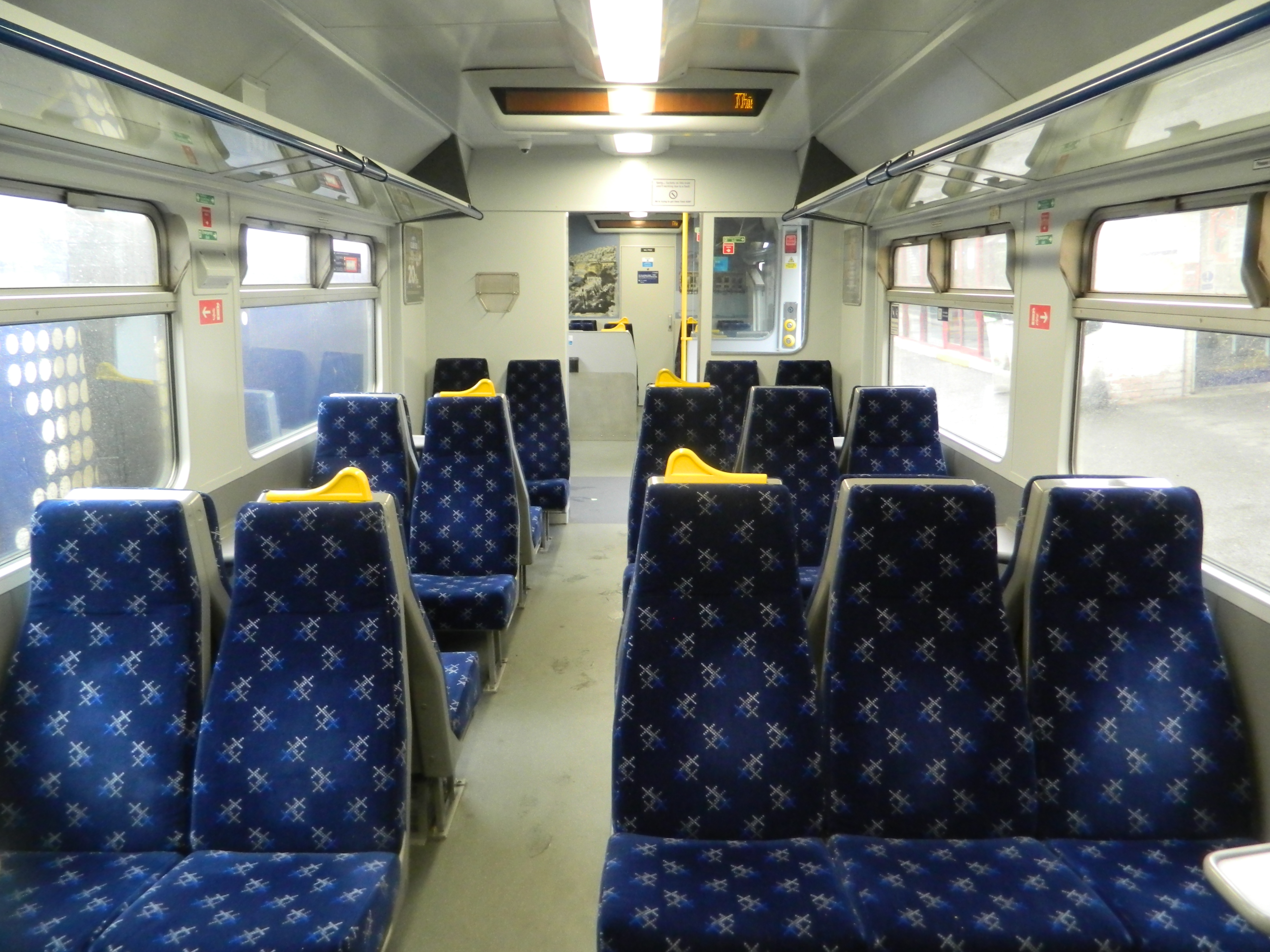
- Refurbished Abellio ScotRail Class 320/3 saloon
- In service: August 1990 – present
- Manufacturer: British Rail Engineering Limited
- Order no.: 31060–31062
- Built at: Holgate Road Works, York
- Family name: BR Second Generation (Mark 3)
- Replaced: Class 303; Class 311
- Constructed: 1990
- Number built: 34 (inc. 12 converted from Class 321/4)
- Formation: 3 cars per unit: DTSO-MSO-DTSO
- Fleet numbers: 320/3: 320301–320322; 320/4: 320401, 320403, 320404, 320411–320418, 320420
- Owner: Eversholt Rail Group
- Operator: ScotRail
- Depot: Shields Road (Glasgow)

Specifications
- Car body construction: Steel
- Car length: DTS vehs.: 19.950 m (65 ft 5.4 in); MS vehs.: 19.920 m (65 ft 4.3 in)
- Width: 2.816 m (9 ft 2.9 in)
- Height: 3.775 m (12 ft 4.6 in)
- Doors: Double-leaf sliding pocket, each 1.200 m (3 ft 11.2 in) wide (2 per side per car)
- Wheelbase: Over bogie centres: 14.170 m (46 ft 5.9 in)
- Maximum speed: 320/3: 90 mph (145 km/h); 320/4: 100 mph (160 km/h)
- Weight: Total: 114.5 tonnes (112.7 long tons; 126.2 short tons)
- Traction motors: 4 × Brush TM21-41B
- Power output: 990 kW (1,328 hp)
- Acceleration: 0.55 m/s^{2} (1.2 mph/s) max.
- Electric system: Overhead line, 25 kV 50 Hz AC
- Current collection: Pantograph
- UIC classification: 2′2′+Bo′Bo′+2′2′
- Bogies: Powered: BREL P7-4; Unpowered: BREL T3-7
- Minimum turning radius: 71 m (232 ft 11 in)
- Braking system: Electro-pneumatic (disc)
- Safety systems: AWS; TPWS
- Coupling system: Tightlock
- Multiple working: Within class, and with Class 318
- Track gauge: 1,435 mm (4 ft 8 1/2 in) standard gauge

The British Rail Class 320 is an electric multiple unit (EMU) passenger train found on the Strathclyde rail network in Central Scotland. They are mainly used on the North Clyde Line and the Argyle Line, but they can also be seen on Glasgow Central to Lanark, Cathcart Circle, Paisley Canal Line and Inverclyde Line services. The Class 320 uses Overhead line, 25 kV 50 Hz AC electrification.

== Details ==
The Class 320 is effectively a three-car derivative of the Class 321 units found in and around London, East Anglia and Yorkshire. Built in 1990 by British Rail Engineering Limited's Holgate Road carriage works, York, 22 three-car sets were ordered by SPT to replace the unrefurbished members of the Class 303 which were by then 30 years old, and all Class 311 units. The trains were built against order numbers 31060–31062, which were issued on 6 January 1989 and completed on 31 October 1990.

The units run on 25 kV 50 Hz AC overhead line supply via a Brecknell Willis high speed pantograph, using four Brush TM2141B traction motors. With much shorter passenger journeys in mind, the Class 320 units originally lacked the toilets of the Class 321 units and also began life with a lower speed capability (75 mph or 120 km/h) due to the much closer spacing of stations on the North Clyde Line. The lower design speed meant that yaw dampers could be omitted from the class. However, yaw dampers were fitted across the class in 2010, allowing them to run at 90 mph (145 km/h). This meant that the units could be used on the sections of the Argyle Line route shared with the West Coast Main Line (and in theory, the Airdrie-Bathgate extension of the North Clyde Line and beyond, although this is currently prevented by a lack of DOO equipment) and also allows full-speed running in multiple with the near similar Class 318. Their interior design includes paintings of various landmarks and famous sights along the various SPT rail routes on the car ends.

The Class 320 units are fitted with GSM-R cab radios and took part in the GSM-R trial in the Strathclyde area.

== Operations ==
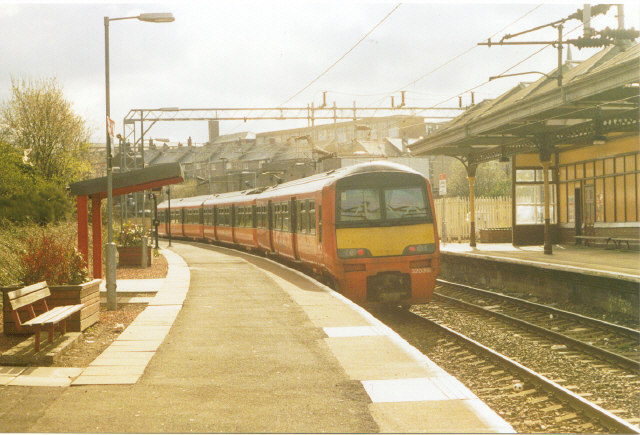
A Class 320 in its original livery at Coatbridge Sunnyside in 1994

The units were originally intended to operate on the Argyle Line but, mainly because the platform monitors on the Argyle Line stations did not line up with the driver cabs, the units were initially restricted to the North Clyde Line, although they were occasionally used for VIP trips from the high-level platforms of Glasgow Central when they were the newest EMU stock in the SPT fleet. The problem was resolved in 2011 and the units began entering service to replace the final Class 334 units on the Argyle Line. From December 2016, Class 320s started to operate on the Cathcart/Newton lines from Glasgow Central High Level to replace a number of Class 314 units that were transferred to the Inverclyde Line.

Like all SPT rolling stock of the period, the Class 320 was painted in the orange/black livery until 1997, when the carmine/cream livery was progressively phased in.

In September 2008 the Scottish Government's agency Transport Scotland announced that all ScotRail trains would eventually be repainted in a new, blue livery with white Saltire markings on the carriage ends. Relivery of the fleet began in February 2011 when the units were taken for their refurbishment.

== Cascade and refurbishment ==
Between 2002 and 2004, the Class 320 fleet was given an interior refurbishment, with new seat covers and flooring vinyl, improved interior lighting and electronic and audible destination information systems installed. The units were also given a revised SPT carmine and cream livery, the most noticeable difference being the passenger doors were all cream.

In 2011, the Class 320 started to be used in the Argyle Line alongside the Class 318, as well as operating on the North Clyde Line alongside the Class 334. Although possible, as of 2024 they have not been diagrammed to operate east of Airdrie.

All Class 320 units were refurbished again by Wabtec Doncaster between February 2011 and October 2013. The refurbishment work included:

- Internal refurbishment, including the fitting of toilets.
- Underframe work, bogie change/buckeye renewal.
- Relivery into ScotRail Saltire livery.

The first unit to be completed was 320314, which headed south to Wabtec Doncaster on 14 February 2011 and returned on 6 June 2011. The final unit to be sent for refurbishment was 320310, which headed south on 30 August 2013 and returned on 4 October 2013.

A third refurbishment programme took place between 2017 and 2019, focusing on the interior. This included an interior repaint, the replacement of vinyl flooring, retrimming of the seat covers into Saltire blue moquette and the fitting of power sockets and LED interior lighting. The work brought the Class 320/3 fleet up to the same standard as the Class 320/4 units and the refurbished Class 318.

== Accidents and incidents ==
- On 7 May 2022, a Class 320 (320309) and a Class 318 (318262) derailed between Blairhill and Coatbridge Sunnyside. The train was an empty coaching stock running from Yoker C.S to Shields TMD and was going via the North Clyde due to the Argyle line being closed. Nobody was injured during this incident.

== Class 320/4 units ==
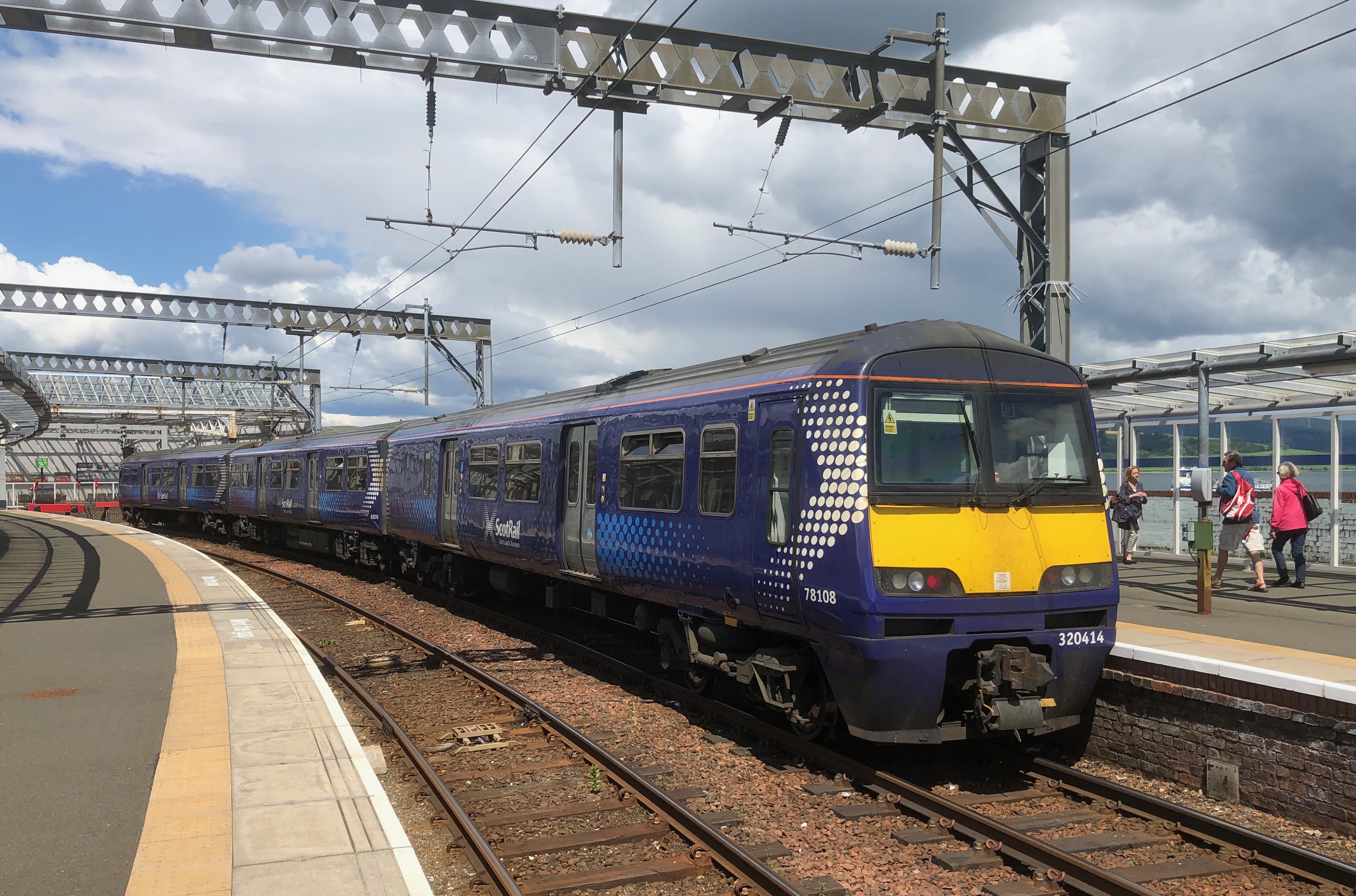
A Class 320/4 at Gourock

A fleet of seven former London Midland Class 321/4 units were converted to Class 320/4 at Doncaster Wabtec works before being transferred to ScotRail between July 2015 and October 2016. The conversion included the removal of the TSOL trailer vehicle. The first three converted units, 320411, 320412 and 320416, entered service in March 2016, initially retaining their London Midland livery. The first fully refurbished unit, 320415, entered service on 15 August 2016. The unit was painted in ScotRail Saltire livery and had received a full internal refurbishment, including an internal repaint, new floor vinyl and new blue 'saltire' seat coverings, as well as the fitting of a large accessible toilet. Subsequent converted units would be fully refurbished and the initial three units were later returned to Doncaster Wabtec works for refurbishment. The conversion and refurbishment of all seven Class 320/4 units was completed in January 2017.

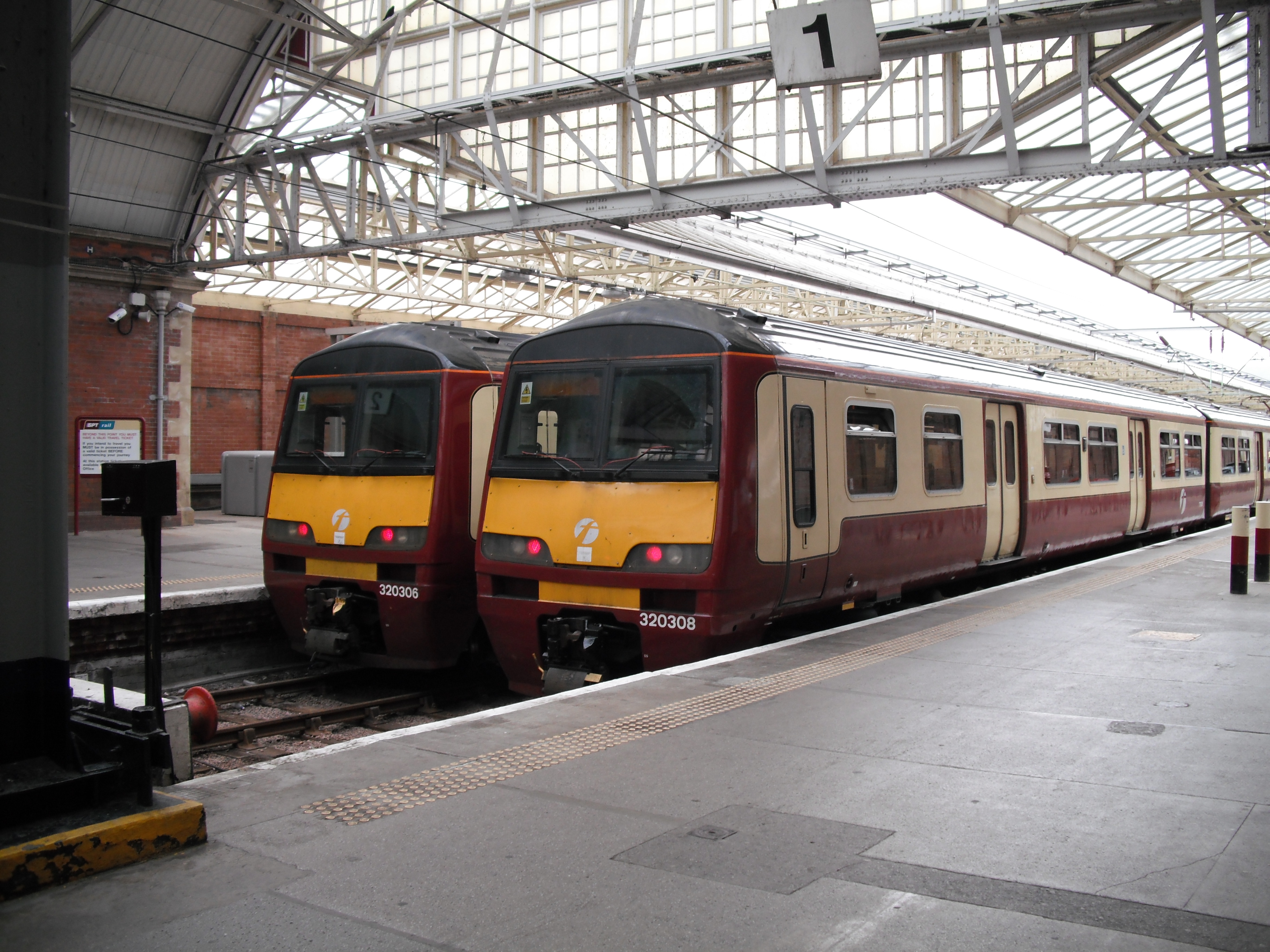
320s at Helensburgh Central in 2009

In November 2017, ScotRail received a further five Class 321/4 units, which were converted to Class 320/4 by Wabtec Rail Scotland in Kilmarnock, with entry into service planned to begin from summer 2018.

The first of the five additional units, 320404, was released from Wabtec and moved to Glasgow Shields Road TMD on 8 August 2018.

== Fleet details ==
Subclass	Operator	Qty.	Year built	Cars per unit	Unit nos.	Notes
320/3	ScotRail	22	1990	3	320301–320322	Original batch.
320/4	ScotRail	12	1989–1990	3	320401, 320403, 320404, 320411–320418, 320420	Converted from Class 321/4.

=== Vehicle numbering ===
Individual vehicles are numbered in the ranges as follows:

Ranges for Class 320/3 vehicles
DTSO(A)	MSO	DTSO(B)
77899–77920	63021–63042	77921–77942

Class 321/4 vehicles used to form Class 320/4 units retain their original numbers.

=== Named units ===
Several units received names, but all were denamed following the refurbishment between 2011 and 2013.

- 320305: Glasgow School of Art 1844-150-1994
- 320306: Model Rail Scotland
- 320308: High Road 20th Anniversary 2000
- 320309: Radio Clyde 25th Anniversary
- 320311: Royal College of Physicians and Surgeons of Glasgow
- 320312: Sir William A Smith - Founder of the Boys' Brigade
- 320321: Rt Hon John Smith QC MP
- 320322: Festive Glasgow Orchid
