= Glasgow Shields Road TMD =

Traction maintenance depot in Glasgow City, Scotland

Glasgow Shields Road ETD
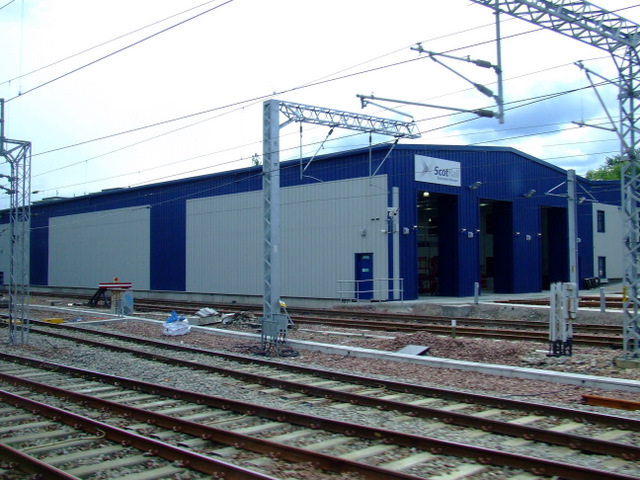
- Shields Depot as seen from the tracks
- Interactive map of Glasgow Shields Road ETD

Location
- Location: Glasgow, Scotland
- Coordinates: 55.8469°N 4.2873°W
- OS grid: NS568638

Characteristics
- Owner: Network Rail
- Depot code: GW (1975-)
- Type: Electric, EMU

History
- Opened: 1967
- Original: British Railways
- Former depot code: GS (1973-1975)

Glasgow Shields Road ETD is a railway electric traction depot in Glasgow, Scotland. The depot is located on the south side of the Glasgow Central to Paisley lines, adjacent to Shields Junction and close to the site of the former Shields Road station. The depot's code is 'GW'.

== History ==
The depot was opened in May 1967 by the Minister of Transport, the Rt. Hon. Barbara Castle MP. Initially, its purpose was to maintain the Class 303 and Class 311 rolling stock, which operated on the electrified services from Glasgow Central High Level to Gourock, Wemyss Bay, Motherwell via Rutherglen and also the Cathcart Circle and Kirkhill branches. Electrification up until this point had been confined to Cathcart Circle and Newton/Neilston branches (May 1962) and the North Suburban lines (1960), with sets being maintained at Hyndland depot which opened in 1959.

In 1974, with the extension of the West Coast Main Line electrification to Glasgow Central, AC electric locomotives would now be running the entire route from London Euston to Glasgow Central. The decision was made to maintain the locos at Shields, while the coaching stock was maintained at nearby Polmadie depot.

The original allocated locomotives were the Class 81 fleet. Visiting classes ranged from Classes 85, 86 and 87 locos, ultimately seeing the Class 90 introduced in the late 1980s.

In its original guise, the depot was capable of handling 8 × 3-car sets in four roads undercover. It had seven stabling roads. Within the depot itself, Matterson lifting jacks were used to allow the changing of wheelsets and traction motors; a wallcrane aided the removal of pantographs and other associated roof equipment from the fleet. The depot also had an underfloor wheel profiling machine, located in a separate shed in No. 7 road.

The depot was also the original home of the CM&EE electrification maintenance train and the OHL maintenance staff prior to moving to the purpose built Network Rail facility at Cowlairs.

In 1978, the depot saw its first expansion as British Rail decided to base the Class 370 Advanced Passenger Train at the depot. Part of the expansion saw the extension of the maintenance shed by fully three coach lengths to allow for the additional passenger rakes into which the APT was formed. Additional equipment was installed including a 15 tonne overhead crane, a purpose built wheel drop pit for removing the axles on the articulated bogies of the APT.

In 1985, the decision was made to scrap the APT and BR announced a consolidation of its EMU maintenance in Scotland; this led to the closure of Hyndland depot in 1987 as a maintenance facility. Furthermore, a purpose built facility was opened at Yoker, allowing the closure of Bridgeton as a stabling point.

This meant that the depot at Shields was now responsible for all EMU maintenance in the Glasgow area. All fleets were maintained by the expanded staff who had transferred. The Class 314 and Class 303 EMUs were transferred from the north of the city to the depot by means of a connecting line just west of Rutherglen station.

Around 1990, a further development saw the transfer of the electric locomotive fleet to Polmadie. This left Shields with a 'captive' fleet to maintain. By now, this fleet had been enhanced by the introduction of the Class 318 EMUs for the newly electrified Ayrshire lines and by the Class 320 fleet for the North Clyde services. Both of which were commissioned out of the depot. As the life expectancy of the Class 303 fleet diminished, a fleet of Class 334 Juniper EMUs were commissioned again by Shields and fully introduced in 2002.

The depot also maintained the Royal Mail Class 325 dual voltage EMUs, in partnership with Selhurst depot in London, prior to their being mothballed in 1999.

Following an announcement by Transport Scotland of the order of a new fleet of Class 380 EMUs, a £24m expansion of the depot got underway. This included a dedicated 3-road maintenance shed to the east of the existing building; this was for the exclusive use of the new sets. Also housed within the building were new office accommodation and stores. As part of the expansion, a new state of the art wheel lathe was also installed enabling faster re-profiling of rolling stock wheelsets.

== Allocation ==
The allocation comprises the following stock:

- Class 318 EMUs (21 sets, since 1986)
- Class 320 EMUs (22 sets, since 1990)
- Class 334 EMUs (40 sets, since 2000)
- Class 380 EMUs (38 sets, since 2010)
- Class 385 EMUs (70 sets, since 2020)

The depot was formerly home to:

- Class 81 electric locomotives (1975-1990)
- Class 303 EMUs (1967-2002)
- Class 305 EMUs (1991-2001)
- Class 311 EMUs (1967-1993)
- Class 314 EMUs (1987-2019)
- Class 322 EMUs (2001-2011)
- Class 325 EMUs (1996-1999)
- Class 365 EMUs (2018-2019)
- Class 370 Advanced Passenger Train-Prototype (1981-1985)

== Gallery ==
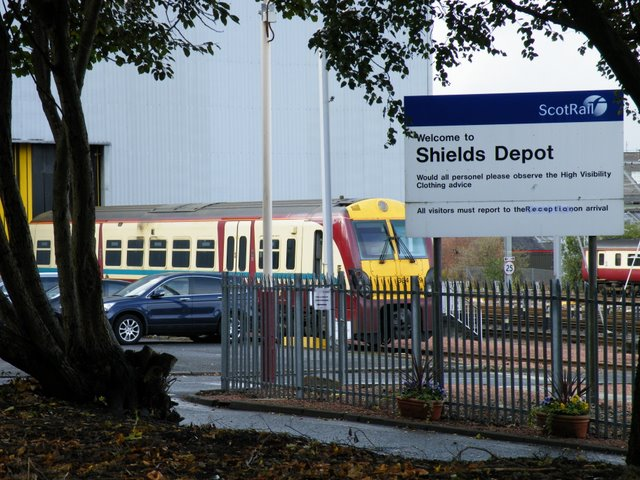
Class 334 outside the depot

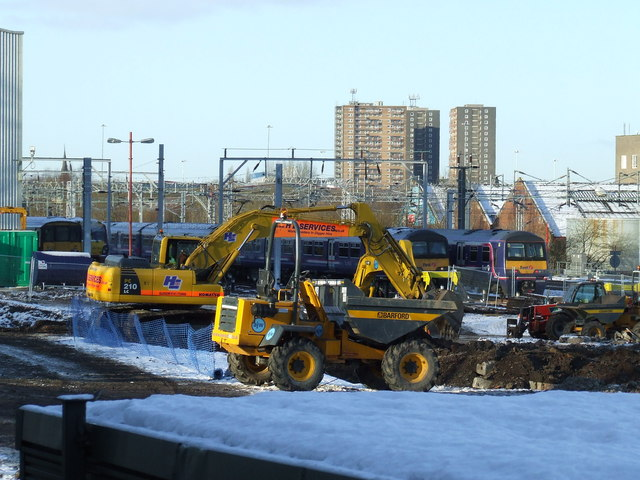
Shields Depot Reconstruction work in 2010

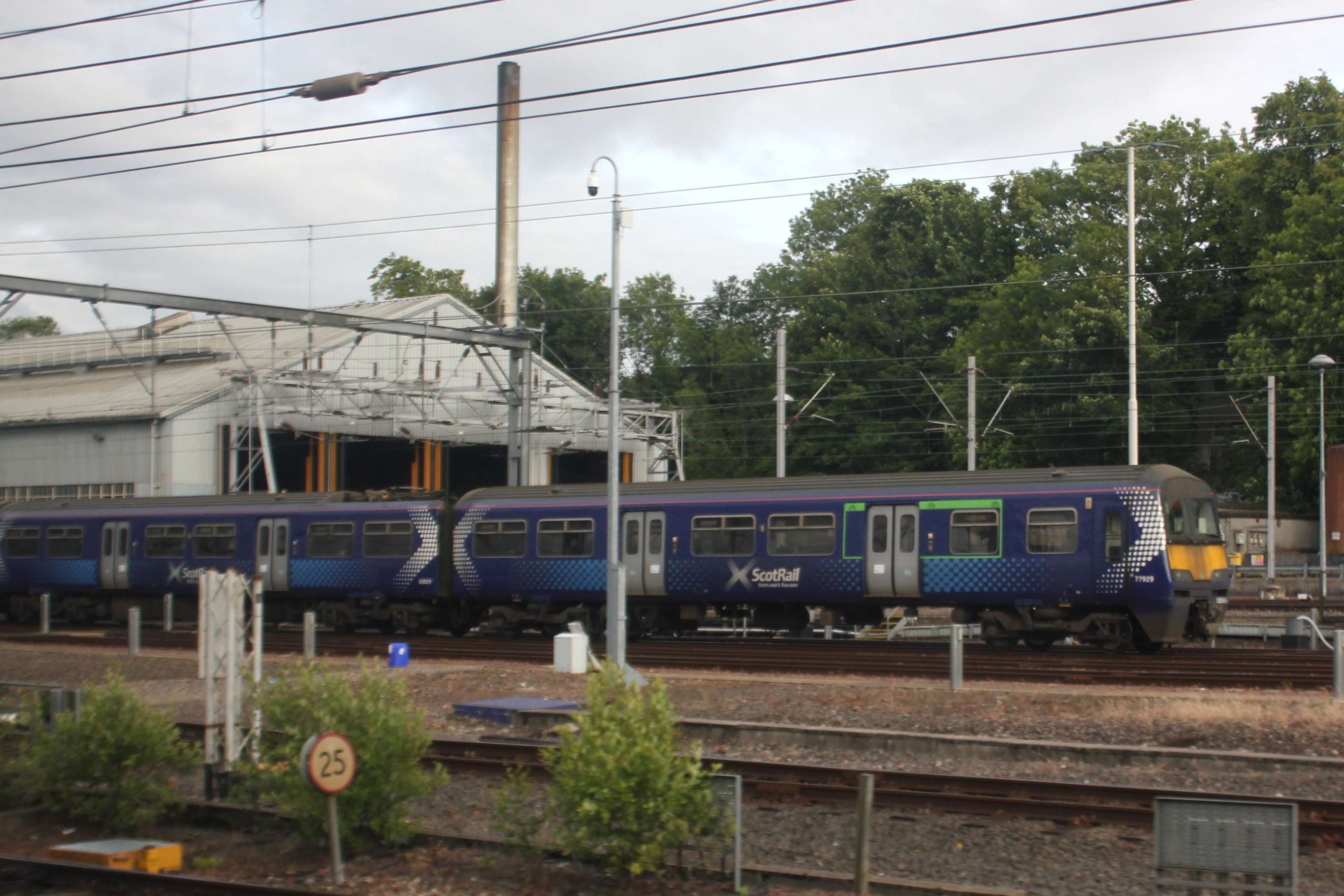
Class 320 outside the depot

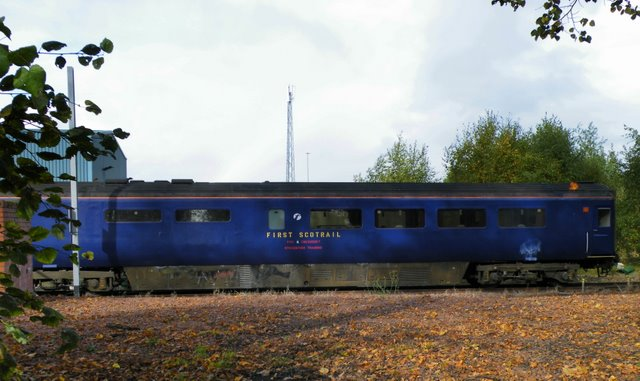
First ScotRail fire training coach at Shields Depot
