= British Rail Class 311 =

Class of 19 three-car electric multiple units

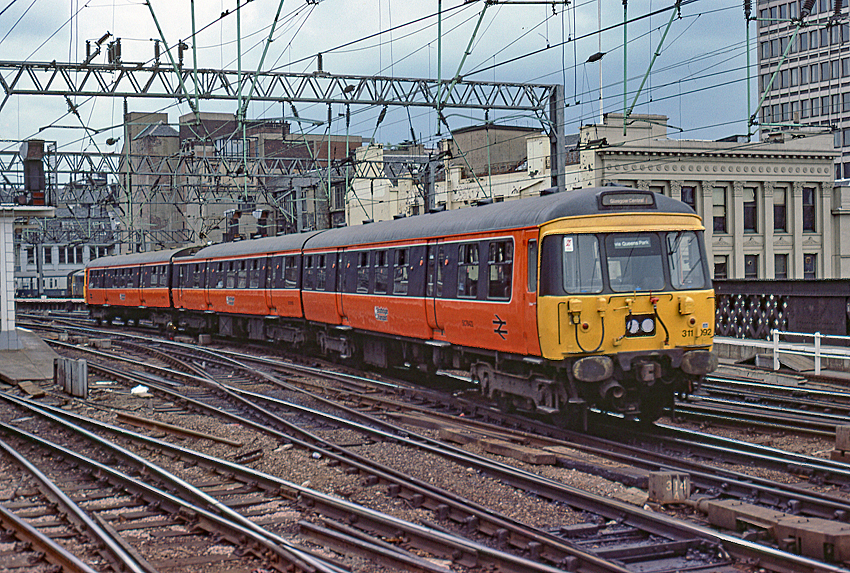
- 311092 at Glasgow Central in 1984
- In service: 1967–1990
- Manufacturer: Cravens
- Order no.: 30767 (DTSO); 30768 (MBSO); 30769 (BDTSO)
- Built at: Sheffield
- Family name: BR First Generation (Mark 1)
- Constructed: 1966–67
- Entered service: 1967
- Number built: 19
- Number preserved: 1
- Number scrapped: 18
- Successor: Class 320
- Formation: 3 cars per unit: DTSO-MBSO-BDTSO
- Diagram: ED211 (MBS); EE214 (DTS); EF212 (BDTS)
- Design code: AM11
- Fleet numbers: 311092–311110 (units); 76403-76421 (DTSO); 62163-62181 (MBSO); 76422-76440 (BDTSO)
- Capacity: 236 seats (total); 83 seats (DTSO); 70 seats (MBSO); 83 seats (BDTSO)
- Operators: British Rail
- Depots: Glasgow Shields Road

Specifications
- Car body construction: Steel
- Train length: 199 ft 6 in (60.81 m)
- Car length: 63 ft 6 1/8 in (19.358 m) (MBSO); 64 ft 0 in (19.498 m) (BDTSO, DTSO)
- Width: 9 ft 3 in (2.819 m)
- Height: 12 ft 8 in (3.861 m)
- Doors: Double sliding leaf, pneumatic
- Wheelbase: 46 ft 6 in (14.173 m)
- Maximum speed: 75 mph (121 km/h)
- Weight: 129 tonnes (127 long tons; 142 short tons) (total); 34.4 t (33.9 long tons; 37.9 short tons) (DTSO); 56.4 t (55.5 long tons; 62.2 short tons) (MBSO); 38.4 t (37.8 long tons; 42.3 short tons) (BDTSO)
- Traction motors: 4 × AEI 221 hp (165 kW)
- Power output: 890 hp (660 kW)
- HVAC: Electric
- Electric system(s): 25 kV 50 Hz AC OHLE
- Current collection: Pantograph
- UIC classification: 2′2′+Bo′Bo′+2′2′
- Bogies: Gresley ED11 (MBSO); Gresley ET11 (BDTSO, DTSO)
- Braking system(s): Air (Auto/EP)
- Safety system(s): AWS
- Coupling system: Buckeye
- Multiple working: Within class, and Class 303
- Track gauge: 1,435 mm (4 ft 8 1/2 in) standard gauge

The British Rail Class 311 alternating current (AC) electric multiple units (EMU) were built by Cravens at Sheffield from 1966 to 1967. They were intended for use on the line from Glasgow Central to Gourock and Wemyss Bay, which was electrified in 1967.

== Appearance ==
Outwardly, the units were virtually identical to the earlier Class 303 units built in 1960. The interiors were also very similar, including the panoramic full forward passenger view through the glass-walled driving cabs, although the Class 311 had fluorescent lighting instead of the tungsten filament bulbs used on the Class 303. The Class 303 units had been built by the Pressed Steel Company at their factory in Linwood, Paisley, but by the time the Class 311 was required, Pressed Steel no longer built railway carriages, so Cravens of Sheffield worked from the same original drawings, updated at a few points, to build the new trains.

Along with the Class 303, the wrap-around driving cab windows were replaced with flat, toughened glass in the 1970s to give better protection to drivers in the event of attacks by stone-throwing vandals.

== Construction ==
19 units were built, initially classified as AM11 units, and numbered 092-110, the numbers following on from the Class 303. This was later changed to Class 311 under the TOPS system, and the units were renumbered 311092-110. Each unit was formed of three carriages; two outer driving trailers and an intermediate motor coach. The technical description of the formation was BDTSO+MBSO+DTSO. Individual carriages were numbered as follows:

- 76403-76421 – DTSO
- 62163-62181 – MBSO
- 76422-76440 – BDTSO

== Operations ==
The units were built to operate services on the newly electrified routes from Glasgow Central to Gourock and to Wemyss Bay; now known as the Inverclyde Line.

In practice, the Class 311 operated almost interchangeably with the Class 303 and could be found in service across the Glasgow electrified suburban network.

Consideration was given to upgrading 11 of the units for use on the newly electrified Ayrshire Coast Line, but it was found to be cheaper to buy new units in the form of the Class 318 and the plan was cancelled.

== Withdrawal ==
Being a much smaller and unrefurbished fleet, the Class 311 was withdrawn much earlier than the Class 303, being replaced by the new Class 320 in 1990.

After being withdrawn from normal traffic, two units, 311103/104 were transferred to departmental duties as Class 936 sandite units, numbered 936103/104. These lasted in service until 1999, when they were withdrawn. They were not immediately scrapped as Railtrack was anxious to ensure that one of the units was preserved. In 2002, Railtrack donated one of the units to the Summerlee Heritage Park museum in Coatbridge, and the other was scrapped in 2003.

One of the driving coaches on the unit donated to Summerlee was scrapped in 2006.

== Preservation ==
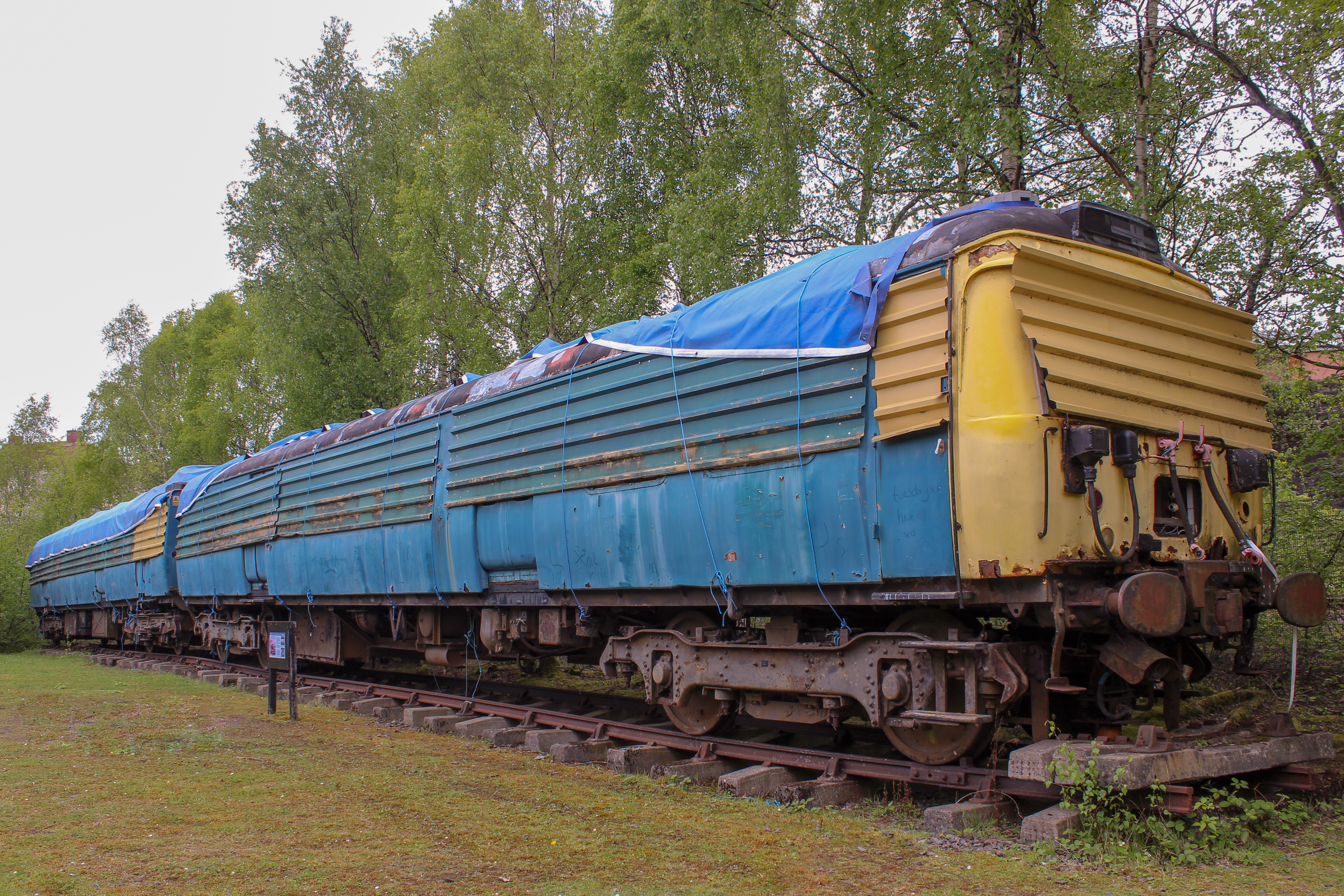
311103 sits at Summerlee Museum of Scottish Industrial Life

- 311103 - 76414+62174+76433 - Summerlee Museum of Scottish Industrial Life, Coatbridge (76414 since scrapped)

This unit was the former Class 936 sandite unit 936103, formed of 977844+977845+977846.

In February 2017, work finally started on restoring the unit to its original condition.
