= British Rail Class 303 =

Electric multiple unit trains (1960–2002)

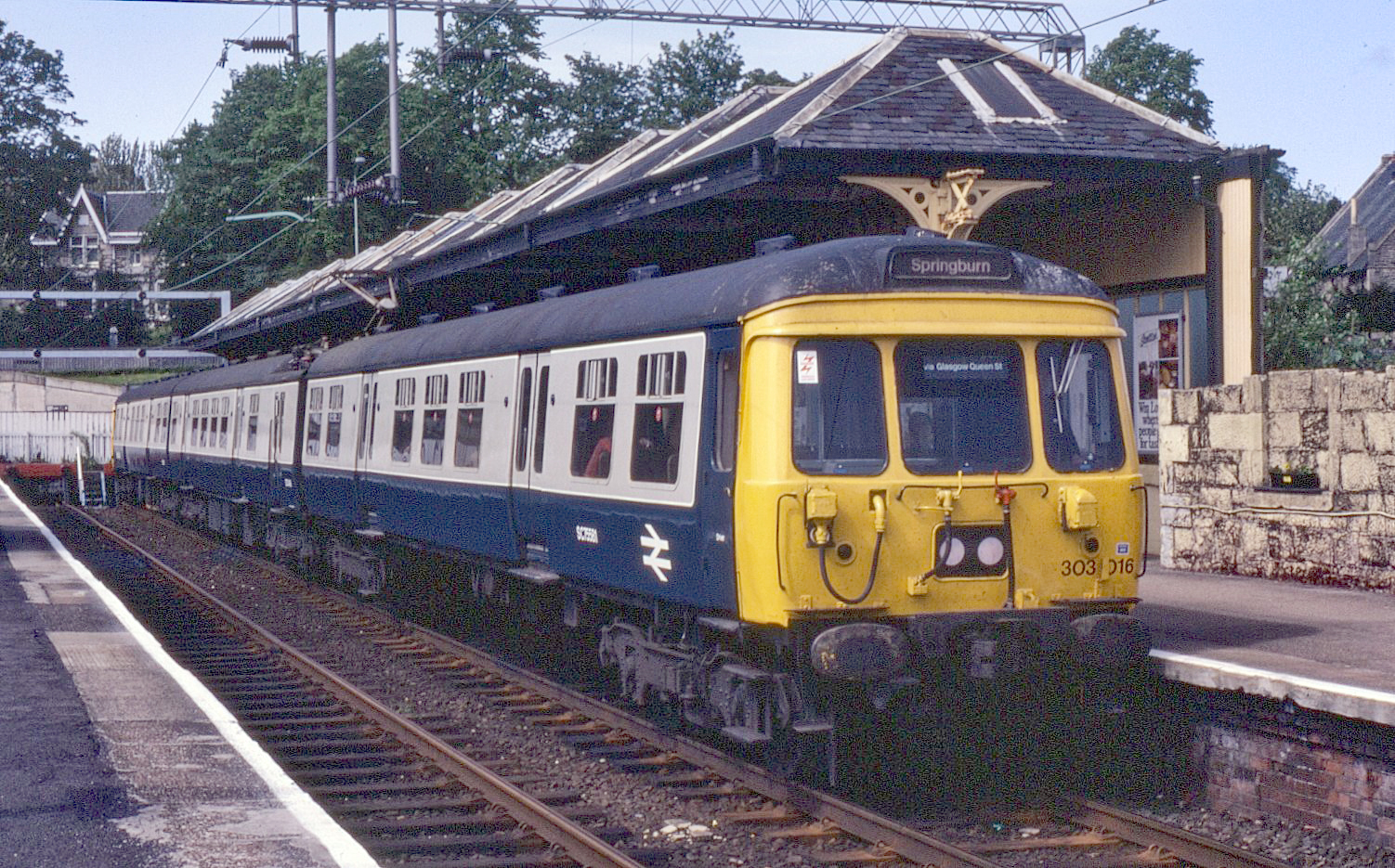
- Class 303 at Milngavie in 1983
- In service: 5 November 1960–30 December 2002
- Manufacturer: Pressed Steel Company
- Order nos.: 30579 (DTSO 75566-75600), 30629 (DTSO, 75747-75801), 30580 (MBSO 61481-61515), 30630 (MBSO 61812-61867), 30581 (BDTSO 75601-75635), 30631 (BDTSO 75802-75857)
- Built at: Linwood, Renfrewshire
- Family name: BR First Generation Mark 1
- Replaced: Various steam engines/early carriages
- Constructed: 1959–1961
- Entered service: 1960–1961
- Refurbished: 1984 - c.1990
- Scrapped: 1974–2003
- Number built: 91
- Number preserved: 1
- Number scrapped: 90
- Successor: Class 320, Class 334
- Formation: 3 cars per unit: DTS+MBS+BDTS (as built); DTSO+MBSO+BDTSO (rebuilt)
- Diagram: EE206 (DTSO, 303/0), ED201 (MBSO, 303/0), EF202 (BDTSO, 303/0), EE241 (DTSO, 303/1), ED220 (MBSO, 303/1), EF217 (BDTSO, 303/1)
- Design code: AM3
- Fleet numbers: 303001–303091 (full sets); 75566-75600, 75746-75801 (DTSO), 61481-61515, 61812-61867 (MBSO), 75601-75635, 75802-75857 (BDTSO)
- Capacity: 236 seats (as built), 160 seats (rebuilt)
- Operators: British Rail, ScotRail (National Express)
- Depots: Glasgow Shields Road, Hyndland; Yoker, Longsight Electric TMD, Bridgeton Central
- Lines served: North Clyde Line, Cathcart Circle Lines, Weaver Junction and Liverpool Line, Crewe to Manchester Line, Glossop Line

Specifications
- Car body construction: Steel
- Train length: 199 ft 6 in (60.81 m)
- Car length: 63 ft 11.5 in (19.49 m) (DTS, BDTS); 63 ft 2.25 in (19.26 m) (MBS)
- Width: 9 ft 3 in (2.82 m)
- Height: 12 ft 8 in (3.86 m)
- Floor height: 3 ft 7.5 in (1.1 m)
- Doors: Twin leaf sliding, pneumatically operated
- Articulated sections: 3
- Wheelbase: 46 ft 6 in (14.17 m) (bogie centres, per car)
- Maximum speed: 75 mph (121 km/h)
- Weight: 124 long tons (126 t; 139 short tons) (set); 34.4 t (33.9 long tons; 37.9 short tons) (DTSO), 56.4 t (55.5 long tons; 62.2 short tons) (MBSO), 38.4 t (37.8 long tons; 42.3 short tons) (BDTSO)
- Traction motors: 4 × MV 155kW
- Power output: 618 kW (829 hp)
- HVAC: Electric
- Electric systems: 25 kV AC & 6.25 kV AC overhead
- Current collection: Pantograph
- UIC classification: 2′2′+Bo′Bo′+2′2′
- Bogies: Gresley ET3 (DTS, BDTS), Gresley ED3 (MBS)
- Braking systems: Electropneumatic,
- Safety system: AWS
- Coupling system: Automatic drophead buckeye (outer), Automatic solid shank Alliance No.2 (inner)
- Multiple working: Within class and Class 311
- Track gauge: 1,435 mm (4 ft 8 1/2 in) standard gauge

The British Rail Class 303 electric multiple units, also known as "Blue Train" units, were introduced in 1960 following the electrification of the North Clyde and the Cathcart Circle lines in Strathclyde, Scotland. They were initially classified as AM3 units before the introduction of the TOPS classification system and were the dominant EMU on the Glasgow suburban railway network for over 25 years, before being progressively phased out by newer rolling stock. The final units were withdrawn from service in 2002. The fleet's lifespan was 42 years.

The units were used later on the Inverclyde and Argyle lines of the Glasgow suburban railway network, as various electrification schemes came to fruition, and in Greater Manchester, England.

== Description ==
Ninety-one three-car units were built by Pressed Steel at Linwood, near Paisley, from 1959 to 1961; they were introduced into service in 1960. A further 19 near-identical Class 311 units were built from 1966 to 1967 following the Inverclyde electrification, although these units were built by Cravens in Sheffield.

When new, the units were numbered initially in the range 001-091, but were later renumbered to 303 001-091 when TOPS was introduced. Each unit consisted of three cars, coupled together in a semi-permanent formation; up to four sets could be operated in multiple to form up to a 12-car formation. Although six-car formations were operated frequently, nine-car formations were operated occasionally. Twelve-car formations were usually only seen as a result of train failures or ECS workings to the depots at Shields Road or Hyndland. The two outer carriages of each unit were driving trailers, with an intermediate motor coach containing the motor bogies and electrical equipment. Units operated from the standard 25 kV alternating current (AC) overhead power lines system, with power collection via a Stone Faiveley AMBR pantograph on the motor coach. The technical description of the formation is DTSO+MBSO+BDTSO. Individual vehicle numbers are shown below.

- 75566-75600 and 75746-75801 - DTSO
- 61481-61515 and 61812-61867 - MBSO
- 75601-75635 and 75802-75857 - BDTSO

The class was built in two batches; units 303001-035 were built 1959-60 (nominally for the North Clyde Line) and units 303036-091 were built 1960-61 (nominally for the Cathcart Circle Lines). In practice, when built, the North Clyde lines required the majority of the units. There was no electrified connection between the two networks until late in the life of the trains, and thus transfers between the two halves of the system, performed quite regularly, were dragged by locomotives via the Shields Road-High Street line. As the Class 303 were air braked and most diesel locomotives of the early era were vacuum braked, a few Class 20 diesels were fitted with air brake connections for this. When the Class 303 units were new, there were still a few former Caledonian Railway 4-4-0 steam locomotives in stock with the Westinghouse air brake, which were used for the transfers and for delivering the units from their factory in Linwood.

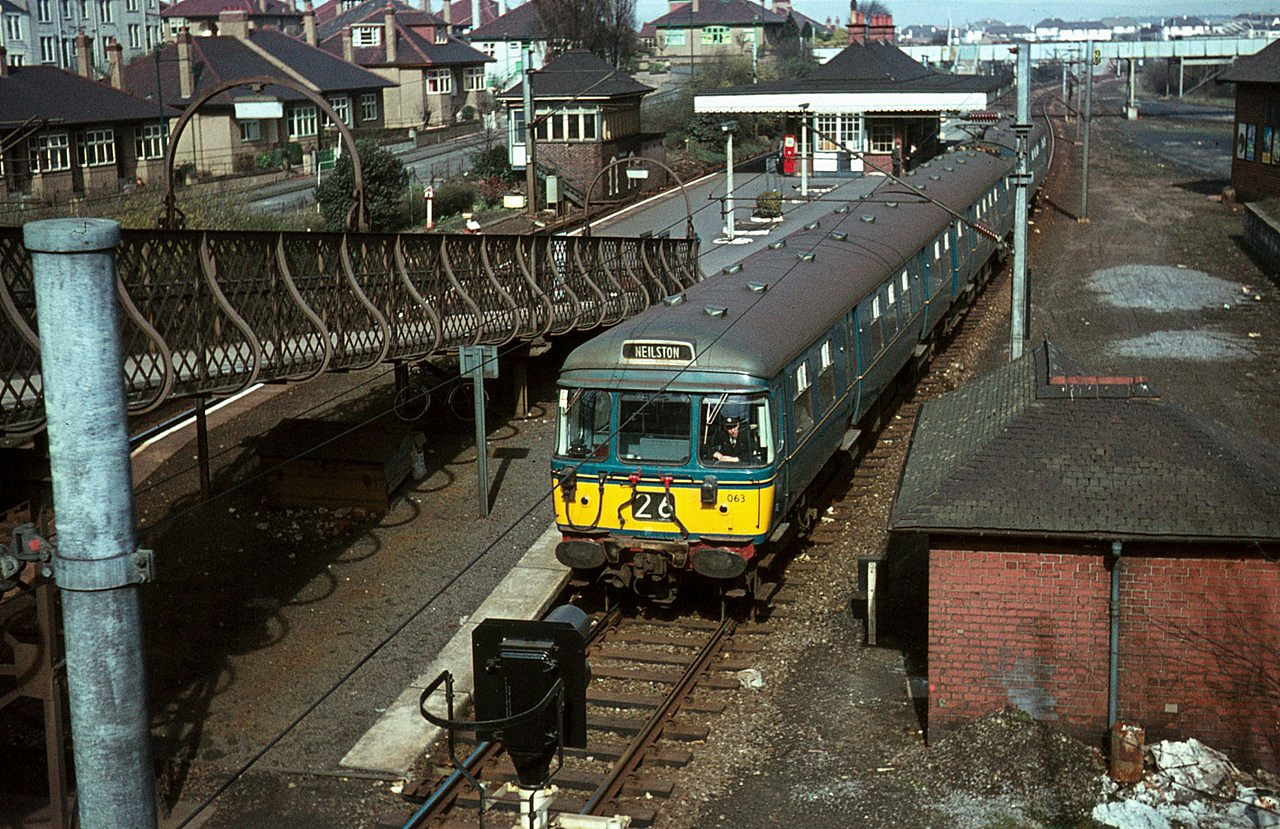
Class 303 with the original cab windows at Muirend in 1966

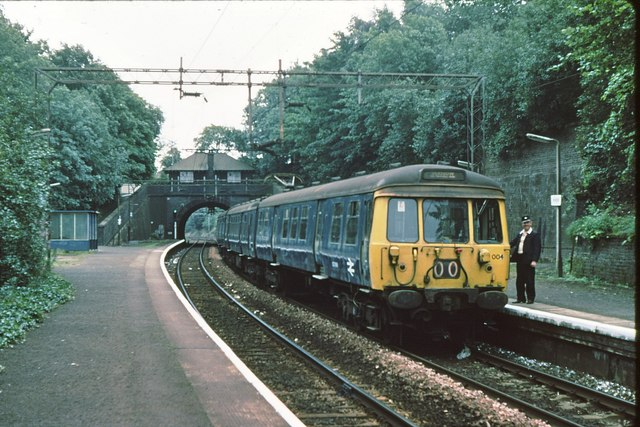
Class 303 at Kirkhill in 1979

Based on the Mark 1 bodyshell design, the Class 303 units utilised electrical gear made by Metropolitan-Vickers (Metrovick). They were originally dual voltage; parts of the North Clyde Line and Cathcart Circle electrification was limited to 6.25 kV (rather than the standard 25 kV arrangement) due to limitations in insulation technology, although this feature was rendered redundant as 25 kV was eventually standardised across the entire line. Following a series of transformer explosions, caused by damage to the transformer windings from backfires in the mercury arc rectifiers, the entire stock of Class 303s had to be hastily withdrawn from service after only a few weeks' service. Over the weekend of 17/18 December 1960, all 72 EMU sets were taken into storage and the old steam-operated service was temporarily reinstated, whilst urgent modifications were made. This also delayed the handing over of the Cathcart Circle service to electric operation.

The units had many features which made them state of the art at the time of their introduction. This included the use of pneumatically operated sliding passenger doors, the only Mark 1 based EMU to use this feature, with passenger-operated door opening buttons. In practice, the doors were usually operated by the train guard and, later, by the driver after modification for driver-only operation).

When built, the driving cabs had distinctive wrap-around front windows, although these were replaced by flat, toughened glass in the 1970s to better protect drivers following some incidents of stone-throwing vandalism. Glass partitions behind the cabs allowed passengers in the front and rearmost carriages to see the drivers' view of the track. This was particularly appreciated in the scenic riverside areas around Craigendoran and Helensburgh.

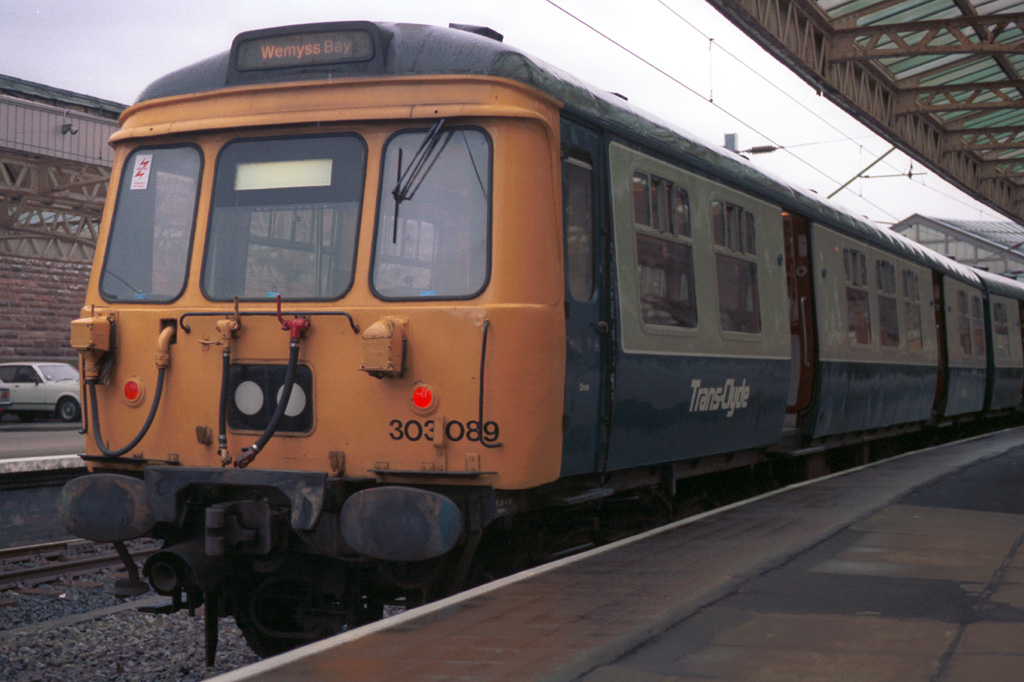
Class 303 in unrefurbished condition with TransClyde markings at Wemyss Bay in 1984

Following the electrification of the lines from Glasgow Central to Gourock and Wemyss Bay in 1967, the Class 303s started to be used interchangeably with the almost identical new Class 311s. The interiors of the Class 303s were fitted with tungsten light bulbs, whilst the Class 311s had fluorescent lighting.

The Class 303 fleet were nicknamed the "Blue Trains" upon their introduction, owing to the striking Caledonian Blue livery. This was later changed to the standard BR Blue, quickly superseded by BR Blue/Grey livery in the late 1960s and early 1970s although the nickname itself persisted through subsequent livery changes right up until the class's withdrawal.

== Refurbishment ==
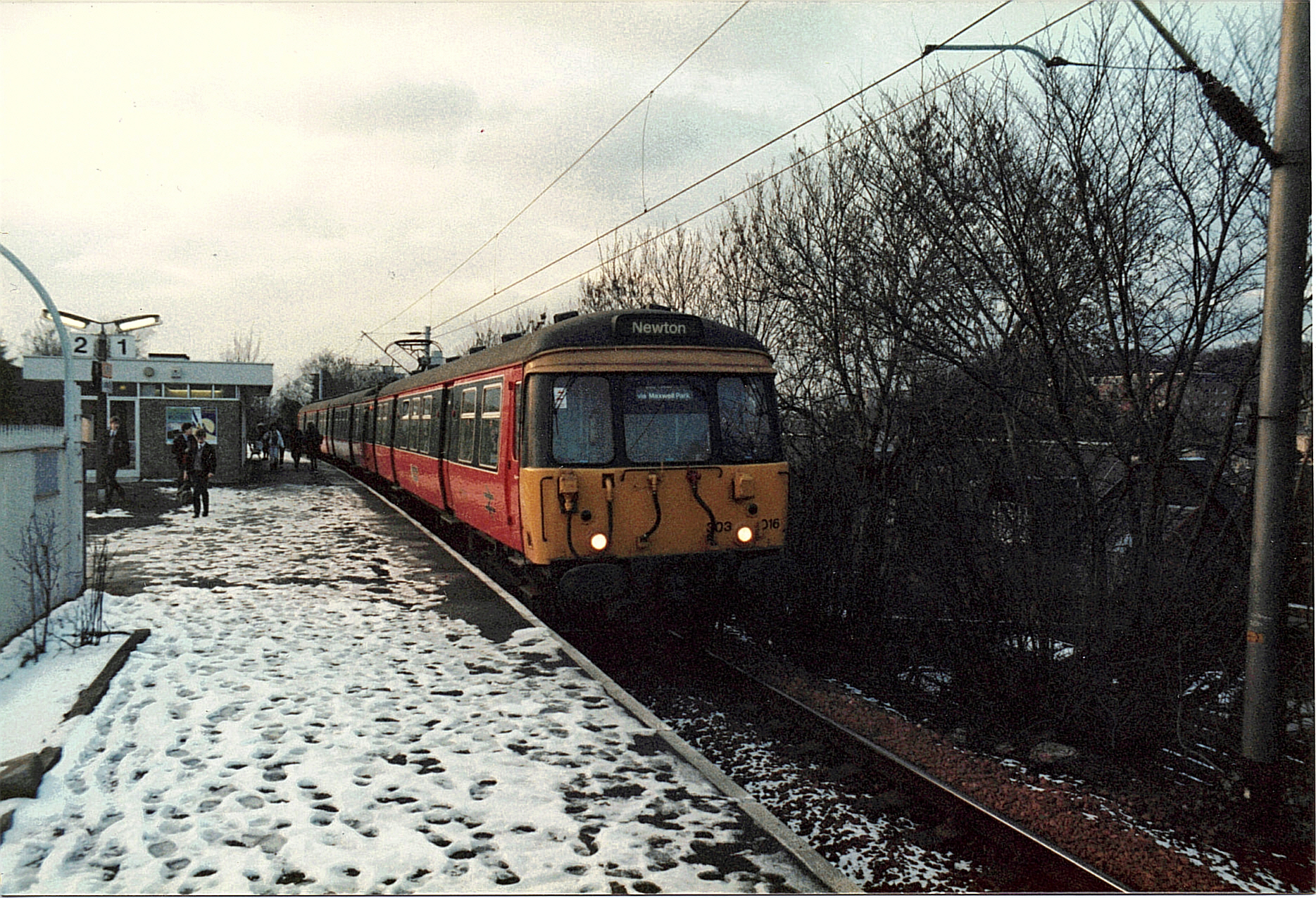
Refurbished Class 303 at Langside on a service to Newton in 1986

In 1984, the Provincial ScotRail sector of British Rail began a major refurbishment programme for 50 of the 25-year-old units. To conform to contemporary health and safety standards the asbestos insulation was removed. Among the many changes introduced were connecting doors between coaches and a new type of push button passenger door control, along with all-new interiors and new fluorescent lighting. Most units also received new "hopper-style" windows. The new seating was controversial; it was almost identical to that of the Class 314, albeit with a 2+2 configuration. This allowed for many more standing passengers, but with far fewer seats than previously. The glass bulkheads behind the driving cabs were another casualty of the refurbishment - passengers could no longer see the driver's view through the front windows. Following refurbishment, units were repainted in the striking new orange and black livery introduced by the newly created Strathclyde PTE.

== Decline ==
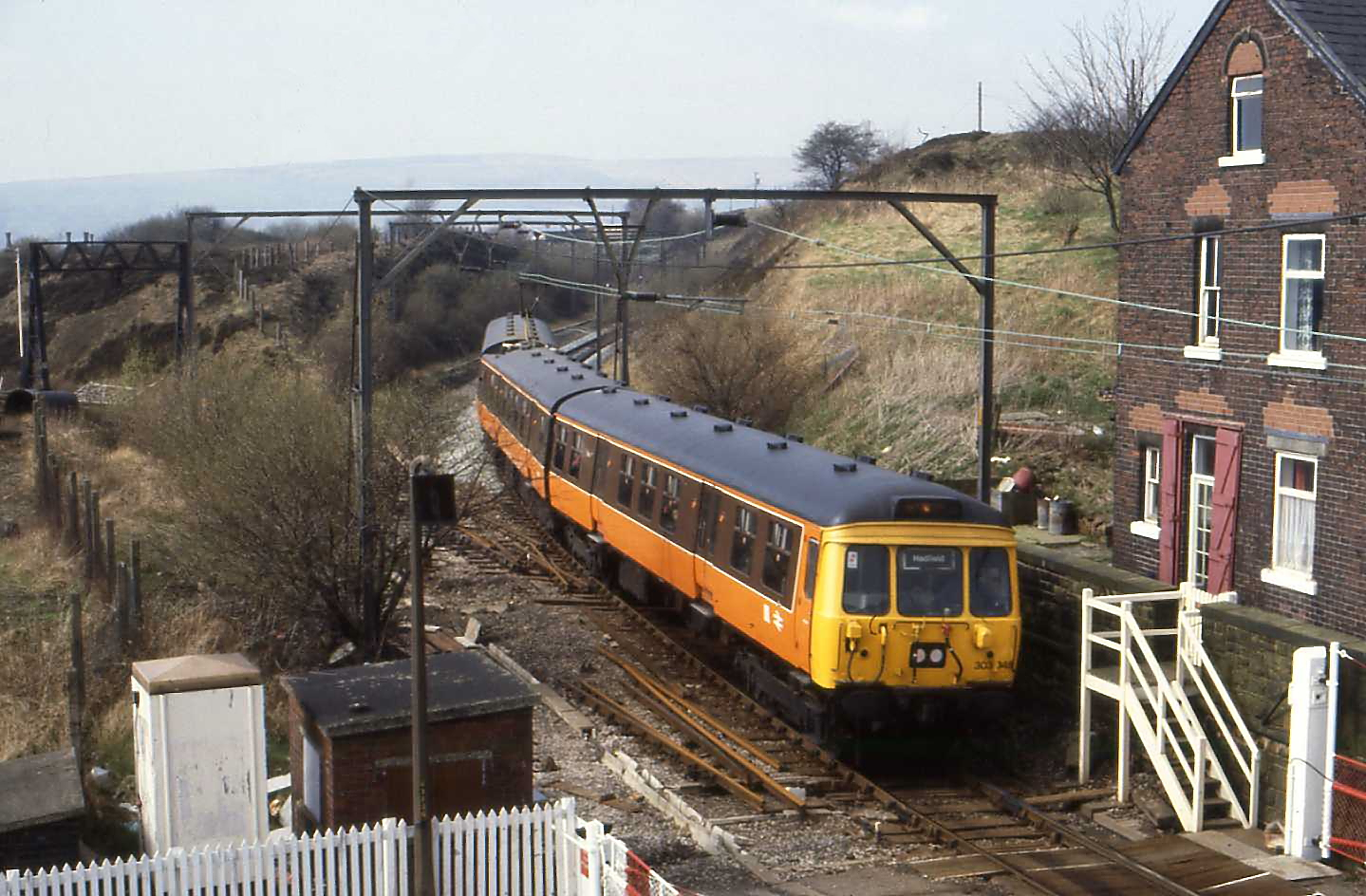
A Class 303 in service at Dinting in Greater Manchester PTE livery

Most of the remaining unrefurbished units in Scotland were withdrawn at the end of the 1980s, following the introduction of new Class 320 units on the North Clyde route in 1989.

However, in the early 1980s, following a decline in passengers in the Glasgow area, several Class 303s were transferred to north-west England. Initially, they were used on the Crewe to Liverpool service, but were soon transferred to the Manchester area, operating services from Manchester Piccadilly to Altrincham, Hazel Grove, Macclesfield, Alderley Edge, Crewe and on the line to Glossop and Hadfield; this line had recently been converted from 1,500 V DC. The 303s replaced the Class 506s.

All but one of these, no. 303048, were withdrawn by the mid-1990s. This unit was transferred north again to Glasgow and retained in unrefurbished condition for special trains. It was originally intended to preserve this unit but, due to asbestos contamination, it was scrapped in 1998.

Following the privatisation of British Rail, the surviving 40 units passed to the ScotRail franchise. By now, electrification around Glasgow had spread and units could be found working on many routes, such as those to Gourock, Motherwell, Coatbridge and Ardrossan Town. Four units, nos. 303019/021/023/087, received SPT's new carmine and cream livery.

ScotRail ordered 40 Class 334s were built from 1999-2000 by Alstom to replace the last of the elderly units. After an introduction plagued with teething problems, the Class 334 fleet entered service on the SPT network in 2001, allowing the Class 303 units to be withdrawn. Following withdrawal, the units were towed to Immingham RFT for scrapping. The last Class 303 passenger train operated on the North Clyde Line on 30 December 2002, formed of units 303011 and 303088, operating the 09:27 Bellgrove to Helensburgh Central. The stock then worked ECS to Yoker Depot, where they were withdrawn from service.

== Incidents and accidents ==
The Class 303s were involved in many accidents in their 42 years of service:

Date	Number	
30/08/73	303091	Involved in Gower Street Collision while working 21:35 Wemyss Bay to Glasgow Central.
31/05/75	303007	Crashed into cement train at Rutherglen while working 08:25 Glasgow Central to Hamilton Circle.
20/06/75	303022	Crashed into buffers at Lanark while working 14:33 Glasgow Central to Lanark.
16/04/79	303074; 303036	Involved in Gilmour Street Collision while working 19:40 Glasgow Central to Wemyss Bay.
--/--/80	303002	Ran away at Neilston station and became the first unit to be scrapped.
07/03/85	303072	Struck a girder placed on track at Singer while working 22.46 Airdrie to Balloch. The front bogie of 75782 was ripped off.
--/--/86	303057	Motor coach fire.
11/09/86	303026	Two units collided in the tunnel near Bridgeton Depot, leading to the death of a driver and a guard.
30/01/87	303051	Ran away and collided with diesel locomotive 37011 near Dalmuir.
06/03/89	303005; 303071	Head-on collision between 303005 and 303071 at Bellgrove Junction.
01/05/91	303038	Motor coach exploded at Shields Depot.
21/07/91	303037	Head-on collision between 303037 and a Class 314 at Newton.
25/06/94	303046	Hit object placed on track by vandals on Wemyss Bay branch.
--/--/99	303058	Motor Coach blew up in service.

== Further use ==
A few vehicles were converted for departmental use, following withdrawal from service:

- BDTSO 75613 from unit 303013 is currently at the Metropolitan Police Specialist Training Centre in Gravesend, Kent.
- Unit 303049 was converted into a test unit, numbered 303999. It was used by Network SouthEast from 1991 until 1996, based at Ilford and then Clacton; it was later scrapped.

	DT	Old Number	MB	Old Number	DT	Old Number
303999	ADB977711	(75759)	ADB977712	(61825)	ADB977713	(75815)

== Preservation ==
One complete unit has been saved for preservation. It is a hybrid unit consisting of the driving vehicles from set 303032 and the motor coach from set 303023, which replaced set 303032's own damaged motor coach. Unit 303023 was one of only four to carry the later SPT carmine/cream livery. The set has been modified to operate in multiple with a blue-star compatible diesel locomotive, typically a Class 27, so that it can be driven on an unelectrified heritage line.

Unit no.	DTSO	MBSO	BDTSO	Livery	Location	Photograph
303023	-	61503	-	SPT Carmine/Cream	Bo'ness and Kinneil Railway	
303032	75597	-	75632	Strathclyde PTE Orange/Black	Bo'ness and Kinneil Railway	

A complete Class 311 unit, which were almost identical to the Class 303s, was preserved at Summerlee Museum of Scottish Industrial Life in Coatbridge, although one driving trailer has since been scrapped.

== Named units ==
Unit 303089 was named Cowal Highland Gathering 1894-1994.
