= British Rail Class 318 =

British electric multiple-unit passenger trainset

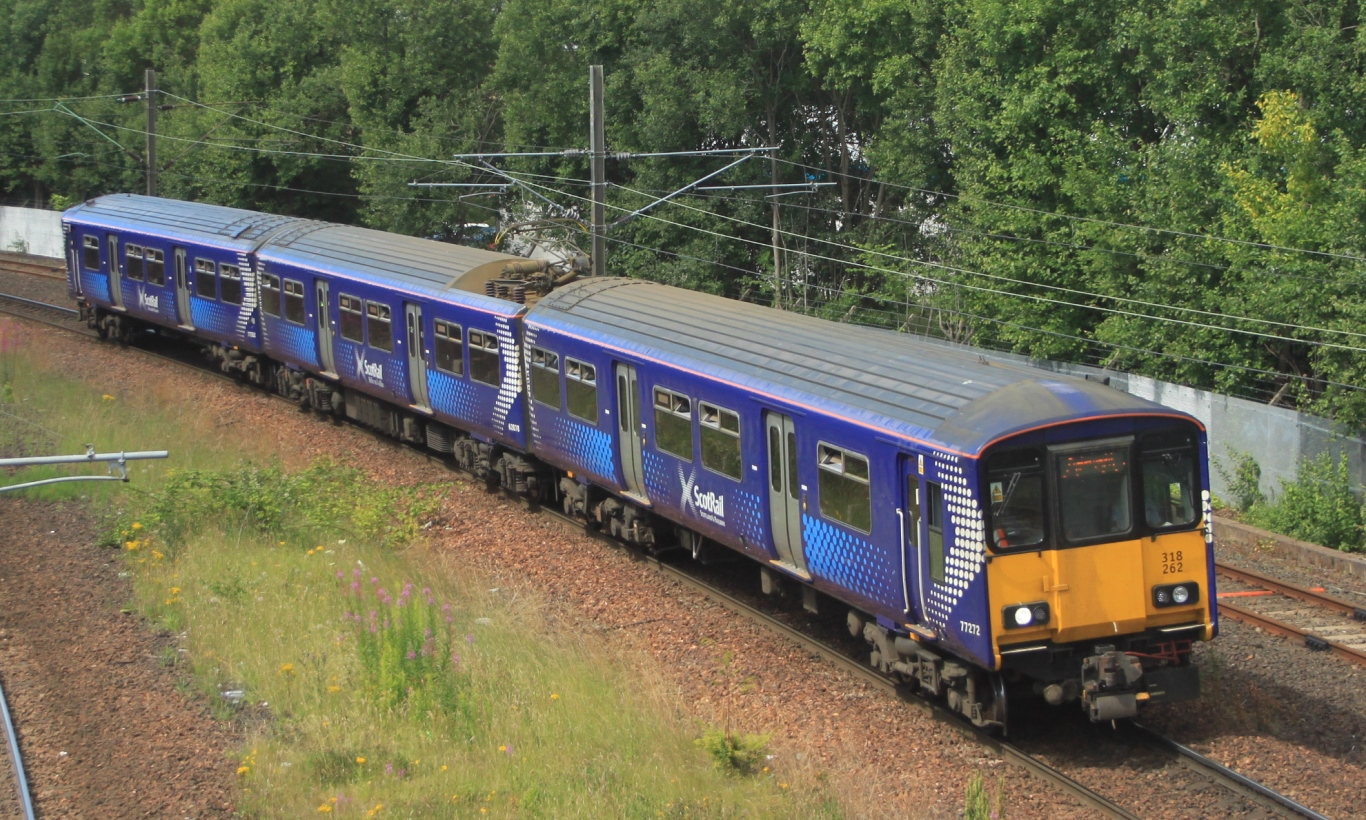
- ScotRail Class 318 at Hyndland in 2016

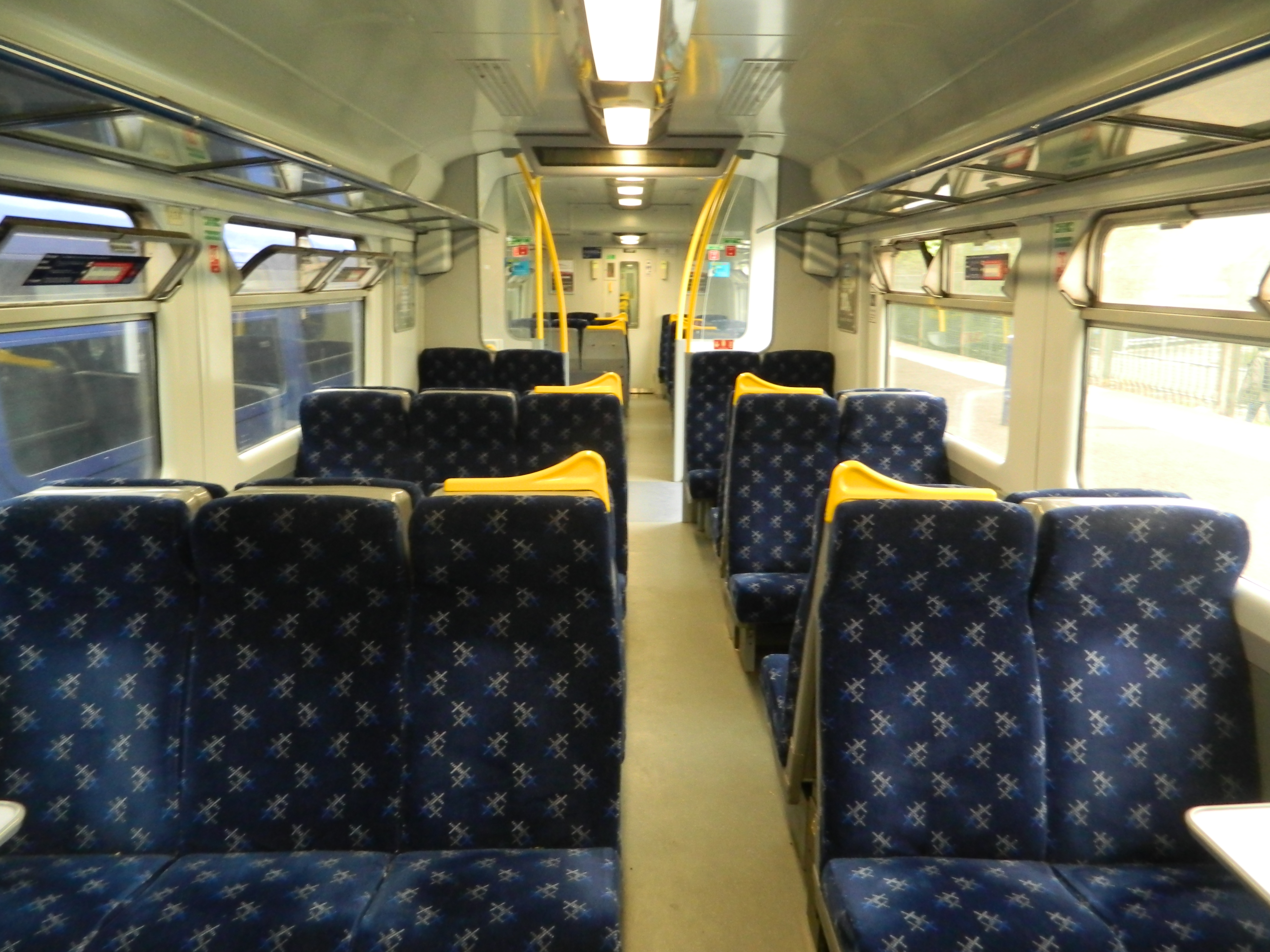
- Interior of a refurbished Abellio ScotRail Class 318
- In service: 29 September 1986 – present
- Manufacturer: British Rail Engineering Limited
- Built at: Holgate Road Works, York
- Family name: BR Second Generation (Mark 3)
- Replaced: BR First Generation DMUs
- Constructed: 1985–1986
- Refurbished: 2005–2007 at Hunslet-Barclay, Kilmarnock; 2013–2017 at Wabtec, Doncaster; 2021–2023 at Brodie Engineering, Kilmarnock
- Number built: 21
- Formation: 3 cars per unit: DTSOL-MSO-DTSO
- Diagram: DTSOL vehicles: EE227; MSO vehicles: EC207; DTSO vehicles: EE228
- Fleet numbers: 318250–318270
- Capacity: As built: 216 seats; Current: 208 seats
- Owner: Eversholt Rail Group
- Operator: ScotRail
- Depot: Shields Road (Glasgow)

Specifications
- Car body construction: Steel
- Car length: DTS vehs.: 19.830 m (65 ft 0.7 in); MS vehs.: 19.920 m (65 ft 4.3 in)
- Width: 2.816 m (9 ft 2.9 in)
- Height: 3.774 m (12 ft 4.6 in)
- Doors: Double-leaf pocket sliding, each 1.010 m (3 ft 3.8 in) wide (2 per side per car)
- Wheelbase: Over bogie centres: 14.170 m (46 ft 5.9 in)
- Maximum speed: 90 mph (145 km/h)
- Weight: DTSOL vehs.: 30.1 t (29.6 long tons; 33.2 short tons); MSO vehs.: 50.9 t (50.1 long tons; 56.1 short tons); DTSO vehs.: 29.6 t (29.1 long tons; 32.6 short tons)
- Traction motors: Brush TM21-41
- Power output: 990 kW (1,328 hp)
- Acceleration: 0.56 m/s^{2} (1.3 mph/s) max.
- Electric system: 25 kV 50 Hz AC overhead
- Current collection: Pantograph (Stone Faiveley AMBR)
- UIC classification: 2′2′+Bo′Bo′+2′2′
- Bogies: Powered: BREL BP20; Unpowered: BREL BT13
- Minimum turning radius: 70.4 m (231 ft 0 in)
- Braking system: Electro-pneumatic (disc)
- Safety systems: AWS; TPWS
- Coupling system: Tightlock
- Multiple working: Within class, and with Class 320
- Track gauge: 1,435 mm (4 ft 8 1/2 in) standard gauge

Notes/references
- Specifications as at October 1986 except where otherwise noted.

The British Rail Class 318 is an electric multiple unit (EMU) passenger train which operates in west central Scotland. The units were introduced on 29 September 1986 as part of the electrification of the Ayrshire Coast Line between Glasgow Central and Ayr/Ardrossan with alternating current (AC) overhead lines. Their use was extended to Largs in January 1987. They were also used on the Inverclyde Line in small numbers. The trains currently operate Argyle Line (including services to Lanark from Glasgow Central High Level), Cathcart Circle Line, North Clyde Line, Whifflet Line, Paisley Canal Line and Inverclyde Line services. Following the withdrawal of the second generation of Glasgow Subway rolling stock in 2024, these units are the oldest working EMUs in Scotland, having been in revenue-earning service for more than 39 years.

== Background and history ==
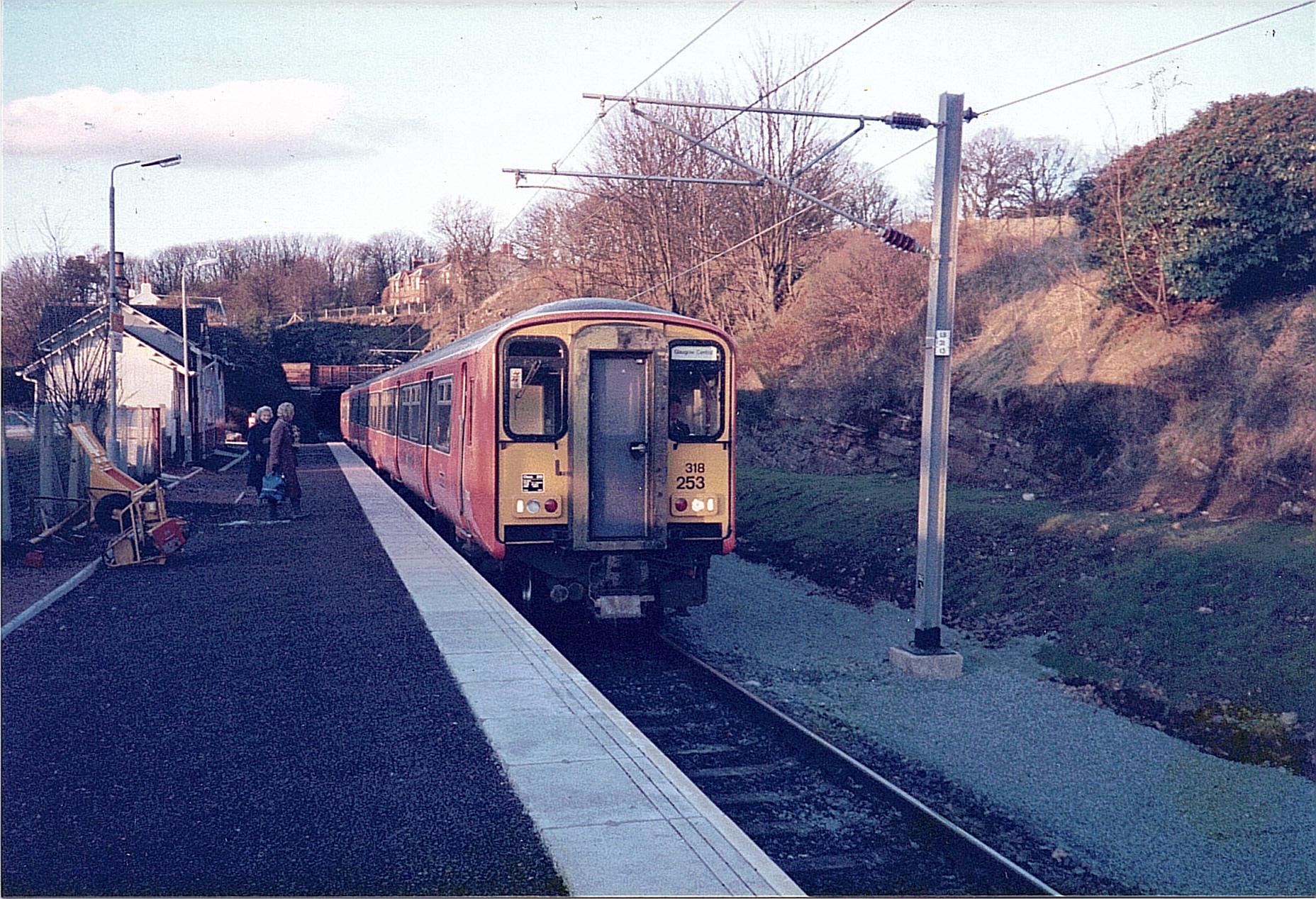
Class 318 at Fairlie in the first month of electric operation

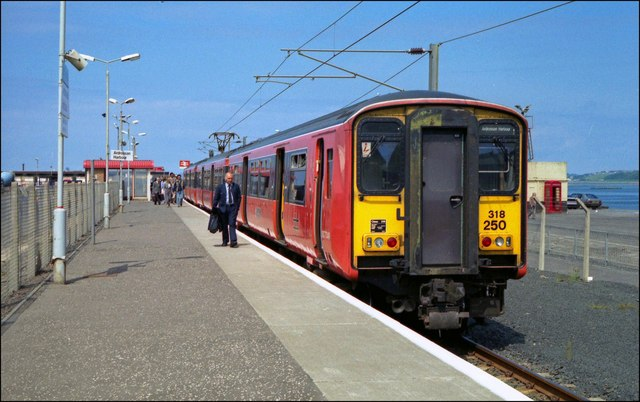
Class 318 in original orange and black Strathclyde Transport livery at Ardrossan Harbour in 1990

Effectively a three-car version of the Class 317, 21 of these British Rail Mark 3-based units were built by BREL York works between 1985–1986 to replace the elderly Class 101, Class 107, Class 120 and Class 126 diesel multiple units (DMUs) which had worked the Glasgow South Western sector for nearly 30 years. The technical description of the units are DTSO+MSO+DTSO, consisting of a central motor car (with a roof mounted Stone Faiveley AMBR pantograph and four traction motors located under the floor within both bogies (two motors per bogie)) with a driving trailer at either end. The units run on the standard 25 kV AC overhead line system, and are standard-class throughout.

The units have a maximum speed of 90 mph (145 km/h) and up to four sets can be worked in multiple to form a 12-car set, although platforms are capable only of handling eight-car trains. The Class 318 can also operate in multiple with the slightly newer Class 320 in a six-car formation, regularly used on the North Clyde and Argyle Lines. Upon the introduction of the Class 334 on Ayrshire/Inverclyde routes in 2001, both the Class 334 and Class 318 were found operating the North Clyde and Argyle Lines together.

== Accidents and incidents ==
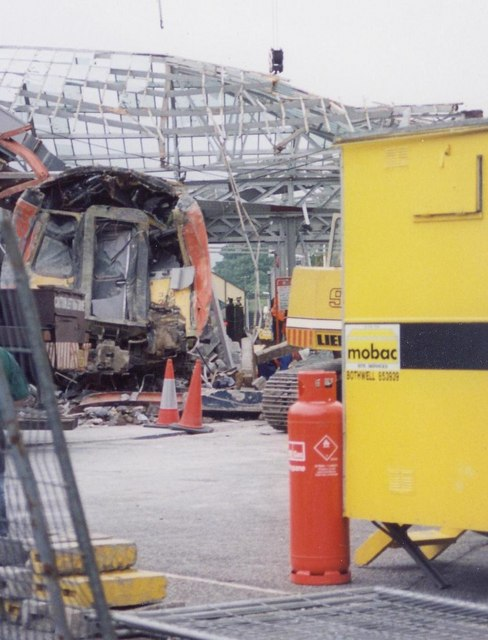
Front view of 318254 shortly after the crash at Largs station

- In July 1995, units 318254 and 318262 were operating a Glasgow Central to Largs service when a braking system failure resulted in the train overshooting the end of the platform at Largs railway station. The train crashed through shops at the front of the station, and out into Main Street, Largs. As it was very early in the morning, there were no serious injuries. The cab of vehicle 77244 (from set 318254) needed to be completely rebuilt, but 318262 managed to move by rail back to Shields depot. The reconstruction of the station building took almost ten years to complete.
- On 3 September 2007, the last carriage of unit 318254 was derailed at low speed as it passed over facing points between Exhibition Centre and Anderston stations, Glasgow. The carriage tilted over and came to rest at an angle of approximately 75 degrees against the tunnel wall.
- On 16 January 2008, unit 318267 was involved in a minor collision at Glasgow Central station. Class 334 unit 334017 was working the 08:24 passenger service from Gourock when it collided with the empty, stationary 318 while preparing to terminate at Glasgow Central. The 334 was in the process of braking and was travelling at less than 4 mph (6 km/h) when the collision occurred. Four passengers were slightly injured, of whom one required hospital attention.
- On 7 May 2022, a Class 320 (320309) and a Class 318 (318262) derailed between Blairhill and Coatbridge Sunnyside. The train was an empty coaching stock running from Yoker C.S to Shields TMD and was going via the North Clyde due to the Argyle line being closed. Nobody was injured.

== Refurbishment ==
=== 2005-2007 ===
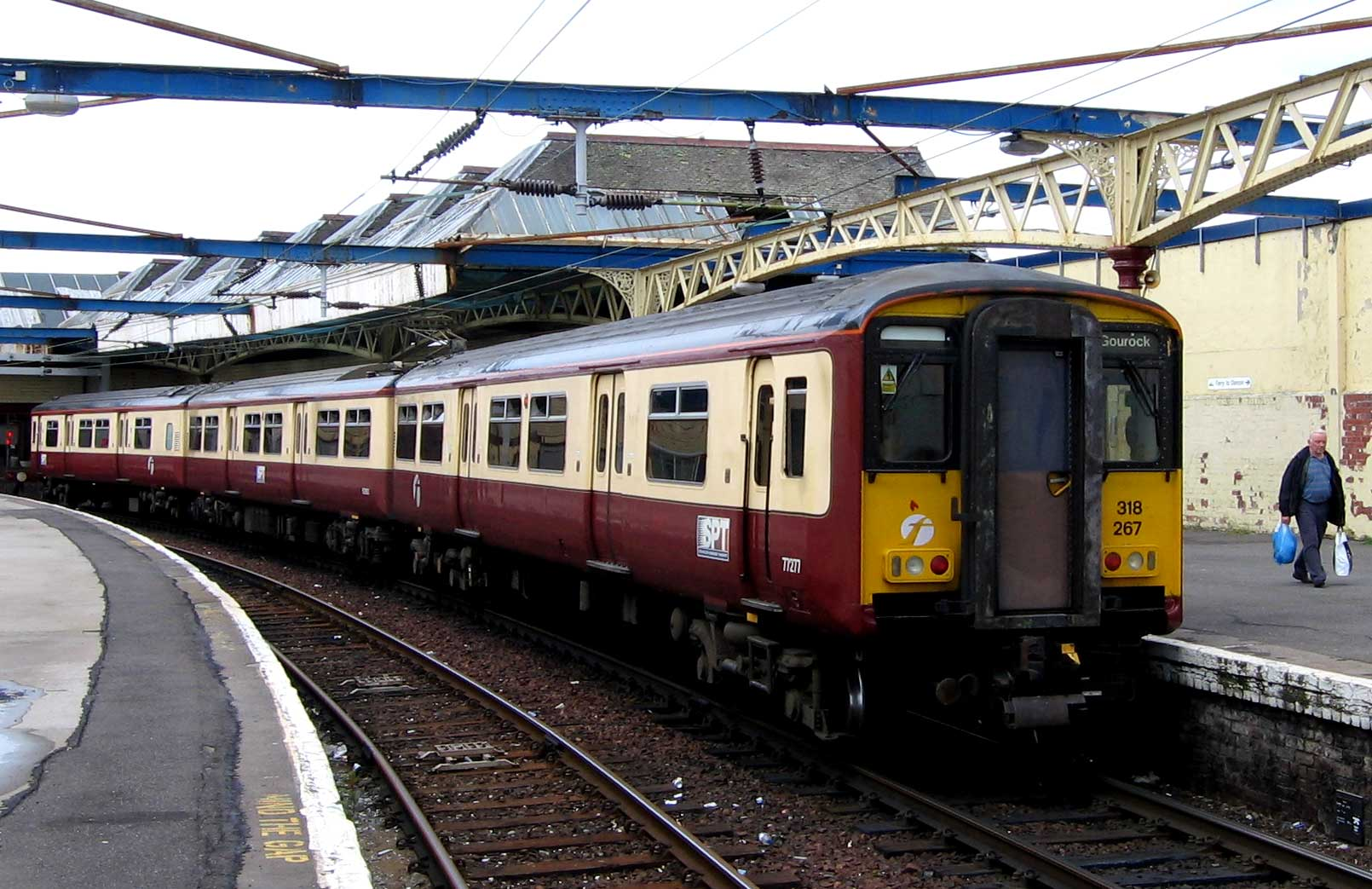
Class 318 in SPT livery with original front end at Gourock in 2006

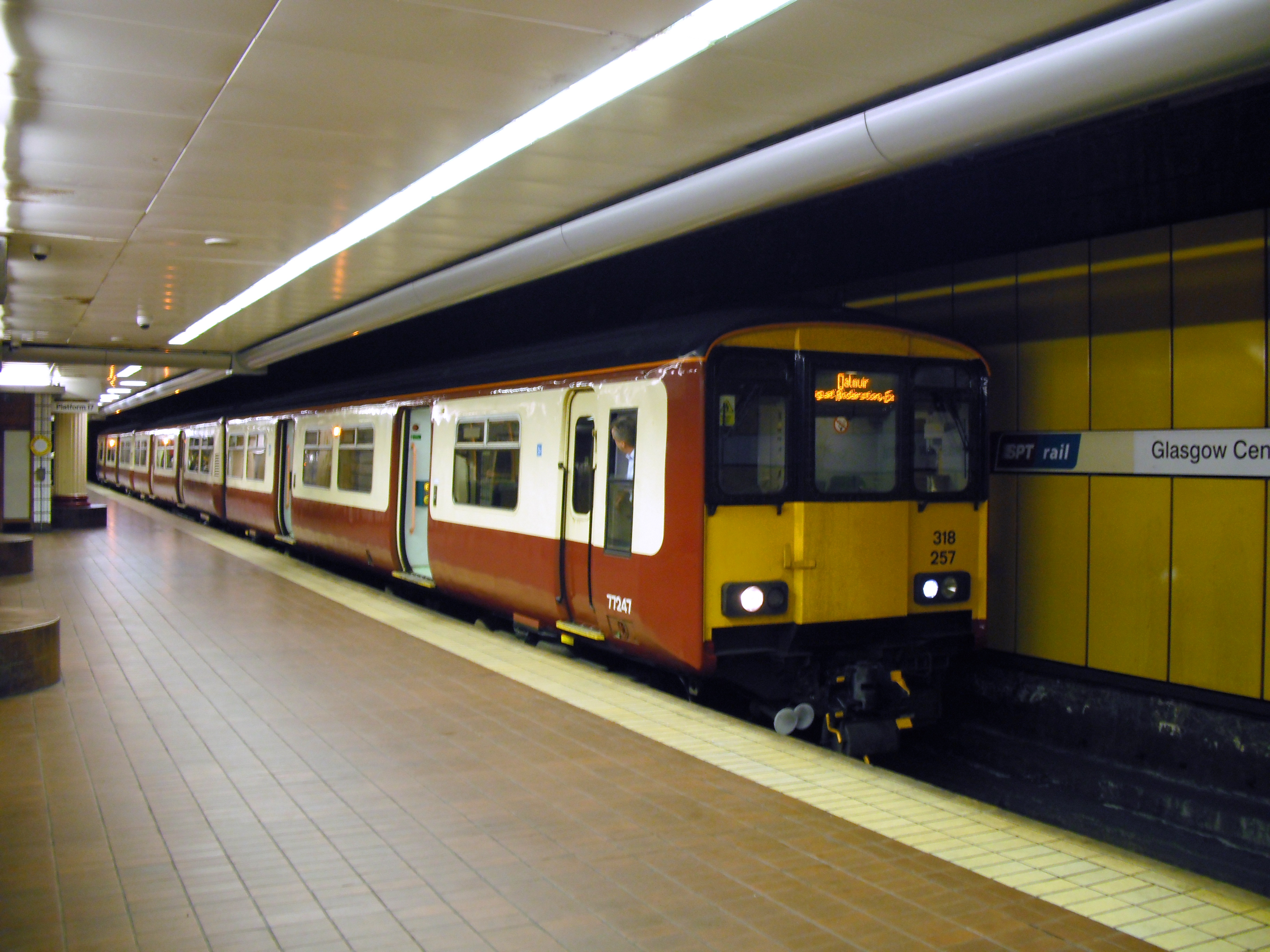
Class 318 with revised front end at Glasgow Central Low Level in 2011

Between 2005 and 2007, all Class 318s underwent a refurbishment by Hunslet-Barclay which involved the removal of the corridor connection on the driving cars allowing the provision of a full-width driver's cab. The passenger accommodation was also improved, with new passenger door controls, a repainted interior, new seat moquette and flooring, and new grab handles. New lighting was also fitted, with similar shades to the Class 320 units along with LED lights for cab indicators and marker lights. New passenger information systems, similar to those seen on other trains, were installed.

In September 2008 the Scottish Government's agency Transport Scotland announced that all ScotRail trains (including from the Strathclyde Partnership for Transport) would eventually be repainted in a new blue livery with white Saltire markings on the carriage ends. Since the units had recently been refurbished and repainted, they would be the last in the EMU fleet to be repainted in Saltire livery. In the interim, all units had their "SPT Rail" naming removed, leaving them with an unbranded SPT livery.

=== 2013-2017 ===
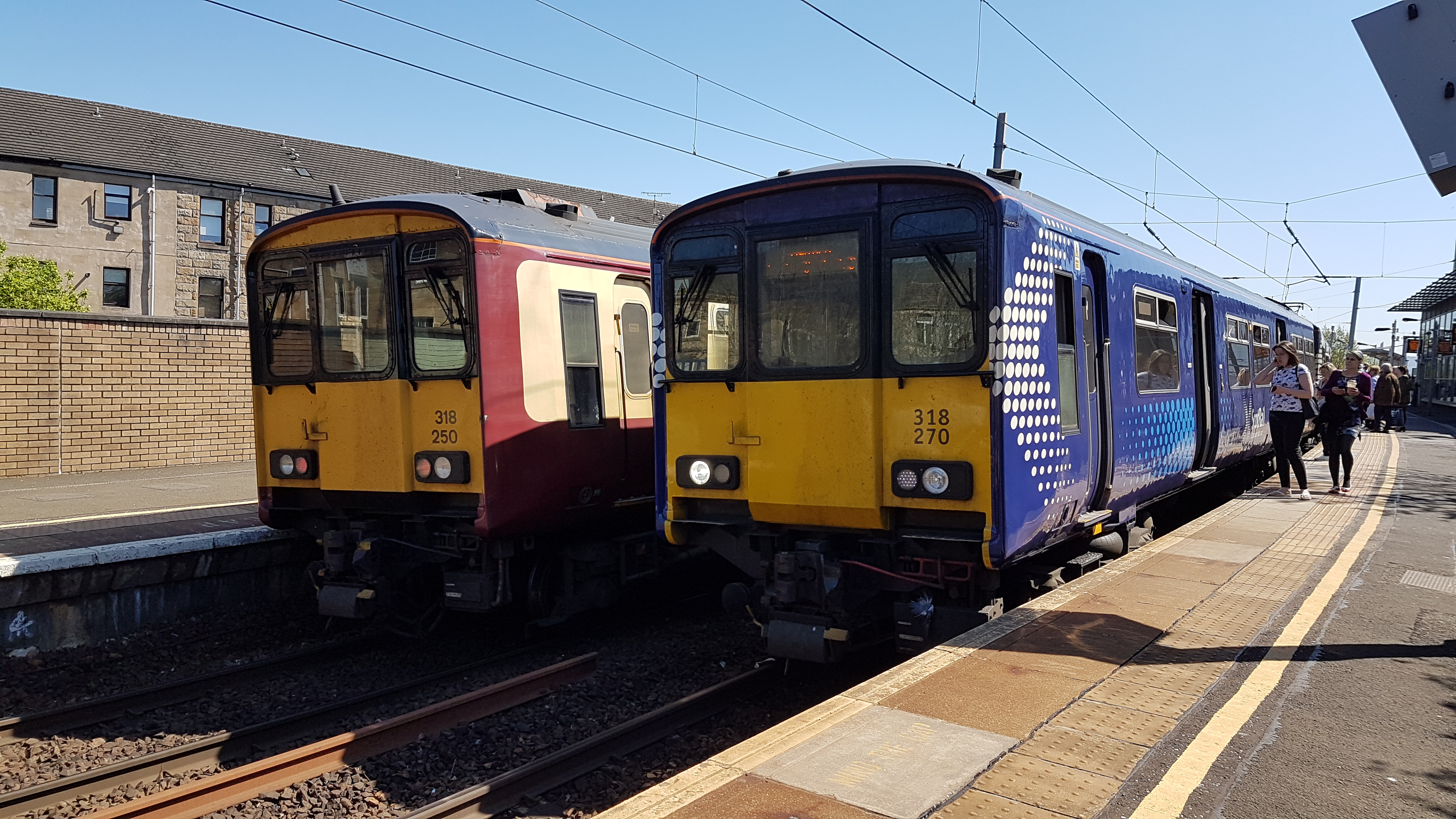
Two Class 318s stand at Partick station wearing both pre and post-refurbishment liveries in 2017.

The Class 318 units received a second refurbishment between October 2013 and October 2017.

The work included:

- Repainting into ScotRail saltire livery.
- An internal refurbishment that included an internal repaint, new floor vinyl and new blue 'saltire' seat coverings.
- Fluorescent lights replaced with LED lighting.
- New floor-level lighting in the door vestibules.
- Small toilet replaced with a large accessible toilet, as recently fitted to the Class 320 fleet.
- Corrosion repairs to bodywork (as the units generally operated on Ayrshire coast services initially, they were frequently exposed to sea water during inclement weather).

The refurbishment programme of the Class 318 fleet was completed in October 2017.

=== 2021-2023 ===
The Class 318 units received a third refurbishment between December 2021 and September 2023.

This work included:

- Repaint
- Overhaul of coupling equipment
- Door system
- Heating system
- Other critical safety work

== Fleet details ==
Class	Operator	Qty.	Year built	Cars per unit	Unit nos.
318	ScotRail	21	1985–1986	3	318250–318270

=== Vehicle numbering ===
Individual vehicles are numbered in the ranges as follows:

DTSOL	MSO	DTSO
77240–77259, 77288	62866–62885, 62890	77260–77279, 77289

=== Named units ===
Some units have received names:

- 318256 North Berwick Flyer 1850-2000
- 318259 Citizens Network
- 318266 Strathclyder
