= List of unused railways =

This is a list of unused railways, comprising railways and rail infrastructure on which some construction work took place but which were never used for revenue traffic as intended:

== Railways not operated ==
These are projects which failed completely, receiving no revenue traffic.

=== Australia ===
(Australia)

- Queensland Railways, Cooktown to Laura Railway Maytown Extension – line to Maytown goldfield, including Laura River Bridge, saw test train only 1888. The goldfield output was already failing.

=== Belgium ===
(Belgium)

- Charleroi Metro, Chatelet line – line from Waterloo to Leopold constructed in the 1980s. Completed and track laid to Centenaire but never opened.

=== Canada ===
(Canada)

Newfoundland

- Newfoundland Railway – branch lines from Northern Bight to Terranceville and from Deer Lake to Bonne Bay were abandoned uncompleted at the outbreak of the First World War in 1914.

Nova Scotia

- Blomidon Railway – began work to build a line from Wolfville to Cape Split in 1911, but ceased on the outbreak of the First World War in 1914.
- Chignecto Ship Railway – a portage railway was begun across the Isthmus of Chignecto in 1888, in lieu of a ship canal. Ships were to be pulled along it in cradles. The work was abandoned uncompleted in 1891.

Ontario

- Brockville and New York Bridge – this major project for a bridge over the Saint Lawrence River between Brockville and Morristown, New York, saw some construction in 1895-6, but little was achieved.
- Toronto Eastern Railway – construction began in 1910 for an electric railway from a connection with the Scarborough branch of the Toronto and York Radial Railway to Bowmanville and Cobourg. Whitby to Bowmanville was finished in 1913, but not opened. Pickering to Whitby was finished in 1923, then the whole project was abandoned in 1924 with only test trains having been run.

=== Eritrea ===
(Eritrea)

- Eritrean Railway, Teseney Line – extension from Bishia to Teseney begun 1932 was never finished, although later projected to Kassala, Sudan in 1940 after that area was briefly occupied by the Italians.

=== France ===
(France)

- Chemin de Fer Grand-Central de France – Ligne transcévenole. Begun 1911 to connect Le-Puy-en-Velay with Lalevade-d'Ardèche, ROW completed minus tracks to Monastier-sur-Gazeille in 1939 when war broke out, formal abandonment 1941.
- Chemins de fer de la Corse – see also: List of stations in Corsica
  - Caldaniccia – Propriano.
  - Porto-Vecchio – Bonifacio.
- Chemins de fer de l'Est – Col de Bussang Line had approximately 50% of an 8,287 m tunnel completed, work abandoned 1935.
- Chemin de fer de Lyon à Genève – line from Tenay to Hauteville-Lompnes Begun 1909, ROW almost completed, rails partially laid, inauguration train only when abandoned owing to lack of funds 1936.
- Chemins de fer du Midi:
  - Line from Beaumont-de-Lomagne to Gimont was begun in 1904, but work stopped just before completion in 1930 and it was never operated.
  - Line from Foix to Quillan was first proposed in 1884 from a junction at Gare de Saint-Paul-Saint-Antoine south of Foix. Work began in 1922 on the portion from there to Bélesta via Lavelanet, but was abandoned uncompleted in 1926. The line on to Quillan was not started.
  - Line from Gabarret to Eauze via Castéra-Verduzan was abandoned when almost completed in 1934.
  - Line from Hagetmau to Pau was begun in 1910, but work was abandoned in 1938.
  - Line from Saint-Girons to Oust was begun in 1881 as part of a scheme to build a railway over the Pyrenees to Lleida in Spain with a tunnel under the Port de Salau. Oust was intended as the customs post on the French side. The scheme received final approval in 1907, and the works to Oust completed in 1920. However, rails were only laid to Lacourt to serve a quarry by 1927. From Oust to the site of the tunnel's north portal no actual work was done, although land was purchased. The project was only completely abandoned in 1954.
  - The line from Auch to Lannemezan was authorised following a government report of 1909 and is shown as a proposed line in a map of the lines of the Chemins de fer du Midi on the wall of the booking hall of the station Bordeaux-Saint-Jean. Constructed between the two world wars, the line was nearly complete in 1941 but was then declassified and abandoned. Three tunnels, the abutments of the viaduct of Larroque and some other bridges still remain.
- Chemins de fer de Paris à Lyon et à la Méditerranée – line from Chorges to Barcelonnette was begun in 1909, but abandoned in 1935 despite major engineering works having been entered into. Stations at Le Sauze, Ubaye, Le Lauzet, Le Martinet, Revel-Méolans, Thuiles and Barcelonnette. The last-named town was one of few in France which never had a railway. Much of the route has been drowned by a reservoir.
- Chemin de fer de Paris à Orléans – line from Cahors to Moissac was under construction between 1879 and 1934, but never finished.

=== Greece ===
(Greece)

- Kalambaka—Kozani—Veria line (197 km): normal gauge line begun 1927 and abandoned 1932. Completion of 63 km, partial completion of 48 km. Stations completed: Mourgani (demolished), Oxynia, Xiropotamos, Aghiofyllo, Karpero, Karvounis, Mikro, Kalochi, Mikroklisoura, Pasagefyri, Siatista (demolished), Xirolimni (demolished), Vatero (demolished), Asomata. 20 tunnels were completed. Work abandoned owing to 1930's crisis.
- Thessaloniki to Tsagezi Line – less than 5% of about 150 km completed, work abandoned owing to World War II (1940).

=== Ireland ===
(Republic of Ireland)

- Bray and Enniskerry Railway – An electric railway was begun between Bray, County Wicklow and Enniskerry in 1900, and almost completed before being abandoned in 1910.

=== Italy ===
(Italy) Because much of the Italian railway network was promoted and paid for by government authority, the abandonment of uncompleted lines often had a political dimension.

- Emilia-Romagna:
  - Ferrovia Modena–Pavullo – narrow gauge line begun 1914 and abandoned 1938. Stations built at Serramazzoni and Pavullo nel Frignano. Work stopped at the latter place, but the original intention was to go on to Formigine.
  - Ferrovia Rolo-Mirandola – under construction from 1922 to 1935. Ran from Rolo to Mirandola, with stations at Novi di Modena, Moglia, Concordia sulla Secchia and San Possidonio. Part of the formation was taken for a new station at Mirandola in 1964.
- Friuli:
  - A small network of electric lines in progress between the world wars, but none of it was completed:
    - Ferrovia Bertiolo-Palmanova-Savogna – line between Bertiolo and existing station at Savogna d'Isonzo. Stations: Talmassons, Castions di Strada (junction with Ferrovia Udine-Castions di Strada), Gonars, Palmanova (already open, proposed junction), Jalmicco-San Vito al Torre, Medea, Mariano-Romans and Farra-Gradisca Provesano.
    - Ferrovia Teglio Veneto-Bertiolo-Udine – line between existing stations at Teglio Veneto and Udine. Stations: Teglio-Suzzolins, Morsano al Tagliamento, Madrisio, Varmo-Rivignano, Bertiolo (junction with Ferrovia Bertiolo-Palmanova-Savogna), Sclaunicco, Pozzuolo del Friuli and Campoformido.
    - Ferrovia Udine-Castions di Strada – line from Udine to Castions di Strada. Stations: Pozzuolo del Friuli and Mortegliano.
  - Ferrovia Cormons-Redipuglia – A freight bypass line for Gorizia but a passenger service was intended from Cormons to Redipuglia, with stations at Mariano del Friuli and Gradisca Borgo Trevisan. Work began 1949, and was abandoned 1989.
  - Ferrovia Udine-Majano – a line from Udine to Majano, begun 1914 and abandoned 1932. Stations: Colugna-Rizzi, Feletto Umberto, Pagnacco, Fontanabona, Colloredo di Monte Albano, Vendoglio, Treppo, Buja and Avilla-Santo Stefano.
- Piedmont:
  - Ferrovia Bivio Orba-Cantalupo-Felizzano – a suburban line for Alessandria, begun 1939 from Felizzano to Cantalupo and diverging to Bivio Orba and Alessandria Smistamento, abandoned unfinished 1966.
- Rome:
  - Cintura Nord – an attempt to provide Rome with a northern orbital railway, running from Roma San Pietro railway station to Roma Nomentana railway station. Work was in progress between 1913 and 1931. Stations were to have been at Prati di Castello, Ponte Milvio and Salario.
- Sicily:
  - Ferriovia Bronte-Cuccovia – line from Bronte to an obscure location called Cuccovia.
  - Ferrovia Caltanissetta-Misteci - an unfinished mineral branch of 5 km, from Caltanissetta south to Misteci, work abandoned 1927 when the mine was closed.
  - Ferrovia Canicattì-Caltagirone - narrow gauge from Canicatti to San Michele di Ganzaria to serve sulphur mines, work was done on the portion to Riesi but from there to San Michele no construction was undertaken. Work had begun in 1906, and was only formally abandoned in the Fifties.
  - Ferrovia Leonforte-Nicosia - a narrow gauge railway from Leonforte to the small cathedral city of Nicosia was under construction between 1921 and 1929, and was almost finished when abandoned. Station buildings exist for Bivio Paternò, Rocca Vutura, Villadoro, Sperlinga (request stop) and the terminus at Nicosia.
  - Ferrovia Palermo-Salaparuta - a narrow gauge line from Palermo to Salaparuta via Monreale, begun 1926 and effectively abandoned (although not officially) in the early Fifties. Construction work beyond Camporeale did not begin.
  - Ferrovia Salemi-Kaggera - narrow gauge from Salemi to Kaggera (now known as Calatafimi-Segesta with stations at Salemi-Città, Vita and Calatafimi-Città. Work abandoned 1921.
  - Ferrovia Santo Stefano di Camastra-Reitano-Mistretta - a narrow gauge line begun from Santo Stefano di Camastra to Mistretta via Reitano. Construction took place in the 1920s.

=== Mexico ===
(Mexico)

- Peninsular Railway of Lower California – the Mexican Land and Colonization Company was a British firm which obtained a concession to settle English wheat farmers in Baja California, and which began the enterprise in 1891 with a base at San Quintin. Baja California is semi-desert, and the venture was a disaster. A network of railroads had been planned, and a start made on a line from San Quintin to Ensenada and Tijuana. 27 km (17 mi) of this was finished, ending at a place called San Ramón.

=== United Kingdom ===
(United Kingdom)

- Ashby and Nuneaton Joint Railway – Hinckley Branch. This railway was jointly owned by the rival London and North Western Railway and Midland Railway. The scheme included a line from Stoke Golding to Hinckley which was finished in 1872. The partners could not agree as to how to use it, so it was never used and abandoned.
- Birmingham and Oxford Junction Railway, Duddeston Junction Chord – Duddeston Viaduct was built 1846 to allow trains of the Great Western Railway to run into the Birmingham New Street station of the London and North Western Railway. The two companies were at enmity, so no such train ever ran.
- Blackpool Railway – 1884 authorised to build from the West Lancashire Railway at Preston to Lytham, then directly to a main station at Blackpool Church Street and a terminus at Norbreck. Purchased much land, but did little before abandonment in 1901.
- Cleveland Extension Mineral Railway – started 1874, abandoned 1896. From Moorholme on the Cleveland Railway to ironworks at Glaisdale. Nicknamed after its contractor, Paddy Waddell.
- Cromarty and Dingwall Light Railway – started 1902, abandoned 1914 on outbreak of war. About six miles were completed at the Cromarty end by 1914. Rails laid were scavenged for the war effort. Improvements in road transport discouraged resumption.
- Dawlish Avoiding Line
- Didcot, Newbury and Southampton Railway- Independent line from Winchester to Southampton Royal Pier. Work started in Southampton area in 1882 where sections of embankment were built and work started on bridge over LSWR line. Later a separate station (Winchester Chesil) was built and connection into LSWR line built at Shawford.
- East Kent Light Railway An extension from Wingham (Canterbury Road) to Canterbury was approved in 1920 but only a short section of cutting was constructed. Another extension from Sandwich Road to Richborough Port was built in 1926 but opening to passenger trains was refused due to condition of a bridge. A passenger station at Richborough Port was built but never opened.
- East London Railway – Whitechapel to Bethnal Green goods line. Work on the tunnel for this began in 1866, but was abandoned for lack of funds.
- Great Western Railway, Fishguard Ocean Port – new main line from Letterston to a proposed ocean liner port at Fishguard Harbour. Authorised 1903, this portion begun 1912, abandoned 1914 on outbreak of First World War. The proposed harbour was too small for the larger liners being built after the war.
- Great Western Railway, Windsor and Ascot Railway – from Windsor & Eton Central to Ascot, was begun in 1892 with the purchase and fencing of land and some minor works, but the rival London and South Western Railway prevented a junction for through traffic and improved its own services. The GWR did not proceed with the scheme.
- Lastingham and Rosedale Light Railway – began construction in 1902 but achieved little.
- Horsham and Guildford Direct Railway, Itchingfield South Fork – the hope was that this railway from Guildford to Horsham would be part of a Reading to Brighton route. Hence a triangular junction was provided at Itchingfield to allow direct running to Shoreham-by-Sea, but the London, Brighton and South Coast Railway was only interested in providing a local service and the rails on the south fork were removed two years after opening, in 1867.
- Latimer Road and Acton Railway – construction began 1882 on a line from Latimer Road station on the Metropolitan Railway' in London to Acton. Works abandoned 1900.
- Liskeard and Caradon Railway – work on an extension to Launceston, Cornwall was begun in 1884, and remains of the abandoned works are easily traced near Kilmar Tor.
- Leeds and York Railway, Tadcaster to Copmanthorpe Line – started 1846, abandoned 1849 (part subsequently used as a goods siding to a textile mill). The work included the so-called Virgin Viaduct.
- London, Brighton and South Coast Railway, Ouse Valley Railway – was started 1866 in order to defend territory from possible rival schemes. Work was abandoned 1867 after the threat had lifted. Proposed from south of Ouse Valley Viaduct north of Haywards Heathto Hailsham via Uckfield. Substantial remains between the Ouse Valley Viaduct to north of Haywards Heath also west of Uckfield.
- London, Chatham and Dover Railway, London to Crystal Palace – the London, Chatham and Dover Railway (LCDR) relied on the West End of London and Crystal Palace Railway on creation in 1859, but built its own line to London Victoria from Penge Junction near Kent House in 1861. The LCDR initially planned a competing service to Crystal Palace so the junction was triangular, but the route was circuitous and so the north to south curve was never used.
- London Underground, Edgware to Bushey Heath – started 1938 work suspended 1940 and officially abandoned 1953. Extension of the London Underground Northern Line with intermediate stations at Brockley Hill and Elstree South. Earthworks between Edgware and Brockley Hill were nearly complete when abandoned. Work on tunnel at Elstree was partially built, carriage depot at Aldenham was built during World War 2 became a munitions factory and subsequently bus overhaul works. Between Edgware and Brockley Hill the area is now covered by housing development with little evidence of the railway. At Brockley Hill a few remains of the viaduct for the station still remain as at 2019. The tunnel entrance at Elstree has been filled in. The carriage depot at Aldenham has been demolished.
- Mid Suffolk Light Railway, Construction of line from Kenton to Westerfield was started and completed to Debenham where some goods trains ran but subsequently abandoned. Remainder of the route never constructed. Also extension from Laxfield to Halesworth was constructed as far as Cratfield which was used by goods trains until 1952. Work on section between Cratfield and Halesworth was started at Halesworth end but subsequently abandoned.
- Midland and Great Northern Joint Railway, Sutton Bridge Dock – a ship dock with lock-gates at Sutton Bridge was opened in 1881, served by a branch of the railway. It failed structurally as soon as it was filled.
- Mistley, Thorpe and Walton Railway – proposed from Mistley on the Great Eastern Railway to Thorpe-le-Soken, construction began 1863 and was abandoned 1869 with earthworks surviving.
- Monnow Valley Railway – began work 1866 on a line from Monmouth to Pontrilas, but only finished a tunnel at the former place.
- Neath and Brecon Railway, Devynock & Sennybridge to Llangammarch Branch – earthworks and fence-lines are apparent along the Cilieni valley to the summit of the line at about 310m about sea level near the MOD simulated German village 'Cilieni' just south of Tirabad. This is over half the length of the line. The route would have had a major bridge over the River Usk and a tunnel just north of Sennybridge to gain access to the Cilieni valley and would have made Llangammarch Wells a junction with the Central Wales route of the London and North Western Railway. Work stopped on 9/9/1867 due to the bankruptcy of the contractor John Dickson, who also built the Neath and Brecon Railway.
- Newport Pagnell Railway, Olney Extension – from Newport Pagnell to Olney of the Wolverton to Newport Pagnell branch line. Work started in 1865 and stopped the following year, as many railway mania schemes did at this time when the bank financing these speculative schemes, Overend, Gurney and Company, collapsed. Various partially complete cuttings and embankments can be seen along the line of route as far north as Emberton and are visible on old maps. Had the line been completed, Olney would have become a junction of the Northampton St Johns-Bedford line.
- North Eastern Railway, Collywell Bay Branch Line – was an electrified railway finished in 1914, just in time for the First World War. It never saw a train.
- Northern Counties Union Railway – 1846 began lines from Penrith to Thirsk and Tebay to Bishop Auckland, crossing at Kirkby Stephen. A line from Bedale on the former to Melverley railway station on the Leeds and Thirsk Railway was begun, with work underway between Burneston and Melverley. A cutting survives at Sinderby; south of this place, the route was later taken by the Leeds Northern Railway to Northallerton.
- Trentham, Newcastle-under-Lyme and Silverdale Light Railway – begun in 1914 from the North Staffordshire Railway's Trentham Park branch line to Silverdale via the Pool Dam branch. Only a bridge was built over the present A34 before work was abandoned.
- North West Central Railway – begun 1890 as a trunk line from the Midland Railway and the Queensbury lines of the Great Northern Railway at Keighley to the West Lancashire Railway at Preston, Lancashire via Colne, with connections to Southport and, via the Liverpool, Southport and Preston Junction Railway and the Cheshire Lines Committee, Liverpool. Work was abandoned 1893.
- Picc-Vic Line – an underground rapid transit railway was proposed for Manchester in 1971, connecting the main railway termini of Manchester Piccadilly and Manchester Victoria. Despite not being authorised, work was done on it under the Arndale Centre before cancellation in 1977.
- Pilmoor, Boroughbridge and Knaresborough Railway – at Pilmoor a bridge was built over the Great Northern Railway main line in 1875 to create a route from Leeds to Pickering and Whitby avoiding York. It was never used.
- Portsmouth Railway, Peasmarsh Curve – a main line chord was built from Shalford to Peasmarsh north of Farncombe to allow services from Portsmouth to London via Redhill and the South Eastern Railway. The rival London and South Western Railway took over the line, and the chord never saw a train.
- Reading, Guildford and Reigate Railway, Frimley Curve – opened 1849 by the South Eastern Railway, with an east to north spur at its crossing of the London and South Western Railway (LSWR) main line to Southampton. This was to give a route from London to Wokingham, but the companies were hostile, the spur was never used and the LSWR built its own line to the town.
- Ruthin and Cerrig-y-Drudion Railway – a 2 ft (610 mm) gauge railway partially built from Ruthin towards a junction with the never started North Wales Narrow Gauge Railways Beddgelert-Corwen route at Cerrig-y-Drudion. The line crossed the Clocaenog Forest hills with a summit tunnel at Pennant before crossing the Afon Alwen and a second summit at about 340m following the B5105 into Cerrig-y-Drudion. There is evidence of construction along the south side of the Afon Clywedog valley between Rhewl and Bontuchel where work ceased on failure of the contractor 1884.
- St Germans and Looe Railway
- Seaforth and Sefton Junction Railway – authorised 1903 to provide a link between Sefton and Maghull on the Southport and Cheshire Lines Extension Railway of the Cheshire Lines Committee and the Seaforth Sands terminus of the Liverpool Overhead Railway. The company never laid a rail, yet was one of the operating railway companies grouped into the London, Midland and Scottish Railway by the Railways Act 1921. The larger company showed no interest in further work.
- Southern Railway, Chessington South to Leatherhead – started 1938, abandoned 1939. Extension of the Motspur Park to Chessington South branch to Leatherhead. Work suspended due to outbreak of World War II and then abandoned due to the Town and Country Planning Act 1947. Embankment built for about half mile south of Chessington South including one overbridge. Land purchased and the route fenced through Ashtead Common. Land reserved for the railway through Leatherhead was subsequently used for M25. Stations at Rushett and Leatherhead Common were intended.
- Southern Heights Light Railway, Sanderstead to Orpington – authorised in 1928 abandoned 1931 although work continued in conjunction with the new railway to complete the reopening the closed Woodside to Selsdon line which was reopened in 1935. Only actual construction was at Orpington an embankment built for planned dive under the main line. Route reserved for construction until abandonment.
- Trent Valley Railway, Tamworth East to North Curve – built 1847 to allow direct trains from London to Burton upon Trent via the Birmingham and Derby Junction Railway. The TVR went to the London and North Western Railway, the BDJR to the Midland Railway and their rivalry meant that the curve was never used.
- Waterloo and Whitehall Railway – a self-contained underground rapid transit line at London, under construction between 1865 and 1870. Trains were to be operated by the pneumatic system, that is, to be pushed by artificial air pressure. Money ran out when the tubes had already been constructed.
- Wrexham, Mold and Connah's Quay Railway, Hope West to North Curve – built a north to west curve at Hope Exchange in 1862 to give the town of Mold direct access to the port of Connah's Quay. No rails were laid.

=== United States ===
The railroad history of the United States is marked by many companies which began construction work but never completed any of it. For example, the Panic of 1873 interrupted the construction of a number of railroads, several of which were never resumed. The published evidence for these abortive railroads is poor, and available citations are often lacking.

==== Alabama ====
- Birmingham, Chattanooga and Atlanta Railroad – it was on official record as an operating railroad only in 1901, so had laid some track. There would never be a direct line from Birmingham to Gadsden, the terminus of the Tennessee, Alabama and Georgia Railway from Chattanooga.
- Florence Northern Railroad – began a line in 1890 from Florence, Alabama, to Dover, Tennessee, and graded 27 miles northwards from the former place. The route was just west of the Louisville and Nashville Railroad. Another attempt was made by the Mineral Belt Railroad in 1906, which began work in 1917 and abandoned it in 1924.
- Memphis Branch Railroad – began a narrow gauge line from Rome, Georgia, to Gadsden in 1873, but abandoned 1877 without having run a revenue service. Not to be confused with a progenitor of the Rome Railroad.
- Mobile and Pensacola Railway and Navigation – began an electric interurban from Volanta in Fairhope to Lillian near Pensacola, Florida, in 1919. This would have linked to a ferry from Mobile. Work was abandoned in 1922.

==== Alaska ====
- Council City and Solomon River Railroad – attempted to build a line from a proposed port on the Solomon river estuary to Council City (now a ghost town). Begun 1903, abandoned unfinished 1907, and the locomotives and rolling stock were dumped in situ.

==== Arizona ====
- American-Mexican Pacific Railway – incorporated 1905 to build a 2,000-mile (3,200 km) system of trunk lines west from Phoenix to Los Angeles and San Diego, and south-east into Mexico via Florence, Tucson and Nogales with a branch from Canoa south of Tucson to Naco. Began work on the line from Phoenix to Naco but opened nothing. Some of the routes were later occupied by Southern Pacific Railroad lines.
- Arizona Mineral Belt Railroad – 1883 laid 35 miles of track south of Flagstaff with the intention of getting to Globe. Began boring a tunnel through the Mogollon Rim.
- Arizona Narrow Gauge Railroad – began construction of a line from Tucson to Globe in 1882, built 10 miles to Magee Road, graded another 20 miles, never operated despite re-incorporating as the Tucson, Globe and Northern Railroad in 1887.

==== Arkansas ====
- Kansas City, Bentonville and Southeastern Railroad – 1891 began construction from Bentonville northwards in the direction of Neosho, Missouri, via Pineville, Missouri, but the substantial grading never crossed the state line.
- St Louis, Arkansas and Pacific Railroad - 1913 registered with the Interstate Commerce Commission as an operating railroad with 16 miles (26 km) of track. Never had revenue service. Was building its first segment from Pontiac, Missouri, to Fallsville via Jasper, with a branch from the latter to Harrison. Intended a trunk line from St Louis to Paris, Texas.
- Yellville-Rush and Mineral Belt Railroad - began a narrow-gauge line from Yellville to Rush in 1915 but was unable to complete it.

==== California ====
- California Central Narrow Gauge Railway – began in Solano County in 1873, to build from Benicia to Tehama with an extension to Red Bluff. A small amount of construction commenced but the project was abandoned in 1874.
- Monterey and Fresno Railroad - was reported to the Interstate Commerce Commission as an operating railroad from 1897 to 1899, so had completed some track. Construction attempted from a pier at Monterey to Fresno via Hollister. The pier was begun, and the line graded to Salinas.
- Owens River Valley Electric Railway - from Laws on the Carson and Colorado Railway to Bishop. The grade was finished in 1911, but no rails were laid.

==== Colorado ====
- Denver Railway and Telegraph Company built a narrow-gauge railroad to the Lookout Mountain from Denver in 1890, but failed to complete or open it despite being listed as an operating railroad company by the Interstate Commerce Commission until 1898.
- Plateau Valley Railroad – attempted in 1913 to build from the Denver and Rio Grande Western Railroad near Grand Junction to Collbran. The junction location on the DRGW is still called Yeckel Junction.

==== Connecticut ====
- Danbury and Harlem Traction Company – spent ten years from 1901 to 1910 constructing an electric rapid-transit interurban railroad from Danbury, Connecticut, to the New York Central Railroad station at Goldens Bridge, New York, on the Harlem Line. Tracks were laid from a connection with the Danbury and Bethel Street Railway near the Danbury Fairgrounds, west through Ridgebury and just across the state line to North Salem, New York. Grading reached Goldens Bridge before the project was abandoned.
- Ridgefield and New York Railroad – began 1867 to build a line from just east of Port Chester, New York, to Ridgefield. It was almost completely graded when the Panic of 1873 stopped work. The company survived, and was trying to finish and extend to Danbury up to 1906 when the New York, New Haven and Hartford Railroad bought it out to get rid of it.

==== Delaware ====
- Delaware Electric Traction – began 1900 on a line from Smyrna via Leipsic to Dover and Milford with a branch to Woodland Beach. Abandoned when almost finished 1906, after having bought ten passenger cars for operation.

==== Georgia ====
- Gainesville and Dahlonega Railroad – began a narrow gauge line between Gainesville and Dahlonega, Georgia, in 1878, became the Gainesville and Dahlonega Electric Railway in 1905 and went bankrupt in 1909. Completed the line to the Chattahoochee River and left earthworks northwards, but never ran a public service.

==== Illinois ====
- Cairo and St Louis Railway – never finished any part of its proposed interurban electric line from St Louis to Cairo, but electrified a branch of the Illinois Central Railroad from Mounds to Mound City and connected it at the latter place with Cairo's little streetcar system, from 1910.
- Chicago, Millington and Western Railroad – began in 1872 to build a narrow-gauge railroad from Chicago to Muscatine, Iowa, via Warrenville, Millington, Princeton and Neponset. It finished 11 miles (18 km) in Chicago, from 22nd and Ashland along Blue Island Avenue and 26th Street before going bankrupt in 1877. The Chicago, Burlington and Quincy Railroad bought the line and scavenged most of the track, although about a mile became most of its Canalport loop.
- Decatur and State Line Railway - 1869 began a line from Decatur to a connection with the Chicago, Rock Island and Pacific Railroad at Moneka east of Joliet, giving Decatur a direct route to Chicago. Claimed to have finished grading in 1872. Bridge piers are extant in the Kankakee River at Kankakee River State Park.
- Evansville, Mount Carmel and Olney Electric Railway - began work on a line from Mount Carmel to Olney via Lancaster in 1910. Proposed a line from Mount Carmel to Evansville.

==== Indiana ====
This state had a high number of interurban electric railway proposals, many of which began construction.

- Covington and Southwestern Railroad – began 1909 to build an interurban from Covington to Crawfordsville, and finished most of the grading. Four miles (6.4 km) of track were laid at Kingman, and one trip ran for shareholders. One of the promoters then absconded with the company's funds.
- Fort Wayne and Toledo Electric Railway - began 1909 to build an interurban from Fort Wayne to Bryan, Ohio, to connect with the Toledo and Indiana Railway to Toledo, Ohio. Graded from Fort Wayne to Harlan.
- Indianapolis, Huntington, Columbia City and Northwestern Railway - began an interurban line 1907 from Indianapolis through Marion, Huntington, Columbia City and Syracuse to Goshen. Grading was completed between Goshen and Syracuse.
- Madison and Indianapolis Railroad - had a very steep incline out of Madison, and in 1852 began work on a better replacement line to the east. The company went bankrupt, and work ceased. Remains are in Clifty Falls State Park.
- South Bend and Logansport Traction - began grading work in 1909 at Plymouth on an interurban line from South Bend to Logansport.
- Terre Haute, Merom and Southwestern Traction - graded 15 miles (24 km) of an interurban line between Terre Haute and Merom by 1909, and laid two miles (3.2 km) of track.
- Vincennes, West Baden and Louisville Traction - graded between Vincennes and Monroe City in 1909 on an interurban line to Petersburg, Jasper, West Baden and Louisville, Kentucky.
- Wabash and Rochester Electric Railway - graded between Wabash and Rochester in 1906, and proposed to build to Celina, Ohio, via Montpelier and Geneva.

==== Kansas ====
- Kansas Southern Electric Railroad – obtained the little Iola Electric Railway from Iola to La Harpe and set out to build from Iola to Girard via Chanute, Erie and Greenbush. Failed to complete.
- Nebraska, Kansas and Southern Railroad – proposed a trunk line in 1907 from Hastings, Nebraska, to Amarillo, Texas, via Stockton, Kansas, and Garden City, Kansas, 507 miles (816 km). Built 12.6 miles (20.3 km) from Garden City northeast to Ottograf, and graded 6 miles (9.7 km) from there to Churchill. These places don't exist anymore. Rails scavenged for the Garden City Western Railway in 1915.
- Topeka, Westmoreland and Marysville Railroad – begun 1889, to run from Topeka to Marysville and Odell, Nebraska, via Westmoreland. Built 5 miles (8.0 km) and was abandoned in 1893.

==== Louisiana ====
- Vicksburg, Alexandria and Southern Railroad – tried 1914 to build from the St. Louis, Iron Mountain and Southern Railway at Camp Stafford near Alexandria to Vidalia, and was listed by the Interstate Commerce Commission as an operating railroad 1915-17 so had laid track. Grade at Alexandria was appropriated by the Tioga Gravel Company as a quarry spur.

==== Maryland ====
- Elkton and Middletown Railroad – 1895 attempt by the Pennsylvania Railroad to give its Delmarva Peninsula lines better access from the Washington direction with a cut-off from Elkton to Middletown. The company had a monopoly on the peninsula, and decided that it couldn't be bothered to short-haul itself. Only a half-mile spur at Elkton was built.

==== Massachusetts ====
- Hampden Railroad – began 1910 on a line from the Boston and Maine Railroad at Bondsville and the New York, New Haven and Hartford Railroad at Springfield. It was completed, but never saw a train.
- Lancaster Railroad – completed 1872 from Hudson to Lancaster to give the latter place a direct route to Boston. It never saw a revenue train.
- Lee and New Haven Railroad – began 1872 to construct from the New York, New Haven and Hartford Railroad at New Hartford to Lee, via New Boston and Otis. Substantially complete when abandoned. A separate but affiliated company, the Lee and Hudson Railroad graded from Lee to West Stockbridge.
- Southern New England Railway – this trunk line was to run from the Central Vermont Railway at Palmer to Providence, Rhode Island, in order to make the latter place an ice-free port for Canadian traffic in addition to the inadequate New London, Connecticut, where the CVR terminated. Construction was abandoned in 1914, leaving substantial remains.

==== Michigan ====
- Grand Rapids and Northwestern Railroad began 1908 to build a trunk line from Grand Rapids to a new car ferry port at Ludington to compete with the well-established one run by the Pere Marquette Railway. Car ferries would have sailed directly to Milwaukee, and the new road would have connected with the New York Central Railroad system at Grand Rapids. The defunct Mason and Oceana Railroad was bought to serve as a contractor's line, but only some grading was done.
- Iron Range and Huron Bay Railroad – constructed a line from Champion, near the Lake Michigamme ore fields, to a new ore dock on Huron Bay, part of Lake Huron. Finished in 1892, but never saw a revenue train.

==== Minnesota ====
- Little Falls and Southern Railroad – began 1894 to build from Little Falls to Albany, but ended up as a mile-long freight spur owned by the Northern Pacific Railway at the former place.
- Twin City and Lake Superior Railway – proposed a heavy-rail electric line from Minneapolis to Duluth, and had graded 5 miles from the former place by 1916.

==== Missouri ====
- Lexington, Lake and Gulf Railroad – 1872 graded from Lexington to south of Butler via Odessa and Pleasant Hill. From Pleasant Hill to Butler the route was later to be used by the Missouri Pacific Railroad, however, the original rights of way were so entangled in liens and claims, the Missouri Pacific opted to lay a parallel set of rails, alongside the original right of way. The destination was to have been Fort Scott, Kansas.
- Missouri, Inland and Southern Railway 1909, Missouri, Arkansas and Gulf Railway 1911, Rolla, Ozark and Southern Railway 1914. The first graded from Rolla to Houston via Licking, the second tried to go on to Willow Springs and the last tried to open only from Rolla to Anutt. Nothing was achieved.
- Louisiana and Missouri River Railroad 1870, graded from Mexico Missouri through Harrisburg Missouri through to Fayette and Franklin Missouri. It was planned to serve the now abandoned coal mines Near Harrisburg MO. and mines northwest of Harrisburg near Fayette. The grading was complete and several trestles were in various states of construction with at least one complete. Rail had begun to be laid down when the line was abandoned for one further to the north which is still in operation by CP/KCS.https://www.columbiatribune.com/story/lifestyle/around-town/2013/05/03/harrisburg-has-history-all-its/21654623007/

==== New Jersey ====
- Caldwell Railroad – founded 1869 to build a line between Montclair and Caldwell, and construction began in 1872. However, work ceased owing to the inability to complete a tunnel under Montclair and nearby Verona. About 2,000 feet (610 m) of the tunnel was left uncompleted.
- Pennsylvania Railroad – Pennsylvania and Newark Railroad was a freight cutoff begun in 1907 from Morrisville, Pennsylvania, to Colonia, New Jersey. This was a continuation eastwards of the successful Trenton Cutoff. Some work was done in the Trenton area, including bridge piers in the Delaware River. Construction suspended 1916.
- Pennsylvania Railroad – Westville Cutoff was begun 1906 as a freight belt line for Camden from Westville to West Haddonfield. This was substantially complete with some track laid when the PRR abandoned it to save money in 1908.
- Trenton, Lakewoood and Seacoast Railway – began 1910 to build an electric interurban from Point Pleasant to the Hamilton Square line of the Trenton streetcar system, via Lakewood, Imlaystown and Allentown. Graded from Point Pleasant Traction terminus at Pine Bluff to Lakewood, and laid track to Brick Township. Never ran a train.

==== New Mexico ====
- Albuquerque Eastern Railway – began 1909 on a line from Albuquerque through the Tijeras Canyon to Moriarty with a branch to coal mines at Hagan. Work was abandoned unfinished. Hagan did obtain a railroad, the Rio Grande Eastern Railroad, but that arrived from the north-west.
- Northern New Mexico and Gulf Railroad – 1905 began construction between Española and Abiquiu. Proposed to the north-west corner of the state.
- Santa Fe, Liberal and Englewood Railroad – promoted by mine owners at Raton, New Mexico, 1907, to run from the Santa Fe, Raton and Des Moines Railroad at Des Moines to Woodward, Oklahoma, via Liberal, Kansas, and Englewood, Kansas. This was partly graded in 1907. In 1914, it had 0.75 miles (1.21 km) of track, and in 1920 it was abandoned.

==== New York ====
New York State is a hot-spot for unfinished railroads.

- Brookfield Railroad – began 1888 to build a short line railroad between North Brookfield and Brookfield, New York, but failed after grading the route.
- Buffalo, Attica and Arcade Railroad - this predecessor of the Arcade and Attica Railroad tried to build a line to Buffalo from Java Center in 1902, which was to be electrified. Work stopped when the Buffalo and Susquehanna Railroad bought out the company in 1904.
- Buffalo Extension of the Atlantic and Great Western Railroad - 1865 was building from Randolph to Buffalo but opened nothing.
- Delaware Railroad - 1898 did some work on an electric line from Delhi to Andes with a branch to Bovina Center. The company still existed in 1903 -the name was as given, not Delaware Valley Railroad.
- Dunderberg Spiral Railway - an amusement railroad on Dunderberg Mountain, powered by gravity and abandoned unfinished in 1891.
- Elizabethtown Terminal Railroad - finished grading a short line from Westport to Elizabethtown 1909, but never laid tracks.
- Hudson Suspension Bridge and New England Railway - the Hudson Highland Suspension Bridge was a failed predecessor of the Bear Mountain Bridge, begun in 1868 but major construction only after 1888. The main line was to have been from Harriman in the direction of Danbury, Connecticut. Work on the pier foundations and a tunnel through Bull Hill was abandoned only in 1916.
- Long Island Boynton Bicycle Railroad - after a successful demonstration under steam of the Boynton Bicycle Railroad monorail system at Coney Island, in 1894 a demonstration electric line was built between Bellport and East Patchogue as the first section of a proposed suburban system on Long Island. Nothing further was achieved.
- Monticello, Fallsburg and White Lake Railroad – began 1900 to build an electric interurban from Fallsburg to White Lake via Monticello. Abandoned unfinished, after substantial grading and several bridges erected.
- New York Richfield Springs and Cooperstown Railroad - 1883 graded a line from Fort Plain to Richfield Springs but went bankrupt before laying track.
- Ogdensburg, Clayton and Rome Railroad - 1853 began work on a line from Rome to Ogdensburg closely parallel to, and to the west of, the Black River and Utica Railroad (BR&U). Work abandoned 1856, and substantial remains exist between Rome and south of Carthage. The BR&U tried to appropriate part of the grade through Talcottville by building from Utica, but failed as well.
- Otselic Valley Railroad – began 1906 to build a short line from Georgetown Station to South Otselic. Almost complete when the promoter absconded. Land and fixtures auctioned 1912.
- Panama Traction – took over the Warren County Traction line (not electrified) from Youngsville, Pennsylvania, to Sugar Grove, Pennsylvania, in 1916, intending to electrify and extend it via Busti, New York, to Jamestown with a branch from Busti to Panama Rocks via the Erie Railroad station at Ashville. Grading was carried out between the last two places.
- Pennsylvania and Sodus Bay Railroad – most of this was graded, and only needed rails when abandoned 1873. It ran south from Seneca Falls, crossed the competing Geneva, Ithaca and Sayre Railroad (later the Lehigh Valley Railroad) at Romulus, then west of Ithaca to Van Etten.
- Racquette River Railroad – associated with a predecessor New York and Ottawa Railway, 1895 graded a line from Tupper Lake to Axton Landing to connect with the Adirondack Extension Railroad which was a proposed extension of the Delaware and Hudson Railway from North Creek to Malone. This would have created a through route, but both roads failed.
- Rochester and Eastern Rapid Railway – graded an interurban spur line to Fairport in 1903, but did not lay rails. The town was served by the Rochester, Syracuse and Eastern Rapid Railroad interurban, which had a more direct route to Rochester.
- Rome and Osceola Railroad – 1908 began a line from Rome to Lewis, but work was abandoned 1924.
- Sodus Bay, Corning and New York Railroad – 1870 began a line from Corning to Sodus Bay. Graded between Savona and Pen Yan. Attempts to use the grade were made by several companies, notably the Penn Yan, Lake Keuka and Southern Railroad 1900 and the Corning, Keuka Lake and Ontario Railroad which tried to revive the original scheme 1905, and which was still trying 1912.
- Staten Island Tunnel – a subway line to Staten Island from Brooklyn was begun in 1923, and abandoned in 1925.
- Utica and Syracuse Air Line Railway (U&SAL) – in 1881 the Boston, Hoosac Tunnel and Western Railway (BHT&W) consolidated a chain of railroads to try and create its own line to the Erie Railroad from Rotterdam Junction. The company president was General William Lathrop Burt, so the project was nicknamed the Burt Line. The consolidation was ruled illegal in 1883, and the BHT&W gave up. The U&SAL from Utica to Syracuse was never finished, although earthworks survive in Oneida in between the New York Central Railroad and the West Shore Railroad.

==== North Carolina ====
- Coinjock Railroad – listed 1896-9 by the Interstate Commerce Commission as an operating railroad, so had laid some track. This was between Snowden and Currituck.
- Raleigh and Western Railway – 1894 took over the Egypt Railway from Colon to Egypt (now Cumnock) and began a line to Asheboro, North Carolina. Fifteen miles (24 km) to Harpers were graded. Failed 1908, having completed nothing. The grade from Egypt to Gulf was bought for use by the Sanford and Troy Railroad.

==== Ohio ====
- Cincinnati and Dayton Short Line Railroad – 1852 began a direct line between Cincinnati and Dayton, via the Deer Creek Tunnel under Walnut Hills. The incomplete tunnel was abandoned 1855, although another attempt was made in 1872 by the Cincinnati Railway Tunnel Company.
- Cincinnati Subway – the city of Cincinnati began the construction of an underground rapid transit line in 1916, but this was abandoned unfinished in 1929 after available funds ran out.
- Cincinnati Western Railroad - began 1854 to build a line to New Castle, Ohio. Abandoned works are traceable near Cincinnati, including a tunnel under Roll Hill.
- Clinton Air Line – chartered 1854 to build a line from New York to Omaha, based at Hudson. Grading was effected in places on the route in Ohio between Kinsman via Hudson to Fostoria through New London and Republic.

==== Oklahoma ====
- Arkansas, Red River and Paris Railroad – listed by the Interstate Commerce Commission in 1908 as an operating railroad, so had laid some track on its first section. This was from Morris Ferry south of De Queen, Arkansas, on the Kansas City Southern Railway, to an existing ferry across the Red River at Harris, Oklahoma. The intended destination was Paris, Texas.
- Colorado, Texas and Mexico Railroad - 1910 was building from the Chicago, Rock Island and Pacific Railroad at Mangum to the Fort Worth and Denver Railway at Chillicothe, Texas. Intended to continue south through Abilene, Texas, to Eagle Pass, Texas in the first instance, but the wider idea was a north-south trunk line from Canada through the USA into Mexico and also to Corpus Christi, Texas. Completed 14 miles (23 km) but did not operate. Route north of Mangum to Woodward was taken by the Wichita Falls and Northwestern Railway.
- Fort Smith, Arkoma and Wilburton Railroad - listed by the Interstate Commerce Commission in 1914-16 as an operating railroad with 334 yards (306 metres) of track. Proposed from Wilburton via Arkoma to Fort Smith, Arkansas.
- Kansas City, Oklahoma and Houston Railroad - listed by the Interstate Commerce Commission in 1906-08 as an operating railroad, and so had laid some track. Proposed a direct trunk line from Kansas City and Houston. Was under construction between McAlester and Honey Grove, Texas.
- Oklahoma and Cherokee Central Railroad - 1906 was building between Bartlesville and Pryor Creek. Intended to go to Blackwell.
- Sallisaw, Mcalester and Southern Railway - began 1909, listed by the Interstate Commerce Commission in 1918-31 as an operating railroad, so had laid some track. However, never operated commercially. Was building from Sallisaw to McAlester, and hoped to use the abandoned works of the Kansas City, Oklahoma and Houston Railroad (see above) from there to Honey Grove, Texas.
- Texas, Oklahoma and Northwestern Railroad - 1907 was grading between Weatherford and Taloga on a line to Woodward.
- Wichita Falls and Northwestern Railway - Lawton Branch - 1910 was constructing a line between Devol and Lawton which was never finished.

==== Oregon ====
- Summerville, Blue Mountain and Walla Walla Railroad – in 1901 had 26 miles (42 km) of grade for its line from Walla Walla, Washington, to Union via Summerville.
- Union, Cove and Valley Railroad – graded its twelve miles (19 km) line from Union to Cove in 1898.Never operated.
- Union, Cornucopia and Eastern Railroad – began work 1898 on a line from Union to Seven Devils, Idaho, via Cornucopia (now a ghost town).

==== Pennsylvania ====
- Allentown Railroad – 1855-7 almost finished grading between Allentown to Port Clinton via Kutztown and Virginville, including a tunnel at Windsor Castle.
- Broad Street Line - Downtown Loop - the Broad Street subway line in Philadelphia was to have had a downtown loop, which was aborted in 1915. An unused subway tunnel is under Arch Street.
- Lancaster and Northern Railroad - listed 1913 by the Interstate Commerce Commission as an operating railroad, having laid 4 miles (6.4 km) of track. Intended a line from Lancaster to Millway on the Reading Railroad, giving a direct route to Reading.
- Manatawny Railroad- 1913-16 listed by Interstate Commerce Commission as having 11.2 miles not in operation (18 km). The line was to have been from Douglassville to Spangsville, but only laid a short isolated section of track at Woodchoppertown.
- Milford, Matamoras and New York Railroad - 1898 built the predecessor of the Mid-Delaware Bridge between Matamoras and Port Jervis, New York, and laid track across it to a rock quarry supplying roadbed. Intended to build to Milford but failed. This bridge replaced one built by the Erie Railroad for the Milford and Matamoras Railroad in 1852 in a complex legal agreement, which had never been used until it fell down in 1870.
- Path Valley Railroad - 1893 began a line from New Germantown to Fannettsburg, but was abandoned 1895 after failing to complete the Conococheague Mountain Tunnel.
- Pennsylvania Petroleum Railway - 1872 was building between Tidioute and Cambridge Springs via Titusville. Grading was substantially complete between the last two places. Became Petroleum Railway of Pennsylvania by 1887, but opened nothing and was taken over by the Titusville, Cambridge and Lake Erie Railroad in that year (see below).
- Pittsburgh, Binghamton and Eastern Railroad - 1906 began a trunk line between Clearfield and Binghamton, New York, running via Galeton, Canton, Monroeton and Towanda. Substantial work was done between Powell near Monroeton and Canton, also a little near Binghamton. Bankrupt 1908 and work abandoned.
- Pittsburgh and Northeastern Railroad 1906-11. Chartered to build from Pittsburgh to South Bend as a terminal road for the Buffalo and Susquehanna Railroad, Pittsburg, Shawmut and Northern Railroad and Pittsburgh, Binghamton and Eastern Railroad to get to Pittsburgh. Became Pittsburgh & Northeastern Terminal 1911-16 and was listed by the Interstate Commerce Commission as an operating railroad with 211 yards (193 metres) of track. Became Pittsburgh & Northern Terminal 1916-20 and was abandoned.
- Reno, Oil Creek and Pithole Railroad - 1865 was building from Reno west of Oil City to Pithole (now a ghost town) via Rouseville and Plumer. The intention was to boost Reno and bypass Oil City. Only laid track between Rouseville and Plumer, went bankrupt in 1866 and was scrapped.
- Selinsgrove and North Branch Railroad- 1874 graded a line from Selinsgrove to Mifflintown via McAlisterville.
- South Mountain Railroad - a project for a line from Harrisburg to Hamburg via Johnstown, Fredericksburg and Strausstown with a branch from Strausstown to Reading was extant from 1854 to 1912 but only Johnstown to Fredericksburg was finished 1872-7. No commercial operation. Intended as a link in a trunk route extending the South Pennsylvania Railroad to Boston.
- South Pennsylvania Railroad - initiated 1863, major construction began 1881 but ceased 1885; many tunnels reused for the Pennsylvania Turnpike. The route was from Harrisburg to Port Perry via Bedford and Somerset. The southern tier of Pennsylvania never had a through railroad.
- Titusville, Cambridge and Lake Erie Railroad - 1887 took over the abandoned grade of the Pennsylvania Petroleum Railway (see above) between Tidioute and Cambridge Springs via Titusville. Intended to build from Cambridge Springs to Erie, and from Enterprise (east of Titusville) through Pithole to Brookville. Took over the abandoned Pithole Valley Railroad, and graded from Enterprise to Pithole. Laid track between Titusville and Tannery, 1.5 miles (2.4 km)
- Tuscarora Railroad - in 1898 this subsidiary of the Tuscarora Valley Railroad did substantial grading on an extension from Blairs Mills to McConnellsburg.

==== South Dakota ====
- Forest City and Western Railroad – 1883 graded between Forest City and Hoven on its proposed line from the former place to Bowdle.

==== Tennessee ====
- Genesis and Obed River Railroad – 1889 was grading from Genesis in Cumberland County to Sunbright. A small private logging railroad at Genesis, with no connection to the public railroad system, appropriated the name from 1918 to 1929.
- Holly Springs, Brownsville and Ohio Railroad – 1878 began a narrow-gauge line between Holly Springs, Mississippi, and Friendship via Brownsville. Grading was done between the last two places, and 12 miles (19 km) of track laid from the latter. The intention was to build through Union City to opposite Cairo, Illinois, on the Ohio River.
- Southern Railway – Stevenson Extension – this was a project to provide a new line from Chattanooga to Stevenson, Alabama, which would bypass a section of the Nashville, Chattanooga and St. Louis Railway on which the SR had trackage rights. Work began 1905, including a tunnel under Lookout Mountain, but was abandoned when substantially complete in 1907. This was a cost-cutting measure.

==== Texas ====
- Brazos and Galveston Railroad – 1839 started on a line from San Luis Island to Velasco. The bridge was begun.
- Bridgeport and Decatur Railroad - 1891 was building a line from Decatur to Bridgeport.
- Columbus, San Antonio and Rio Grande Railroad began 1858 on a line from Columbus through Gonzales and San Antonio to the Rio Grande. Tried for a decade.
- Dallas, Pacific and Southeastern Railway - 1889 began a line from Dallas to Albuquerque, New Mexico, and graded from Dallas to near Paradise. Became Dallas and New Mexico Railway 1900 and ended up with the Gulf, Texas and Western Railway 1908, but no track was ever laid on the old grade by the last-named.
- Dallas Southwestern Traction - 1917 was building an electric interurban from Dallas to Irving, Eagle Ford, Mansfield, Cleburne, Alvarado and Glen Rose.
- East Texas Traction - was grading an electric interurban between Dallas and Greenville via Garland and Rockwall between 1912 and bankruptcy in 1917.
- Estacado and Gulf Railroad - began 1910 to build 10 miles (16 km) from McCaulley to Roby, hoping later to go on to El Paso and the Gulf of California. Laid 6 miles (9.7 km) of track to a place called Norman before failing. Track and dumped equipment were scavenged for the Roby and Northern Railroad, built 1915 on a different alignment.
- Enid, Ochiltree and Western Railroad - 1909 began a line from Dalhart to Ochiltree (now a ghost town) in Ochiltree County via Dumas. Graded between Dalhart and Dumas with 14 miles (23 km) of track laid.
- Fort Worth and Albuquerque Railroad - 1889 was grading from Fort Worth to around Jacksboro. See Dallas, Pacific and Southeastern Railway, above.
- Gainesville, Whitesboro and Sherman Railway - 1906 this projected electric interurban graded for 12 miles east of Gainesville.
- Galveston, Brazos and Southwestern Railway - 1898 was under construction between Galveston and San Antonio. 1900 was sued for work done on its roadbed, involving a bridge across the Chocolate Bayou.
- Glen Rose and Walnut Springs Railroad - 1914 completed the grade of an electric interurban between Glen Rose and Walnut Springs. Listed by the Interstate Commerce Commission in 1916 as an operating railroad, but as "no trackage" in the following year.
- Gulf and Pacific Railway 1) - 1904 (only) listed by the Interstate Commerce Commission as an operating railroad, so had laid some track. Was building a trunk line from Paris to Velasco with branches from around Palestine to Dallas and around Coldspring to Dayton.
- Gulf and Pacific Railway 2) - 1914 began a line from Sweetwater to Comanche.
- Gulf and West Texas Railway - 1927 began a scheme for a direct connection between San Antonio and San Angelo, incorporating the Fredericksburg and Northern Railway and the Kerrville branch of the Southern Pacific Railroad. The SP took over the project in 1930, and abandoned it.
- Harrisburg Railroad and Trading Company - began 1841 on a line from Harrisburg to the Brazos River. Only two miles were graded.
- Houston, Trinity and Tyler Railroad - began 1860 on a line from Houston through the piney woods of East Texas by way of Tyler, Gilmer, and Jefferson. Some grading was done.
- Kansas City, Oklahoma and Houston Railroad of Texas - 1907 had graded north from Honey Grove to the Red River as part of a trunk line project from Kansas City to Houston.
- Mineola and Pittsburg Railroad - grading was in progress 1895 on this line between Mineola and Pittsburg.
- Pan American Railway - began 1891 to build from Victoria to Rio de Janeiro in Brazil but the Texas charter was to Brownsville. Completed a line of ten miles (16 km) to the Guadalupe River, then gave up because there was no money to build a bridge. No revenue traffic. Nothing to do with the Pan American Railway in Mexico.
- Port Arthur and Houston Short Line - work was under way on this direct route between Houston and Port Arthur in 1905.
- Port O'Connor, Rio Grande and Northern Railroad - 1906 set out to develop Port O'Connor. Completed grading from there to Yoakum and work was done from the latter to Gonzalez. Projected to San Antonio.
- Rock Island, Texico-Farwell and Southern Railroad - listed by the Interstate Commerce Commission 1912-16 as an operating railroad company with 3.17 miles (5.10 km) of track, but no revenue service. Proposed a line from Tucumcari, New Mexico, on the Chicago, Rock Island and Pacific Railroad to San Antonio via Farwell. Graded 38 miles (61 km) south of Farwell.
- San Antonio and Austin Interurban Railway - 1913 began constructing an electric interurban between San Antonio and Austin. Tried again in 1915.
- San Antonio, Rockport and Mexican Railway - 1912 was building lines from San Antonio to new docks at Rockport and to the Brownsville area, the junction being at Crowther near Tilden. Took over the Artesian Belt Railroad 1914 to get into San Antonio, and graded from that road's terminus at Christine to Matlock on the southern boundary of McMullen County.
- San Marcos Valley Interurban Railway - 1905 began an interurban electric railway between San Marcos and Luling.
- South Galveston and Gulf Shore Railroad - 1891 began a line from Galveston along the island for 13.5 miles (21.7 km) to the new city of South Galveston. Built 4.5 miles (7.2 km) before failing. South Galveston was wiped out by the 1900 Galveston hurricane, and the site is now the Galveston Island State Park.
- Temple–Northwestern Railway - began 1910 to build a line from Temple northwest through Gatesville and Hamilton to Comanche, about 100 miles. Forty miles of grading and five miles of track were completed.
- Texas, New Mexico and Pacific Railway - 1905 began a line from McKinney via Denton, Decatur, Bridgeport to Roswell, New Mexico. Would have taken over the grade of the Bridgeport and Decatur Railroad (see above).
- Union Central Railway - 1908 began a trunk line from Houston to Paris and the Red River, with branches to Waco and Palestine. Construction began at Palestine.
- Van Horn Valley Land and Railway - 1914 was building a line from Van Horn north to the New Mexico state line, around Pine Springs.

==== Utah ====
- Salt Lake and Pacific Railroad – 1896 began a line between Salt Lake City and Gold Hill via Saltair, Tooele, Stockton and Dugway. Graded between Saltair and Tooele.
- Union Pacific Railroad (UP) and Central Pacific Railroad (CP) – parallel grades. The two companies building the First transcontinental railroad had not agreed their meeting place before the completion ceremony of the Golden spike at Promontory, Utah. As a result, they graded closely parallel lines between Monument eastwards towards Corinne including the Big Fill (CP) and Big Trestle (UP) between Surbon and Blue Creek. Unused UP grade is extant continuously between Monument and Blue Creek, and portions of unused CP grade east of there.
- Utah Central Railway Extension – the narrow gauge Utah Central Railway (1890-1897), which was nothing to do with the Utah Central Railroad (1869–1881), was building an extension from Park City eastwards to Moon's Mill 1890, and had laid track before it went bankrupt in 1893 and work was abandoned. Proposed to the Colorado state line, 17.5 miles (28.2 km) graded.
- Utah and Wyoming Railway – 1881 began grading a line from Corinne to Granger, Wyoming.
- Wyoming, Salt Lake and California Railroad – 1890 graded between Evanston, Wyoming, and Park City

==== Vermont ====
- Burlington and Hinesburg Railroad – 1890 began a steam road from Burlington to Hinesburg. Was still incomplete in 1903, when it became the Burlington and Southeastern Railway. This proposed to electrify as an interurban, and extend to Windsor. Abandoned 1905 with grading to Hinesburg completed and four miles (6.4 km) of track laid.

==== Virginia ====
- Baltimore and Ohio Railroad, Quantico Line – the Georgetown Branch was the stub of a project for a line to Fairfax Station and Quantico, begun 1892 and abandoned by 1910.
- Manassas Gap Railroad, Independent Line – in 1854 this company began the construction of a line from Haymarket to Alexandria via Gainesville, Chantilly and Fairfax so as to obtain access to the port independent of the Orange and Alexandria Railroad. The Civil War paused the work after 1858, which was abandoned as redundant when the two companies merged as the Orange, Alexandria and Manassas Railroad in 1867. Substantial earthworks survive.
- Manassas Gap Railroad -Loudoun Branch – began 1851 as a line connecting the Manassas Gap Railroad near Manassas with Harpers Ferry and the Baltimore and Ohio Railroad. Construction halted 1857, and no part was ever completed. Earthworks survive.
- Virginia Railroad – 1897 was building from Sideburn east of Fairfax Station to Fairfax.

==== Washington State ====
- Big Bend Transit – listed 1910-14 by the Interstate Commerce Commission as an operating railroad with 0.63 miles (1.01 km) of track. Attempted to build a line from Spokane into the Spokane Indian Reservation. The destinations were to have been Fort Spokane and Davenport.
- Fidalgo City and Anacortes Railway – built an electric interurban railway from Anacortes, Washington, to Fidalgo City (now Dewey, Washington) and Dewey Beach (all on Fidalgo Island). Operation began March 29, 1891, and it was reported that cars made only one or two round trips and never ran the full length again. Apparently the line was built primarily to obtain a large land grant.

==== West Virginia ====
- Burning Springs Railroad – listed by the Interstate Commerce Commission as operating 1905-6, so had laid some track between Palestine and Burning Springs.

==== Wisconsin ====
- Bayfield, Lake Shore and Western Railroad – 1905 consolidated several tiny railroad companies operating around Bayfield and began a line from Racket Creek to Superior via Cornucopia. Only graded to the latter place, and laid some track. The railroad history of Bayfield is extremely complicated.

== Changed plans leaving unfinished works ==
The following projects had their aims altered when under construction, with work in hand being abandoned as a result.

=== Australia ===
(Australia)

- New South Wales Railways – Bankstown railway line between Campsie and Belmore, earthworks for a triangle from Enfield were built but never used due to change in plans.
- Queensland Railways – Normanton–Croydon Railway. The original intended destination was Cloncurry.

=== Canada ===
(Canada)

- Hudson Bay Railway – the original terminus of Hudson Bay was to have been Port Nelson, Manitoba, and the line was graded to here in 1912. The terminus was changed to Churchill instead in 1927, and the grade to Port Hudson abandoned. The railway's sharp change of direction at Amery is a reminder.

=== United Kingdom ===
(United Kingdom)

- Deeside Railway – planned to build line from Aboyne to Braemar and work completed to Ballater opening in 1866. Construction of earthworks for extension from Ballater to Braemar started and completed as far as site of bridge over the River Dee but then abandoned.
- Louth and Lincoln Railway – began 1866 on a direct line from Louth to Lincoln, reaching the latter place via a junction with the Great Northern Railway at Five Mile House. The western terminus was changed to Bardney, with a junction facing away from Lincoln. This was to save some money, but the proposed Louth-Lincoln service was abandoned in favour of accessing iron ore deposits that proved uneconomic to exploit.
- London Underground, Fleet Line – a section of what is now called the Jubilee line between Charing Cross and Aldwych was constructed with the first phase of the line in the 1970s along the planned route for phase 2 to the City of London. Phase 2 was cancelled and when the line was eventually extended, the route followed a more southerly route from Green Park. A short section of tunnel was also constructed to test construction techniques near New Cross on what would have been phase 3 of the Jubilee line; this has never been used.
- Manchester and Milford Railway – the company changed its northern terminus from Llanidloes to Aberystwyth. Llanidloes to Strata Florida, with a heavily engineered summit section, was abandoned as being too expensive to complete, including a 2.2 km tunnel and a long high viaduct over the Afon Ystwyth at Pont Rhyd-y-groes. The portion from Llanidloes to Llangurig was briefly opened as the Llangurig branch, and there are traces of works on both of the Myherin Tunnel portals at Blaen Myherin and Cae Gaer Roman fort. There is also evidence on maps between Llangurig and a point 2 km west at Pont Aberbidno where it would have crossed to the south side of the A44. The line would have travelled via the Afon Merin valley to Devil's Bridge before heading south to Strata Florida. The M&MR completed the rail link from Carmarthen to the north by diverting the line at Strata Florida to Aberystwyth.

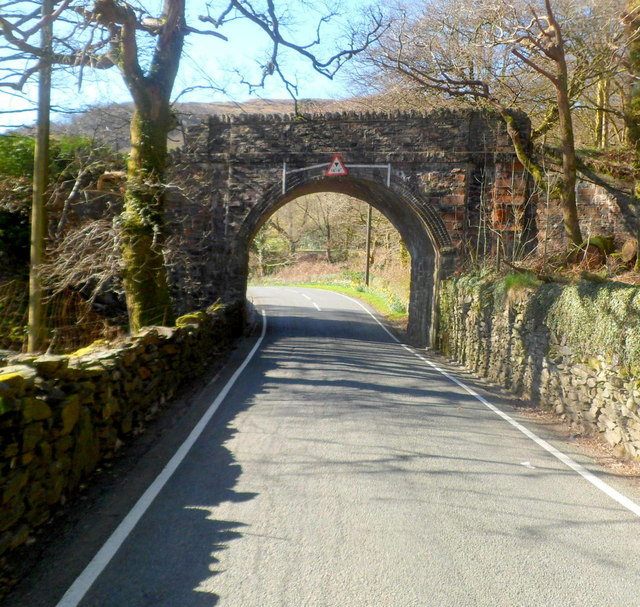
This bridge at Beddgelert was built for the Portmadoc, Beddgelert and South Snowdon Railway but never carried trains

- Portmadoc, Beddgelert and South Snowdon Railway – original plan was for an electrified railway, later opened as the steam-worked Welsh Highland Railway. New route in the Beddgelert area left some earthworks and a never-used bridge
- Oxford and Rugby Railway – intended to run from Oxford to Rugby when begun in 1845. Bought by Great Western Railway, which joined it with the Birmingham and Oxford Junction Railway to create a main line to Birmingham. Abandoned earthworks for the original route diverge from the line at Bishop's Itchington.

=== United States ===
(United States)

Massachusetts

- Massachusetts Central Railroad – was building a line from Boston to Northampton when it went bankrupt in 1883 after reaching Holden. When work resumed under the Boston and Maine Railroad in 1886, a route to the south of the original one between Holden and Belcherstown was taken and substantial work on the 1883 line through Hardwick, Greenwich, and Enfield was abandoned.

Missouri

- Memphis and Kansas City Railroad – this predecessor of the St. Louis–San Francisco Railway (SLSF) went bankrupt in 1873 leaving substantial works between Memphis, Tennessee, and Greenfield, Missouri, but having completed nothing. Most of it became the Kansas City—Memphis route of the SLSF, but grading between Ash Grove and Greenfield was abandoned for a route to the south which missed the latter place.

New York

- Hicksville and Cold Spring Branch Railroad – this subsidiary of the Long Island Railroad was originally intended to be from Hicksville to Cold Spring Harbor via Syosset in 1854, but stopped short at the latter place and the unfinished grade to Cold Spring Harbor was abandoned. Extension of the line in 1868 did not use it.
- New York, Kingston and Syracuse Railroad (NYK&S) – this predecessor of the Ulster and Delaware Railroad opened from Kingston to Stamford and was grading through Harpersfield in the direction of Oneonta when it went bankrupt in 1875. A continuation from Oneonta to Earlville was not begun, this would have connected with the Syracuse and Chenango Railroad to create a line to Syracuse. The NYK&S became the Ulster and Delaware Railroad, which abandoned Harpersfield and built to Oneonta (only) via Bloomville instead.

Texas

- Panhandle and Gulf Railway – 1899 set out to build a line from Sweetwater to Laredo via San Angelo, with the hope of going on to the Mexican Pacific coast at Topolobampo. Taken over 1900 by the Kansas City, Mexico and Orient Railway which had the same idea. Began extending north to around Quanah, but the KCMO revised its proposed route and the 15 miles (24 km) completed from Sweetwater north-east to Sylvester as well as a 7 miles (11 km) stub running south-east were abandoned.

== Railways partly operated (original intentions unfulfilled) ==
These projects were partial failures, with work on uncompleted portions being abandoned.

=== Australia ===
(Australia)

- New South Wales Railways
  - Gulgong to Maryvale section of Sandy Hollow–Maryvale railway
  - Casino to Bonalbo - construction abandoned in 1930s.
  - Guyra to Dorrigo - construction abandoned in 1950s.

=== Canada ===
(Canada)

Alberta

- Alberta Midland Railway - built a line from Calgary to Vegreville and a branch from Camrose to Edmonton. Proposed a main line from Calgary south into Montana. Left unfinished sections from Calgary to High River, and Fort Macleod to Fishburg north of Glenwood.
- Canadian Northern Railway - Peavine Line. This was begun from Hanna to Medicine Hat in 1914. Completed and opened to Steveville in 1921 with stations at Taplow, Sheerness, Rosslynn, Sunnynook, Carolside, Pollockville, Cessford and Wardlow. These places are now ghost towns. Grading was completed towards Medicine Hat, with station sites at Dinosaur, Gilburn, Princess (where the Canadian Pacific Railway was crossed), Pennymac, Bemister, Learmouth, Sinensen, Kalbeck, Stair (another crossing of the CPR) Redcliff and Medicine Hat. Work was abandoned by 1929.
- Edmonton Radial Railway - the company running the streetcar system of Edmonton received authority in 1908 for a system of electric interurban railways (called radial railways in Canada) but only managed to finish a short one to St Albert. This line was to have run to Athabasca, with a branch to Westlock. Four other lines were intended to Lac Sainte Anne, Gull Lake, Daysland and Saddle Lake.

British Columbia

- British Columbia Railway - graded to Dease Lake, and track was laid to Jackson Creek by 1977. However, trains have only run to Minaret Creek.
- Canadian Northern Pacific Railway - a line from Victoria to Port Alberni was begun in 1911 but work was abandoned beyond Kissinger in 1928.

New Brunswick

- St Louis, Richibucto and Buctouche Railway - planned a line from Bouctouche (note spelling) to Richibucto and Saint-Louis-de-Kent in 1882, but only completed a stub between the latter two places.

Nova Scotia

- Mabou and Gulf Railway - begun 1905, built from the Inverness and Richmond Railway at Mabou to coal mines and the harbour to the west, but failed to finish its intended line to Orangedale. The coal mines failed in 1909.

Ontario

- Hamilton, Grimsby and Beamsville Electric Railway - opened from Beamsville to Vineland in 1904 as the first stage of an extension to Merritton to create a Hamilton to Niagara Falls line. The project was abandoned and the extension scrapped in the following year.
- Ontario West Shore Railway - an electric railway was begun in 1909 between Goderich and Kincardine. It was opened briefly from the former place to Kintail before work ceased in 1911.
- Walkerton and Lucknow Railway - wished to build from Saugeen to Walkerton and Lucknow in 1904. Only opened to Walkerton in 1908.
- Toronto and Ottawa Railway - 1877 changed its name from Huron and Quebec Railway and began a trunk line from Toronto to Ottawa via Lindsay, Peterborough, Madoc and Carleton Place. Failed leaving substantial uncompleted works, and was taken over by the Midland Railway of Canada. From Toronto to Peterborough the route was later used, but from Peterborough to Ottawa it was abandoned except for a stub from Madoc to Bridgewater (now Actinolite) which was operated 1882-4 only.

Quebec

- Lake Champlain and St Lawrence Railway - 1879 intended to run from around Alburgh in Vermont, USA to Sorel, but only opened Stanbridge to Saint-Guillaume.
- Quebec, Montreal and Southern Railway - a Canadian subsidiary of the Delaware and Hudson Railway, intended as part of a trunk route from New York to Quebec City. The portion between Fortierville and Lévis was under construction when the Quebec Bridge collapsed in 1907, so work was suspended. The outbreak of war prevented resumption.

=== Haiti ===
(Haiti)

- Chemins de Fer de la Plaine du Cul-de-Sac - the 1895 charter included a branch to Pétion-Ville, which was unfinished.
- Compagnie Nationale des Chemins de Fer d'Haïti - 1910, began to build a line from Port-au-Prince to Cap-Haïtien, on a circuitous route through the interior of the country via Arcahaie, Montrouis, Saint-Marc, Rivière, Verrettes, La Chapelle, Mirebalais, Lascahobas, Thomassique, Hinche, Pignon, Savanette, Bahon, Grande-Rivière du Nord and Cap-Haïtien. It owned a pre-existing railroad from Gonaïves to Ennery and began a branch to the former place from Rivière, and bought a line from Cap-Haïtien to Bahon (Chemin de Fer du Nord d'Haïti). Only finished Port-au-Prince to Verrettes.

=== Honduras ===
(Honduras)

- Ferrocarril Nacional de Honduras - work on an interoceanic railway from Puerto Cortés to La Brea was begun in 1869, but never got beyond Potrerillos despite several attempts.

=== Italy ===
(Italy)

- Ferrovia Subappennina Italica - a major main line railway project, intending to provide an alternative inland route to the coastal main line between Rimini and Ancona. It was to run from Santarcangelo di Romagna to Fabriano, was begun in 1894 but the project was terminated in 1933. The section between Urbino and Fabriano was completed and opened. That between Santarcangelo and San Leo was abandoned incomplete, with stations at Poggio Berni, Verucchio and Pietracuta (the last two and part of the route then being used for a different successful railway project). From San Leo to Auditore no work was done. From Auditore to Urbino construction was also abandoned, with stations at Schieti and Trasanni.

=== Mexico ===
(Mexico)

- Ferrocarril Interoceánico de México - intended to be a coast-to-coast line from Veracruz to Acapulco, but only reached Puente de Ixtla. Acapulco never had a railway.
- Ferrocarril Mexicano del Sur - opened a route from Mexico City to Oaxaca in 1892, but the intention was to reach Puerto Ángel on the Pacific coast.
- Ferrocarril Mexico Cuernavaca y Pacifico - this was a rival line to the above from Mexico City to Acapulco, but only reached Rio Balsas.
- Ferrocarril Pachuca y Tampico - began 1912 on a trunk line from Pachuca to Tampico, but only reached Ixcaquixtla.
- Ferrocarril San Rafael y Atlixco - 1898 began a narrow gauge line from Mexico City to Atlixco, but only eventually opened to Ozumba.

=== Russia ===
(Russia)

- Salekhard–Igarka Railway (Трансполярная магистраль or Transpolar Mainline) was a Soviet Union infrastructure project under construction as part of the Gulag from 1947 to 1953. Some portions were completed, either entering operation or being abandoned and awaiting rebuilding.

=== Spain ===
(Spain)

- Ferrocarril Lleida-La Pobla is the completed part of a major international railway project to build a railway over the Pyrenees from Lleida to Saint-Girons in France with a tunnel under the Port de Salau. The scheme received final approval in 1907, and the line Balaguer was opened in 1924. Work on the Spanish side then slowed, and opening to La Pobla de Segur was in 1954. The Spanish government then announced that it was abandoning further work.
- Ferrocarril Santander - Mediterráneo - begun in 1925 to connect the ports of Santander and Valencia with a new line from the former to a junction at Calatayud with the Ferrocarril Central de Aragón. The line from Calatayud to Cidad-Dosante south of Santander was finished and opened in 1930. Construction continued on the unfinished portion to the latter city until abandonment in 1959. This had to cross the Cantabrian Mountains, and the Engaña Tunnel would have been the longest railway tunnel in Spain.

=== Turkey ===
(Turkey)

- İzmir–Eğirdir railway - was intended to reach Konya, but work beyond Eğirdir was stopped at the outbreak of the First World War and never resumed. The line from Bozanönü to Eğirdir was abandoned 2003.

=== United Kingdom ===
(United Kingdom)

- Bishops Castle Railway – line linking Central Wales Railway at Montgomery with the Shrewsbury and Hereford Railway at Craven Arms, never completed from Lydham Heath to Montgomery owing to financial problems.
- Bury St Edmunds and Thetford Railway – intended 1873 as part of a main line from Bury St Edmunds to King's Lynn via Watton. Hence, it had a south to east spur at Thetford and its own station at Thetford Bridge. The Great Eastern Railway wasn't interested in the main line intention, and never used the spur (it kept the station).
- Caledonian Railway, Coalburn to Muirkirk Line – Mid-Lanarkshire Extension Lines scheme 1896 included a line from Coalburn to Muirkirk. The section between Spireslack Colliery and Muirkirk never saw a train, because the rival Glasgow and South Western Railway was interested in obtaining running powers over it once it was opened.
- Cardiff Railway, Treforest Junction – a railway for coal traffic was opened from Cardiff docks to Treforest on the Taff Vale Railway in 1909. The junction was badly surveyed, and the latter rival company prevented its use after a single test train. No other trains ever ran between the junction and Rhydyfelin (Low Level) Halt. The unused portion included a viaduct.
- Clarence Railway – began a line to Durham in 1829, with a branch from Ferryhill to Sherburn. Only the line to Ferryhill and the branch to Old Quarrington were finished, the rest being abandoned uncompleted.
- Cranbrook and Tenterden Light Railway – intended a line to Cranbrook and Tenterden from the Hawkhurst branch line of the South Eastern Railway. Only Rolvenden to Tenterden Town was built, as part of the Kent and East Sussex Railway.
- Didcot, Newbury and Southampton Railway – a main line was begun from Newbury to Southampton via Winchester in 1882. The company ran out of funds, with the section between the two latter cities left uncompleted. This was formally abandoned in 1888, despite substantial work in hand at Southampton. The route was later taken over and opened by the Great Western Railway between Newbury and Winchester.
- East Gloucestershire Railway – begun in 1862 as a line from Cheltenham to Faringdon via Andoversford and Fairford, with a branch from the latter place to Witney. Only the branch was finished. The uncompleted works from Cheltenham to Andoversford were sold to the Banbury and Cheltenham Direct Railway.
- East Kent Light Railway – in 1925 began construction on lines from Wingham (Canterbury Road) to Canterbury West, and from Eythorne to its own terminus at Deal but were abandoned shortly afterwards. Also, the west to north curve at Eastry and the main line junction connection at Shepherds Well were unfinished. Sandwich Road to Richborough Sidings (including station at Richborough Port) was built in 1926 conveyed occasional goods trains but never opened for passenger traffic.
- East and West Yorkshire Union Railways – promoted 1883 as a main line from Leeds to Hull via the Hull and Barnsley Railway from Drax Abbey. Only managed to open a small network of colliery lines near Leeds.
- Furness Railway – Bardsey Loop line begun 1876, intended as relief main line between Ulverston and Barrow-in-Furness. Line to Conishead Priory from former place opened 1883, rest abandoned.
- Gifford and Garvald Railway. Opened to Gifford in 1901, but abandoned the portion to Garvald, East Lothian unfinished.
- Great Western Railway
  - Felin Fran at Llansamlet to Gwaun-Cae-Gurwen line. Finished to just beyond Clydach as well as to just south of Gwaen-Cae-Gurwen. Cwmgorse and Gwaen-Cae-Gurwen (South) had unused passenger stations, and an unused south-to east passenger curve to the existing Gwaen-Cae-Gurwen (Central) station had a viaduct. Middle portion of the line, including a tunnel, abandoned unfinished in 1923. Decline of the coal industry negated financial justification for completion.
  - Uxbridge through line. In 1907, work began on a line from Denham to the Uxbridge branch from West Drayton, together with a new station for the town. Work was abandoned 1914, leaving only a branch to a temporary terminus at Uxbridge High Street.
- Halifax High Level Railway – authorised 1884 as the Halifax High Level and North and South Junction Railway to serve as the terminal railway in Halifax, West Yorkshire for the Hull and Barnsley Railway and the Queensbury lines of the Great Northern Railway, with a central station separate from that of the rival Lancashire and Yorkshire Railway. A strategic route from Sheffield to Glasgow via Huddersfield and Keighley and avoiding Leeds would have been created, hence the second part of the name. The HBR was unable to achieve anything in Halifax, the GNR made an arrangement with the LYR to use the latter's station and the HHLR was left as a goods branch to the upper part of town with a passenger service of minimal usefulness.
- Headcorn and Maidstone Junction Light Railway – the unbuilt part of the intended 1904 Kent and East Sussex Railway extension from Tenterden to Maidstone West via Headcorn, using running powers to Maidstone from the South Eastern Railway goods siding at Tovil. The KESR bought a locomotive to work the line, but did nothing else.
- Hull and Barnsley Railway – as the Hull, Barnsley and West Riding Junction Railway and Dock Company, began construction of a trunk line from Hull to Halifax, West Yorkshire via Barnsley and Huddersfield. Only managed to open to Cudworth near Barnsley, which left the passenger service exiguous. The company abandoned its proposed passenger terminus at Hull Charlotte Street, and handled passengers at its good depot site at Hull Cannon Street.
- Lancashire, Derbyshire and East Coast Railway – authorised 1891 as a trunk line between proposed docks at Warrington and Sutton-on-Sea via Knutsford, Macclesfield (branch to Cheadle for Manchester), Buxton, Chesterfield and Lincoln. Only finished Chesterfield Market Place to near Lincoln, with the Beighton Branch in the direction of Sheffield.
- Lancashire and Yorkshire Railway – Rishworth branch. The line from Sowerby Bridge to Rishworth was intended as a relief main line to Littleborough, but was left as a branch in 1881 with further work abandoned.
- Liverpool, St Helens and South Lancashire Railway – 1886 was authorised from Lowton on the Wigan Junction Railways to Fazakerley to create a route to the northern Liverpool docks for St Helens, but never opened west of that town.
- Metropolitan District Railway – Hounslow Town terminus – the MDR line to Hounslow was intended to connect with the London and South Western Railway at the latter's Hounslow station but stopped short at Hounslow Town in 1883. This terminus was built as a through station, elevated above road level for a bridge that was never built.
- Metropolitan Railway – Watford Branch. Intended to terminate at Watford Central station on Watford High Street, but stopped short at Watford (Cassiobury Park Avenue) despite a property being purchased to serve as the terminus.
- Mid-Nottinghamshire Joint Railway – begun from south of Hucknall to south of Retford by the London and North Eastern Railway and London, Midland and Scottish Railway in 1926. Only completed Farnsfield to Ollerton in 1931, although the Calverton Colliery branch was built on part of the unused formation by British Railways in 1951.
- Mid Suffolk Light Railway – The company started work in 1906 on an extension from Cratfield to Halesworth which was abandoned in 1912. Some fencing of the route started from Cratfield end and some infrastructure work started at Halesworth but has since been erased with modern development. Also Kenton to Westerfield, also abandoned owing to bankruptcy in 1906. Track had been laid from Kenton to Debenham, but no facilities provided at the latter place.
- Midland Railway:
  - West Riding Lines (Bradford Through Line) included the missing link in the company's London to Scotland trunk route, comprising a main line from Royston and Notton to Bradford Forster Square. Authorised 1896, begun 1905, completed to Savile Town in Dewsbury 1906, after various attempts the rest was abandoned 1920.
  - West Riding Lines (Halifax terminus) – at Halifax, the MR was authorised in 1898 to obtain running powers on the Lancashire and Yorkshire Railway from its proposed Bradford line at Low Moor, Bradford to a new passenger and goods terminus at The Shay. An unused tunnel under Shay Syke is extant.
  - West Riding Lines (Huddersfield and Halifax) authorised 1905 as a main line from Thornhill, West Yorkshire on the Bradford Through Line to Huddersfield and Halifax. The project morphed into a goods branch following the River Calder on a different alignment, terminating at Huddersfield Newtown and with proposed passenger services abandoned. The intended passenger station on the east side of St Johns Road was still an empty plot on the 1930 six-inch Ordnance Survey map.
- Mitcheldean Road and Forest of Dean Junction Railway – begun 1871 but ran out of funds. Purchased by the Great Western Railway and completed 1882, but not used. A passenger service ran from Cinderford to Drybrook Halt from 1907, but the section from there to Mitcheldean Road never saw a train. This included the Euroclydon Tunnel.
- Oxford and Aylesbury Tramroad – took over the private Brill Tramway in 1888, and upgraded it to common carrier standards so as to form part of an electric line to Oxford. No further work was done.
- Potteries, Shrewsbury and North Wales Railway – began a line from Shrewsbury Abbey to the North Staffordshire Railway at Market Drayton in 1866, but ran out of money. A second attempt by the Shropshire Railways in 1890 failed for the same reason.
- Rhondda Valley and Hirwain Junction Railway (note spelling) – began 1867 to build from Treherbert to Hirwaun, involving a very long tunnel. This would have given the Rhondda direct access to Swansea and Merthyr Tydfil. Completed to the south tunnel portal site, but further work abandoned. The Swansea outlet was later provided by the Rhondda and Swansea Bay Railway in a different direction. Survived as a Taff Vale Railway colliery spur.
- Sheffield District Railway – intended to provide terminal facilities in Sheffield for the Lancashire, Derbyshire and East Coast Railway in 1896, but its line to the latter's Beighton Branch was abandoned and the railway became a goods exchange line in the city.
- South Hams Railway – this was intended as a joint line from Plymouth to Modbury, begun in 1895 by the Great Western Railway and London and South Western Railway, which were rivals. The GWR built to just beyond Yealmpton, but the LSWR refused to complete the line or to co-operate. Services terminated at Yealmpton on opening in 1898.
- Tickhill Light Railway – completed by the Great Northern Railway in 1912. The central portion was never used, and the rails were scavenged for the war effort in 1914.
- Thames Valley Railway – incorporated 1864 to build a line from Twickenham to Chertsey Bridge to serve the town of Chertsey. Taken over before completion by the London and South Western Railway, which already had a station in the town. As a result the branch only opened to Shepperton, but Shepperton station was still built as a through station not as a terminus.
- Wigan Junction Railways – this subsidiary of the Manchester, Sheffield and Lincolnshire Railway was authorised in 1883 to extend to Longton on the West Lancashire Railway for access to Preston. Only the line to Wigan Central railway station was opened, but that terminus was built as a through station with provision for a bridge over Crompton Street which was never built.

=== United States ===
(United States) American lumber companies could have a sense of humor when naming their railroads. Titles such as Atlanta, Skeetercloud and Gulf are not, on their own, reliable indicators of unfinished projects.

==== Alabama ====
- Birmingham and Gulf Railway and Navigation - the Black Warrior River was made fully navigable to Tuscaloosa in the 1890s, and in response this company bought the city's steam dummy streetcar system, the Tuscaloosa Belt Railway, in 1907 with the intention of using it to switch freight with its riverboats operating to Mobile, and of extending to Birmingham and Gadsden as an electric passenger and freight line. The scheme collapsed in 1912, and the city lost its streetcars until 1915 when an electrified system was built.
- Birmingham, Ensley and Bessemer Railroad - a subsidiary of the above, incorporated 1912 to build switching and terminal heavy-rail freight lines in Birmingham. It was briefly known as the Birmingham-Tidewater Railway before the bankruptcy of its parent later that year and a change of name, and what it built became part of the Birmingham streetcar system instead.
- Birmingham, Laney and Piedmont Railroad - began a line from Laney (south-east of Gadsden) east to Piedmont in 1892, but abandoned in 1895.
- Cullman Coal and Coke Company - attempted to build a public railroad from Cullman to Bremen 1911-17 but only completed six miles which were leased to a private lumber company.
- Montgomery and Southern Railway - began 1880 to build a narrow-gauge line south from Montgomery to the Gulf coast, but only got as far as Luverne by 1889. This town grew around the terminus.
- Tennessee River, Ashville and Coosa Railroad - began in 1890 to build from Anniston to Sheffield, 189 miles (304 km). Completed a spur of 6 miles (9.7 km) from Whitney to Ashville but failed and the track had been scavenged by 1900.

==== Arizona ====
- Arizona and Colorado Railroad - built 1908 from Cochise southwards to Black Knob west of Douglas. A subsidiary of the Southern Pacific Railroad. Line completed, but was never used south of Kelton.

==== Arkansas ====
- Kansas City, Arkansas and New Orleans Railroad - began 1891 to construct the Arkansas portion of a proposed trunk line from Kansas City to New Orleans. Finished seven miles, running north of Stuttgart. This and some of the abandoned grade was later used for the Hazen branch of the St. Louis Southwestern Railway.
- Kansas City and Memphis Railway - took over the Arkansas, Oklahoma and Western Railroad and the Monte Ne Railroad in 1910. The two predecessors proposed a line from Wagoner, Oklahoma, to Harrison, Arkansas. The KC&M abandoned the latter intention and began a trunk line to Memphis, Tennessee, from Cave Springs. Opened to Fayetteville and was grading to Huntsville. The line was to have gone on via Searcy, Judsonia, Augusta and Cherry Valley with a branch to Little Rock. Also tried to build a feeder line from Monte Ne to Ovid near Huntsville, but only opened two miles (3.2 km).
- Louisiana and Pine Bluff Railway - in 1926 the public timetable of this logging railroad offered service from Huttig via Dollar Junction to End of Tracks (sic), seven miles (11 km). Twenty-four further miles (39 km) to Moro Bay were allegedly under construction.
- Memphis, Dallas and Gulf Railroad (formerly Memphis, Paris and Gulf Railroad) - under the latter name graded 2 miles of line near Little Rock 1907, but then re-organised and consolidated several lumber railroads in 1910 with the intention of forming a bridge route by building from Memphis to Murfreesboro and from the Chicago, Rock Island and Pacific Railroad at Hot Springs, Arkansas to Brown, also Ashdown to Dallas. Failed to build west of Ashdown.

==== California ====
- California and Nevada Railroad - an attempt at a transcontinental narrow gauge railroad, proposed 1884 from Oakland to the Denver and Rio Grande Western Railroad in Utah. Only reached Orinda in 1891, 22 miles (35 km) of line. Part was later used for the Atchison, Topeka and Santa Fe Railway trunk line to Richmond.
- Hueneme, Malibu and Port Los Angeles Railway - only built an isolated line between Yerba Buena and Las Flores, through Malibu, by 1908. It never reached Port Los Angeles or connected with another railroad.
- Northwestern Pacific Railroad - electrified its line from San Anselmo to Manor in 1908, as part of its electric suburban passenger network from Sausalito. This was the stub of an abandoned project for an electric service to Inverness, with a new line terminating there from Point Reyes.
- Ocean Shore Railroad - was to have been an electric line from San Francisco to Santa Cruz, begun in 1905. The 1906 San Francisco earthquake crippled the project, and the portion between Tunitas Glen (at the mouth of Tunitas Creek) and Swanton was never finished. The two separate lines were not electrified.
- Northern Electric Railway - in 1913 completed an electric line from Vacaville to Willota as the first section of a route from Vallejo to Sacramento, but the company went bankrupt and further work was abandoned.
- San Francisco, Oakland, and San Jose Railway - began 1908 to build an electric railway from Oakland to San Jose, but failed and evolved into the Key System.
- Stockton and Copperopolis Railroad - began a line from Stockton to Copperopolis in 1870, but this was only completed as far as Milton after the Central Pacific Railroad took over in 1874.
- Vaca Valley and Clear Lake Railroad - began to build from Elmira to Clear Lake in 1877, but only reached Rumsey.

==== Colorado ====
- Arkansas Valley Railway - this subsidiary of the Kansas Pacific Railway was begun in 1872 from Kit Carson to Pueblo with the expectation of substantial investment from the latter city. This was not forthcoming, because the city preferred the Atchison, Topeka and Santa Fe Railway. As a result, the AVR only opened to Las Animas in 1873 and was abandoned five years later.
- Colorado, Wyoming and Great Northern Railroad - 1894 took over the Little Book Cliff Railway at Grand Junction to extend it to Green River, Wyoming. Gave up 1899. Part of the route was later earmarked for the Laramie, Hahns Peak and Pacific Railway (see below).
- Denver, Laramie and Northwestern Railroad - began in 1906 to build a direct trunk line from Denver to Seattle via Fort Collins; Laramie, Wyoming; Boise, Idaho, and Lewiston, Idaho. Began substantial works from Denver to Laramie, including the Butte Royal Tunnel just south of the state line. Only opened Denver to Greeley and abandoned the rest after bankruptcy in 1912.
- Denver and Rio Grande Railroad - began 1870 to build a narrow-gauge line from Denver to the Rio Grande at El Paso, Texas, but in 1880 famously lost a battle with the Atchison, Topeka and Santa Fe Railway over a right of way through the Raton Pass which could only accommodate one line of railroad. So, it turned westwards and became Colorado's east to west trunk line railroad system instead -without ever bothering to change its name.
- Denver and Salt Lake Railway - intended to build a trunk line from Denver to Salt Lake City via Vernal, Utah, and the Uinta Basin, but the completed line never got further than Craig in 1913. The company surrendered to the rival Denver and Rio Grande Railroad in 1931.
- Denver, South Park and Pacific Railroad - between 1882 and 1888 built a line from Gunnison to Baldwin and continued work towards the Kebler Pass which it abandoned on bankruptcy.
- Georgetown, Breckenridge and Leadville Railway - began in 1880 to build from Georgetown to Keystone, but stopped at Graymont. The Atlantic-Pacific Tunnel under the Continental Divide was begun at both ends, but abandoned unfinished.
- Greeley and Denver Railroad - began in 1907 to build an electric interurban between Greeley and Denver, and graded some of its line from the former place. Only operated a small streetcar system on a loop route in Greeley.
- Laramie, Hahns Peak and Pacific Railway - 1911 reached Coalmont, but the main line was to have gone from Northgate to Grand Junction via Steamboat Springs.

==== Connecticut ====
- New York, Housatonic and Northern Railroad - chartered in 1863 to run from White Plains, New York, northeast via North Salem, New York, Ridgebury, Danbury to Brookfield on the Housatonic Railroad. It was only finished north of Danbury in 1868, and 23 miles (37 km) of unfinished line was abandoned. The grade between North Salem and Danbury was occupied by the Danville and Harlem Traction.

==== Florida ====
- Tampa and Jacksonville Railroad - in 1906 took over the Gainesville and Gulf Railroad from Sampson City through Gainesville to Micanopy as part of a proposed main line from Jacksonville to Tampa, but only completed a dead-end extension to Emathla.
- Pensacola, Mobile and New Orleans Railroad - begun in 1907 to build a direct link between Pensacola and Mobile with terminal facilities for the trunk line railroads using the two ports. Only built from Pensacola to a dead-end location called Pemona AL, and operated as a logging railroad. Became the Gulf Ports Terminal Railway in 1917. This is quoted as an example of a publicly expressed proposal being possibly fraudulent, to mislead investors.
- South Florida and Gulf Railway - graded 1914 from Kenansville to Basinger, and laid tracks to Prairie Ridge. This was part of an attempt to bring the area into cultivation, but it comprises fossil sand dunes and the railroad was scrapped in 1918.
- Tallahassee, Perry and Southeastern Railroad - built from Tallahassee through Covington to Waylonzo, and graded to Perry before abandoning work in 1907.

==== Georgia ====
- Atlantic, Waycross and Northern Railroad - in 1911 took over the St Marys and Kingland Railroad, a short line between Kingsland and the little port of St Marys, the intention being to make the latter a rival to Brunswick and to build a trunk line from the former to connect with the Southern Railway at Fort Valley. The effort was wasted.
- Georgia Florida and Alabama Railroad - in 1898 took over the abandoned route of the Bainbridge, Cuthbert and Columbus Railroad which had attempted to build between Bainbridge and Columbus, for a line from the latter place to the Gulf port of Carrabelle, Florida. The GFA failed to reach Columbus in its turn.
- Georgia Southwestern and Gulf Railroad - began a line from Albany to Panama City, Florida, in 1908 but abandoned work. It took over the Albany and Northern Railway instead.
- Pelham and Havana Railroad - built from Cairo to Havana, Florida, in 1910, but never finished from Cairo to Pelham.
- Smithonia, Danielsville and Carnesville Railroad - built 1895 from Colbert to Smithonia but failed to get from the former place to Danielsville and Carnesville.

==== Idaho ====
- Lewiston, Nezperce and Eastern Railroad - in 1912 took over the abandoned grade of the Lewiston Southeastern Electric Railway which had graded from Lewiston to Tammany by 1907 and intended to reach Grangeville via Waha. The LNE began to build to Craigmont and connect with the Nez Perce and Idaho Railroad to Nezperce, also a branch to Asotin, but only opened to Tammany briefly.
- Pacific, Idaho and Northern Railroad - took over the abandoned grade of the Weiser, Idaho and Spokane Railroad at Weiser in 1899 and completed to New Meadows. Work on an extension to Seven Devils with a branch to Helena (now a ghost town) was abandoned.
- Spokane and Inland Empire Railroad - the branch to Hayden Lake, opened in 1906, was intended to reach Bayview.

==== Illinois ====
- Alton, Jacksonville and Peoria Railway - only completed Alton to Jerseyville in 1912 but went no further. The city of Carrollton paved its Courthouse Square in anticipation of its arrival, incorporating a length of track -and Ripley's Believe It or Not! described this at The Shortest Railroad in the World.
- Bloomington, Pontiac and Joliet Electric Railway - began 1905 to build a line from Bloomington to Joliet via Pontiac, which would have been part of an electric interurban passenger line from Chicago to St Louis. Only opened Pontiac to Dwight.
- Chicago and Illinois River Railroad - set out to build from Chicago to Keokuk, Iowa, in 1873 but only opened to Gorman south-west of Coal City before running out of funds. Its unfinished grade from there to Streator became part of the Atchison, Topeka and Santa Fe Railway main line, but the Mississippi River crossing at Keokuk never obtained a trunk line to Chicago.
- Chicago, Milwaukee and Gary Railroad - formed 1908 to create an outer belt line around Chicago, from Milwaukee to Gary, Indiana. Only opened a line from Rockford, Illinois, to Delmar in Kankakee County, Illinois, and became part of the Milwaukee Road. The two unbuilt portions still featured in publicity in the early 1920s.
- Chicago, Ottawa and Peoria Railway - the branch from Ottawa to Streator was the only section finished, in 1908, of this interurban's main line to Peoria and Mackinaw, forking at Eureka.
- Kankakee and Urbana Traction - begun 1909 to build an interurban line from Urbana to Kankakee, to connect with the Chicago and Southern Traction and to give Urbana a direct rail route to Chicago. Only opened to Paxton.
- Northern Illinois Electric Railway - 1901 began an interurban electric line from Dixon to Steward via Lee Center with a branch from the latter place to Amboy. Only the branch was finished and opened, with a section of the main line to Middlebury opened by the successor Lee County Central Electric Railway.
- Quincy, Carrollton and St Louis - purchased the Litchfield, Carrollton and Western from Litchfield to the port of Columbiana on the Illinois River just west of Eldred in 1899, but failed to build its extension to Quincy and its line to St Louis only reached Reardon.
- Woodstock and Sycamore Traction Company - opened 1911 from Sycamore to Marengo but could not complete to Woodstock. Also, it was intended as an interurban electric railroad but never electrified and used gasoline cars.

==== Indiana ====
- Bluffton, Geneva and Celina Traction - Tried to build from Bluffton to Celina, Ohio, via Geneva in 1909, but only reached Geneva and abandoned further work. The place only had 900 people and the venture was hopeless, being scrapped in 1917.
- Chicago, Cincinnati & Louisville Railroad - completed a line from Cincinnati to Griffith before going bankrupt in 1910. Taken over by the Chesapeake and Ohio Railway, which completed between Griffith and Hammond but abandoned work on the line between Miamitown, Ohio, and Louisville, Kentucky, via Madison.
- Chicago – New York Electric Air Line Railroad - began construction of an express electric railroad from Chicago to New York in 1906, and finished 21 miles (34 km) of an interurban connecting Gary, Indiana, with La Porte, Indiana.
- Chicago and Wabash Valley Railroad - the Onion Belt began 1898 to construct a line from Rensselaer on the Monon Railroad to Crown Point and Gary. Only opened to Dinwiddie and graded to Crown Point. The Monon took over in 1914, and abandoned work.
- Indianapolis and Cincinnati Traction Company - Built from Indianapolis to Connersville in 1906, and got no further.
- Toledo and Chicago Interurban Railway - began 1907 to build from Goshen to Bryan, Ohio, and a connection into Toledo via the Toledo and Indiana Railway, with a branch to Fort Wayne. Only finished the branch, and a segment of the main line between Kendallville and Waterloo before going bankrupt and re-emerging as the Fort Wayne and Northwestern Railway in 1913.
- St Joseph Valley Railway and St Joseph Valley Traction - this pair of putative interurbans tried to establish an electric passenger route from Elkhart via Lagrange and Angola to the Toledo and Western Railway at Pioneer, Ohio, and so create a Chicago to Toledo, Ohio, interurban. The Traction was from Elkhart to Lagrange, but only electrified to Bristol. The Railway only reached Columbia in Williams County in 1915, using grading left by the Toledo and Western Railroad but could not connect with the latter and was abandoned in 1918.

==== Iowa ====
- Chicago, Fort Madison and Northwestern Railroad - took over the Fort Madison and Northwestern Railroad in 1890. The latter began in 1871 to build a narrow gauge line from Fort Madison to Council Bluffs via Des Moines but only got to Collett. The CFMNW built to Ottumwa on the way to Des Moines, but went bankrupt and was taken over by the Chicago, Burlington and Quincy Railroad in 1899. All work west of Batavia was abandoned.
- Creston, Winterset and Des Moines Railroad intended a line from Creston to Des Moines, but abandoned work after reaching Macksburg in 1912.

==== Kansas ====
- Arkansas Valley Interurban Railway - built a fragment 1911 of an extensive proposed network centred on Wichita. The main line was to have been from Wichita to Salina via Newton, with a branch from Van Arsdale Junction (south-west of Newton) to Hutchinson and Great Bend. From Hutchinson, a third line would have run direct to Hudson.To the south of Wichita, a line would have run to Oxford via Belle Plaine, with a short branch to Wellington from the latter place. At Oxford, it would have joined a circular service running Oxford - Winfield - Arkansas City - Geuda Springs- Oxford which would have subsumed a pre-existing little interurban between Winfield and Arkansas City called the Southwestern Interurban Railway of Kansas.
- Colorado, Kansas and Oklahoma Railroad - took over the bankrupt Scott City Northern Railroad 1913, which had been opened from Scott City to Winona in 1911. Began construction of a trunk line from the latter to Denver, also from Garden City to Forgan, Oklahoma, and the Wichita Falls and Northwestern Railway -trackage over the Santa Fe from Scott City to Garden City. Bankrupt 1917 without having opened any further lines.
- Kansas City, Mexico and Orient Railway - began 1900 to build a transcontinental from Kansas City, Kansas, to the Mexican Pacific port of Topolobampo. Did not complete from Kansas City to Wichita owing to bankruptcy in 1912, although grading was done from the latter place to Bazaar. The right of way from Lawrence and the terminal properties at Kansas City were purchased by the Kansas City, Kaw Valley and Western Railway which opened in 1914.
- Kansas City, Kaw Valley and Western Railway - built from Kansas City, Kansas, to Lawrence in 1915, but never made it to Topeka as intended.
- Kansas and Oklahoma Railway - built from Liberal to a dead end at Woods to the east (now a ghost town) in 1922, on the line of the failed Santa Fe, Liberal and Englewood Railroad. Failed, in its turn, to achieve its purpose of providing Liberal with a connection to the Wichita Falls and Northwestern Railway at Forgan, Oklahoma -Woods to Folsom was on the line of the failed Colorado, Kansas and Oklahoma Railroad.
- Memphis, Kansas and Colorado Railway - 1877 began work on a narrow gauge line from Memphis, Tennessee, to the Denver and Rio Grande Railroad in Colorado. It opened from Cherryvale to Weir City, in 1881, and abandoned further work.

==== Kentucky ====
- Chesapeake and Nashville Railway 1883 inherited a line from Nashville, Tennessee, to Scottsville and began construction on a line to Danville via Glasgow. Work was abandoned, leaving grading between Scottsville and Glasgow.
- Covington, Flemingsburg and Pound Gap Railway - began 1876 to build a narrow gauge line from Covington to Hazel Green via Flemingsburg, Hillsboro and Salt Lick. This and its successor companies only opened from Flemingsburg Junction to Hillsboro, although much grading was done in the direction of Covington by the Cincinnati and Southeastern Railway and the terminus was altered to West Liberty by the abortive Licking Valley Railroad both in 1880. Ended up as the Flemingsburg and Northern Railroad. The Licking River Railroad built up the river from Salt Lick to Blackwater, but in its turn failed to reach West Liberty which never saw a railroad.
- Kentucky Midland Railway - 1888 began a line from Frankfort via Paris and Owingsville to Salt Lick and up the Licking River valley. Completed to Paris and became the Frankfort and Cincinnati Railroad, but abandoned work east of Paris.
- Louisville and Eastern Railroad - attempted to build two inter-city interurban electric lines from Louisville to Cincinnati and Frankfort in 1901, but only managed to open to La Grange and Shelbyville respectively.
- Owensboro and Nashville Railway - the attempt to build a main line railroad from Owensboro to Nashville, Tennessee, in competition with the Louisville and Nashville Railroad began in 1873, but never finished south of Adairville. This was to have been the St Louis route of the Nashville, Chattanooga and St. Louis Railway but the L&N and the Illinois Central Railroad stymied it, there never was an Ohio River railroad bridge at Owensboro and the unfortunate city never amounted to much.

==== Louisiana ====
- Louisiana Central Railroad - 1883 purchased the Baton Rouge, Gros Tete and Opelousas Railroad from Baton Rouge to Musson via Rosedale, and began a line from Rosedale to Lafayette which it never completed.
- New Orleans, Mobile and Texas Railroad - 1877 graded from Westwego to the Sabine River. Westwago to White Castle went to the Texas and Pacific Railway and Lafayette to Sabine River ended up with the Southern Pacific Railroad eventually, but White Castle to Lafayette was abandoned unfinished.
- St. Louis, Iron Mountain and Southern Railway - 1905 began a line from Eudora, Arkansas, to Gilbert but only opened to Delhi and abandoned the rest unfinished. Stations on the uncompleted portion would have been Pickrum, Lamar, Crowville and Cordill.

==== Maine ====
- Wiscasset, Waterville and Farmington Railway - as the Wiscasset and Quebec Railroad built from Wiscasset to Burnham 1900, but never opened beyond Albion. An associated company called the Franklin, Somerset and Kennnebec tried to build between Waterville and Farmington in 1897, but achieved little.

==== Maryland ====
- Kent County Railroad - began a dead-end line from Massey to Chestertown in 1870, and made two abortive attempts to reach the Chesapeake Bay. The original terminus was to have been Rock Hall from Worton, begun by the Bay Extension Railroad 1872 but only completed as a stub to a place called Belair, Fairlee, Parsons or Nicholson. There is evidence for a second stub from Chestertown, and possibly two stub termini (Nicholson was the northern one) with a triangular layout if the project had completed. In 1873, the projected terminus was altered to Tolchester Beach from Nicholson, and this route was graded and a steamer pier begun by the Smyrna and Delaware Bay Railroad before the second abandonment the same year.
- Washington, Brandywine and Point Lookout Railroad - it and its predecessors only built from Brandywine to Mechanicsville, although much of the route to Point Lookout was later used by the US Navy line to Patuxent. Also graded a stub in east Washington, the East Washington Railroad. appropriated illegally by the Chesapeake Beach Railway and later a short line in its own right.

==== Michigan ====
- Chicago and Canada Southern Railway - 1871 began a trunk line from an international ferry crossing between Grosse Ile and Amherstburg, Ontario, to Chicago. Only completed from Grosse Ile to Fayette, Ohio. The unfinished grade between Montpelier, Ohio, and North Liberty, Indiana, was later used by the Wabash Railroad.
- Detroit, Toledo and Milwaukee Railroad - subsidiary of the New York Central Railroad system, incorporated 1897 to build a line from Toledo, Ohio, to Holland and operate a car ferry to Milwaukee. Only ran from Dundee to Allegan, and never reached Lake Michigan.
- Milwaukee, Benton Harbor and Columbus Railway - 1897 took over the St Joseph Valley Railway in order to extend it from South Bend to Benton Harbor and Milwaukee by car ferry. Finished Buchanan to Benton Harbor, but the Buchanan to South Bend portion was abandoned with stations at Bertrand and State Line.
- Toledo, Ann Arbor and Detroit Electric Railway - began 1903 to build from Toledo, Ohio, to Ann Arbor, completed to Dundee and graded the rest but never electrified. The Dundee stub became theToledo-Detroit Railroad and then part of the Detroit, Toledo and Ironton Railroad.

==== Minnesota ====
- Duluth, St Cloud, Glencoe and Mankato Railroad - began 1900 to build a trunk line from Duluth to southern Minnesota, via St. Cloud, Glencoe and Mankato. Only completed part of a feeder from Albert Lea to the last-named, which stopped short at St. Clair to become a dead-end branch of the Chicago, Milwaukee, St. Paul and Pacific Railroad in 1910.
- Electric Short Line Railway - planned to build an electric interurban from Minneapolis to Brookings, South Dakota, began 1914 but only reached Gluek in 1927 as the Minnesota Western Railway. Never electrified.
- Minneapolis, St. Paul, Rochester and Dubuque Electric Traction - began 1908 to build an electric interurban system with a main line from Minneapolis via Northfield and Rochester to Dubuque, Iowa, with branches Northfield to Austin via Faribault and Owatonna, Faribault to Mankato, and Owatonna to Albert Lea. Only built to Northfield, and graded to Faribault. Became the Minneapolis, Northfield and Southern Railway. Never electrified.

==== Mississippi ====
- Aberdeen and Tombigbee Valley Railroad - 1907 graded a line from Okolona via Aberdeen to Columbus. Aberdeen to Columbus only was used by the St. Louis–San Francisco Railway, the rest was abandoned unfinished.
- Meridian Brookhaven and Natchez Railroad - in 1882 bought a private logging railroad at Brookhaven in order to extend it as a trunk line to Meridian. Went bankrupt 1888, having achieved little beyond extending to a quarry. Became a very small Illinois Central Railroad subsidiary.
- Mobile and Northwestern Railroad - 1870 began a narrow gauge line from Trotters Point, across the Mississippi River from Helena, Arkansas, to Jackson via Yazoo City. Only managed to complete to Clarksdale before failing in 1886.
- Nashville and Mississippi Delta Railroad - began 1890 to build between Grenada and Nettleton, but failed and sold uncompleted works to the Southern Railroad. The latter opened Okolona to Calhoun City only, detached from its main system. A predecessor company, the Vicksburg and Nashville Railroad, had constructed 5 miles (8.0 km) of narrow gauge track on the route at Grenada in 1872.
- New Orleans, Jackson and Great Northern Railroad - in 1867 was in the process of finishing a line between Canton and Aberdeen. Most of this was completed under the aegis of its successor the Illinois Central Railroad, but grading between Canton and Kosciusko was abandoned.

==== Missouri ====
- Iowa and St. Louis Railway - had completed a line from Centerville, Iowa, to Elmer in 1901. The original intention was to build from Centerville to Des Moines, Iowa, and from Macon to St Louis thus creating a trunk line. Became part of the Chicago, Burlington and Quincy Railroad, which began work 1903 to Macon with stations at Barnesville and Bloomington, then from Macon through Enterprise and Woodlawn in the direction of Paris. The ultimate destination would have been Mexico, and a connection with its line there to St Louis. None of this was completed.
- Kansas City Rock Island Railroad - this was a subsidiary of the Chicago, Rock Island and Pacific Railroad and was intended to be the terminal road in Kansas City for another subsidiary, the St. Louis, Kansas City and Colorado Railroad from St Louis to Hadsell near Gunn City. Did not get any nearer Kansas City than Leeds in 1904.
- Mexico, Santa Fe and Perry Traction - began 1907 to build from Mexico to Perry but only opened to Santa Fe in 1910, abandoning the rest. Shut down in 1915.

==== Montana ====
- Minneapolis, St. Paul and Sault Ste. Marie Railroad - the western extension terminating at Whitetail was intended to go on to Sweetgrass for a connection with the Canadian Pacific Railway to Vancouver.
- Montana Southern Railway - this narrow gauge line from Divide to Coolidge (now a ghost town) was intended to go on to Jackson.

==== Nebraska ====
- Chicago, Burlington and Quincy Railroad - its subsidiary the Lincoln and Black Hills Railroad built three branches from Palmer into the Sandhills after 1897. These reached Sargent, Burwell and Ericson but all were graded further. Sergent's grade went to Brewster, but the other two ended nowhere.
- Omaha, Lincoln and Beatrice Railway (OL&B) - formed in 1903 to build an electric interurban between Lincoln and Omaha, also from the former to Beatrice on which no work was ever done. A five-mile (8 km) line was built from downtown Lincoln to Bethany, and grading for a further five miles. Grading was also done west of South Omaha. The Omaha and Lincoln Railway was allied to the project, and opened from Omaha to Papillion in 1914. The OL&B survives to this day (2020) as a switching railroad.

==== New Jersey ====
- Mercer and Somerset Railway - never completed a bridge over the Millstone River at Millstone to link with the Millstone and New Brunswick Railroad before going bankrupt and being abandoned in 1880.
- New Jersey and Pennsylvania Railroad - 1904 consolidated the Rockaway Valley Railroad (RVR) from Whitehouse Station to Watnong, and the Speedwell Lake Railroad (SLR) which was a failed attempt 1897 to build a line from Morristown to a resort on Speedwell Lake. A serious attempt was made 1910 to extend the RVR to Morristown, over the grade of the SVR, but work was abandoned. Intended to build from Morristown to Paterson and from Whitehouse to Flemington.
- New Jersey West Line Railroad - began 1870 to build from Newark to Bernardsville via Union, Millburn and Summit. Only completed Summit to Bernardsville, which became part of the Gladstone Branch.
- Trenton and Mercer County Traction - built an interurban line from Trenton via Yardville to Crosswicks with the intention of going on to Allentown. The Pennsylvania Railroad won a court case preventing a crossing at Yardville, and the line from there to Crosswicks was scrapped unused in 1917.

==== New Mexico ====
- Atchison, Topeka and Santa Fe Railway - Colmor Cutoff was begun 1930 from Felt, Oklahoma, the terminus of a line from Dodge City, Kansas, to Colmor (north of Wagon Mound) via Mount Dora. This was to have been part of the company's transcontinental route. Only finished a stub from Mount Dora to Farley, and the rest was abandoned unfinished.
- Santa Fe, Raton and Des Moines Railroad - began 1906 on a line from mines at Carisbrooke east of Raton to Des Moines via Cunningham on the St. Louis, Rocky Mountain and Pacific Railway. The line from Cunningham to Des Moines was ready for rails when work was abandoned. This would have linked to the failed Santa Fe, Liberal and Englewood Railroad scheme.
- St Louis, Rocky Mountain and Pacific Railroad - 1907 did some work on an extension from its terminus at Ute Park to Taos, including a tunnel at Eagle Nest Lake.

==== New York ====
- Boston, Hartford and Erie Railroad - this predecessor of the New York and New England Railroad took over the Newburgh, Dutchess and Connecticut Railroad line from Hopewell Junction to Dutchess Junction on the New York Central Railroad main line in 1868, and tried to build a car ferry terminal on Dennings Point to link with the Erie Railroad terminal across the Hudson River at Newburgh. Remains survive.
- Buffalo, Batavia and Rochester Railway - 1904 tried to build a heavy-rail electric interurban from Buffalo to Rochester via Batavia, but only finished a two-mile stub in Batavia which it operated as a little streetcar service.
- Buffalo, Corning and New York Railroad - 1851 began a line from Corning to Buffalo, and completed it to Batavia. Work from Batavia in the direction of Buffalo was abandoned.
- Buffalo Southern Railway - this interurban system (nothing to do with the Buffalo Southern Railroad) tried to build a line from Ebenezer to East Aurora 1907, but only opened to East Seneca.
- Buffalo, Thousand Islands and Portland Railroad - chartered 1890 to build terminal lines in the Buffalo and Niagara Falls area for the Rome, Watertown and Ogdensburg Railroad (RW&O) to get to Buffalo and the Lehigh Valley Railroad LVR to get to the Niagara Falls Suspension Bridge. The RW&O became part of the New York Central Railroad (NYC) system in 1891, but work on grading went ahead. The company still existed in 1908, but the LVR obtained trackage rights over the NYC instead and stopped short at Tonawanda Junction. The right of way between Buffalo (Main & Erie) and Niagara Falls was used by the International Railway electric interurban for its Fast Line, opened 1918, but between North Tonawanda Junction and Tonawanda Junction (LVR), and Main & Erie and East Buffalo (LVR), it was abandoned.
- Cooperstown and Charlotte Valley Railroad - graded from its terminus at Davenport Center through Harpersfield towards Cooksburg, but abandoned this in 1890.
- Delaware and Eastern Railroad - 1907 began construction of an extension by a subsidiary company, the Schenectady and Margaretville Railroad, from Arkville parallel to the Ulster and Delaware Railroad to Grand Gorge and then to Schenectady. Abandoned grade through Prattsville.
- Delhi and Middletown Railroad- began 1870 to build between Delhi to Arkville via Andes but went bankrupt in the 1873 financial panic. The grade between Andes and Arkville was appropriated by the Delaware and Eastern Railroad for its Andes Branch, and that between Delhi and Andes by the failed Delaware Railroad.
- Lake Ontario, Auburn and New York Railroad - 1853 graded most of a line from Fair Haven to Ithaca via Auburn. Most of this Murdock Line was taken up by later railroads, except for the section graded from South Lansing to Ithaca.
- New York, Boston and Montreal Railroad - 1873 consolidated several small railroads and began links between them to provide a trunk route from New York to Rutland, Vermont. Quickly went bankrupt, but was responsible for the New York and Putnam Railroad. Abandoned grading exists between Carmel and Clove Valley, also Pine Plains and Chatham.
- New York and Rockaway Railroad this subsidiary of the Long Island Railroad built from Hillside to Far Rockaway in 1872. The portion between Springfield Junction and Cedarhurst (nicknamed the Cedarhurst Cut-off) was abandoned 1876, relaid with third rail for electric trains 1908, scrapped again 1918, re-laid again 1928 and scrapped finally in 1936. It never saw a revenue train in the 20th century.
- New York, West Shore and Buffalo Railroad - 1885 was in the process of building a large passenger terminal station in Buffalo, on Michigan Street just north of the Chicago Street station of the Erie Railroad. The NYC purchased the bankrupt railroad in that year, and cancelled the project.
- Rochester, Nunda and Pennsylvania Railroad - 1872 this narrow-gauge line graded sections of its proposed line between Rochester and Mount Morris. Abandoned on bankruptcy 1877.
- Sackets Harbor and Saratoga Railroad - chartered 1848 to build from Saratoga Springs to Sackets Harbor. What was built became the Delaware and Hudson Railroad branch to North Creek, and disjunctive lengths of grading survive from the latter place to Carthage.
- Second Avenue Subway - proposed 1920, began 1972, halted 1975, began again 2007, might be open 2029.
- Suffolk Traction - was building an interurban line from its terminus at Holtsville station to Port Jefferson when it went bankrupt in 1920.

==== North Carolina ====
- Appalachian Interurban Railway - 1905 proposed an electric interurban from Hendersonville to Asheville, and in the following year also from Hendersonville to Rutherfordton via Chimney Rock. Opened a horsecar line from Laurel Park to Rainbow Lake as the first part of the former. The equipment was three cars and three horses named Appalachian, Electric and Interurban. Taken over by the local streetcar company, Henderson Traction (which used battery cars), in 1912.
- Asheville and Northern Railway - 1905 projected as a steam road from Asheville north-eastwards via Weaverville, Mars Hill, Faust and English to the Tennessee border and a connection with the Clinchfield Railroad beyond. Affiliated with the Asheville and Craggy Mountain Railroad. Morphed into a small electric interurban to Weaverville, the Asheville and Eastern Tennessee Railroad, which got no further.
- Blue Ridge and Atlantic Railroad - 1888 bought a pre-existing railroad from Cornelia, Georgia, to Tallulah Falls, Georgia, in order to extend it to Maryville, Tennessee, and create a low-level trunk route from Knoxville, Tennessee, to Savannah, Georgia. Failed, but its successor the Tallulah Falls Railway built on its grade to Franklin.
- Carolina and Northeastern Railroad - formed 1917 and opened a line from Gummberry near Weldon to Lasker. Lasker to Ahoskie was never completed.
- Carolina and Tennessee Southern Railroad - 1915 intended to connect with the Tennessee and Carolina Southern Railroad through the Deals Gap, but only got to Fontana from Bushnell. This was the last of several attempts at this low-level route from Knoxville to Savannah. See Blue Ridge and Atlantic Railroad above.

==== North Dakota ====
- Midland Continental Railroad - began 1906 to build a mid-continent north-south railroad line between Canada and the Gulf of Mexico. Achieved a short line between Edgeley and Wimbledon via Jamestown.
- Minneapolis, St. Paul and Sault Ste. Marie Railroad - the line to Sanish was meant to have gone on to Fairview, Montana, but work stopped at the site of the proposed Missouri River bridge in 1914.

==== Ohio ====
- American Midland Railway - 1889 proposed a direct route from Jersey City to Fort Wayne and Chicago with, a branch to St. Louis. This would have been via a low-grade crossing of the Allegheny Mountains through Pennsylvania. Only built Findlay to Fort Wayne, and became the Findlay, Fort Wayne and Western Railway which went on to be part of the Cincinnati, Hamilton and Dayton Railway.
- Cincinnati, Columbus and Atlantic Railroad - 1882 took on a project for a narrow-gauge line from Cincinnati to Nelsonville. Completed to Newtonsville and graded to Hillsboro but opened nothing before being wound up in 1891. A separate section (standard-gauge) was completed, and then operated 1890 from Kingston to Adelphi as the Marietta, Hocking and Northern Railroad. Two interurbans, the Cleveland and Columbus Railway (to Hillsboro) and the Cincinnati, Milford and Blanchester Railway, utilised part of the grade to Hillsboro. Another bit was taken over by the Columbus, Lancaster and Wellston Railway (see below).
- Cincinnati, Georgetown and Portsmouth Railroad - 1881 was constructing a line from Cincinnati to Portsmouth, but only got to Russellville. Grading from there to West Union was abandoned.
- Columbus and Lake Michigan Railroad - 1902 took over from the Columbus, Lima and Milwaukee Railroad a scheme for a line from Columbus to Saugatuck, Michigan, and a ferry to Milwaukee. The section from Lima to Defiance had been completed, and Columbus to Lima was being graded. The completed section became part of the Indiana, Columbus and Eastern Traction interurban in 1906.
- Columbus, Lancaster and Wellston Railway - began 1895 to build a line between Columbus and Wellston. Opened from near Stoutsville to South Bloomingville and prepared a further four miles to Ash Cave. This, and the line from Laurelville to South Bloomingville had been originally graded by the Cincinnati, Columbus and Atlantic Railroad (see above). Ended up as the Columbus and Southern Railroad without achieving anything further.
- Columbus, New Albany and Johnstown Traction - began 1900 to build an interurban from Columbus to Johnstown via New Albany. Only opened a stub to Gahanna (then a small village) which was taken over by the city streetcar company.
- Columbus, Urbana and Western Railway - as the Urbana, Mechanicsburg and Columbus Electric Railway initiated an interurban project from Columbus to Urbana via Mechanicsburg in 1900. Changed name in 1904 for a new effort. Only achieved a very short line 1903 from Columbus to Fishinger Bridge near Griggs Dam.
- Fairport, Painesville and Eastern Railroad - began 1910 to build from Fairport to Austinburg on the Pennsylvania Railroad, but only eventually reached Harpersfield Township.
- Lake Erie, Bowling Green and Napoleon Railway - before it went bankrupt in 1911, had opened from Bowling Green to Woodville and a junction with the Lake Shore Electric Railway, and was building to Port Clinton. Also, it had opened Bowling Green to Tontogany and was aiming at Napoleon and Defiance.
- Lake Erie and Pittsburgh Railway - began 1903 to build a line between Lorain and Youngstown. Only the portion between Macey on the Cleveland Short Line Railway and Brady Lake was completed.
- Lorain and West Virginia Railroad - began 1906 on a line from Lorain to the West Virginia line at or near Marietta. Co-opted by the Wheeling and Lake Erie Railway, which opened Lorain to Wellington to gain access to the former place and abandoned the rest.
- Mansfield, Coldwater and Lake Michigan Railroad - began 1870 to build from Mansfield to Allegan, Michigan, via Tiffin, Fostoria, Napoleon, Montpelier, Coldwater, Michigan, Monteith near Kalamazoo, Michigan, and Allegan, Michigan. Completed Mansfield to Tiffin, which became part of the Pennsylvania Railroad, and Monteith to Allegan and left substantial uncompleted works of the rest in Ohio and Michigan including grades north and south of Coldwater.
- Ohio Southern Railroad - 1883 took over the Cincinnati, Columbus and Hocking Valley Railroad line from Claysville Junction north of Waynesville to Jeffersonville which was to have gone on to Columbus. Tried to build to the latter place as well and to Cincinnati, but failed and only opened Jeffersonville to Sedalia (now Midway) and from McKay's Station to Kingman.
- Springfield, South Charleston, Washington Court House and Chillicothe Traction - 1904 proposed an electric interurban line from Springfield to Chillicothe but was only able to complete to South Charleston. Tried again in 1908 to get to Washington Court House only, but to no avail.
- Toledo, Angola and Western Railway - began 1902 on a steam road from Toledo to Angola, Indiana, but only managed to finish a short quarry line to Silica.
- Toledo, Delphos and Indianapolis Railway - began a narrow gauge line from Toledo to Indianapolis. Built Holgate through Delphos to the Indiana state line north-west of Celina, but was not opened west of Rockford (formerly Shanes Crossing). North of Delphos went to the Toledo, St. Louis and Western Railroad, south to the Cincinnati, Hamilton and Dayton Railway.
- Toledo and Indiana Railway - opened 1905 from Toledo to Bryan, but got no further. The best of several attempts to extend into Indiana came from the Fort Wayne and Toledo Electric Railway grading between Fort Wayne towards Bryant. The T&I tried to take this work over after the FW&T failed after 1913, with a line from Delta via Napoleon and Defiance instead of Bryan.
- Toledo and Western Railway - built 1903 from Toledo to Pioneer and graded in the direction of Angola in the hope of connecting with the Northern Indiana Railway and creating a through interurban route from Toledo to Chicago. Part of this grade was used by the St Joseph Valley Railway which had the same idea.

==== Oklahoma ====
- Denver, Wichita and Memphis Railway - operated 1905 to 1910, a 14 miles (23 km) stub running south-east of Catoosa.
- Oklahoma, New Mexico and Pacific Railway - 1913 began a line from Ardmore to Lawton but only opened to Ringling. Incorporated a subsidiary, the Ringling and Oilfields Railway to build to Oklahoma City 1916, which opened a short stub to Healdton.
- Oklahoma-Southwestern Railway - 1920 began a line from Bristow to Okmulgee but only completed to Nuyaka.

==== Oregon ====
- Oregon Pacific Railroad - incorporated 1880 to build a line from the Pacific coast at Yaquina (now a ghost town) to Boise, Idaho. Opened to Idanha, graded to the Santiam Pass to establish a claim, also in the valley of the Malheur River. Bankrupt 1890.

==== Pennsylvania ====
- Allen Street Railway - opened an interurban trolley line between Nazareth and Bath in 1906, which also handled freight. Prevented from crossing a spur of the Lehigh and New England Railroad to the Penn-Dixie #5 Cement Plant, and had to operate in two sections.
- Altoona and Beech Creek Railroad - failed to complete an extension to Fallentimber in 1903.
- Chambersburg and Gettysburg Railroad - 1890 began a steam road from Conococheague near Chambersburg to Gettysburg but only completed to Wolf Hill, 10 miles (16 km). Operated briefly to Fayetteville, two miles (3.2 km), but was abandoned in 1893. Not to be confused with the following.
- Chambersburg and Gettysburg Electric Railway - 1903 began an electric interurban from Chambersburg to Gettysburg, but only opened to Caledonia State Park. Not on the same alignment as the previous.
- Chartiers Southern Railroad - began construction from Thompsonville to Waynesburg in 1906, but only managed to complete two separate branches extending a Pennsylvania Railroad line from Brownsville. These were Besco to Mather, and Crucible to Nemacolin. The uncompleted main line from Thompsonville to Mather was abandoned, and the route from Mather to Waynesburg was completed by the Monongahela Railway in 1930.
- Johnstown and Somerset Railway - 1921 tried to build an electric interurban from Johnstown to Somerset, but only opened to Jerome.
- Montgomery and Chester Electric Railway - 1899 built a trolley line from Phoenixville to Spring City and by 1915 graded to a connection with the Pottstown Passenger Railway (the Pottstown streetcar system) via Royersford.
- Mount Pleasant and Latrobe Railroad - began 1881 on a line from Mount Pleasant to Latrobe. Only opened a short spur to a coal mine.
- Pennsylvania Railroad - Oxford Road Branch of the Connecting Railway at Philadelphia was the completed stub of the Philadelphia, Bustleton and Trenton Railroad, intended to run to Fallsington via Bustleton. Work on the rest was done between 1893 and 1896 before being abandoned.
- Phoenixville, Valley Forge and Strafford Electric Railway - 1909 began to build from Phoenixville to Strafford via Valley Forge, but only opened to the latter place.
- Pittsburg and Eastern Railroad - began 1895 to build from Mahaffey to West Newton, as a way for the New York Central Railroad (NYC) to get into Pittsburgh. Work was begun on the section to Saltsburg. Only opened to Arcadia as a coal-mine extension of the Beech Creek Railroad NYC subsidiary.
- Scranton, Montrose and Binghamton Railroad - only completed from Scranton to its branch to Montrose, but failed to finish to Binghamton, New York.
- Shady Gap Railroad - 1885 graded from Orbsonia on the East Broad Top Railroad and Coal Company (EBT) to Burnt Cabins and interchange with the South Pennsylvania Railroad, but only opened eventually to Neelyton as part of the EBT.

==== South Carolina ====
- Augusta Northern Railway - intended as a trunk line from Spartansburg to Augusta, Georgia, via Whitmire, Newberry and Saluda but only completed a dead-end short line to the last named from Ward in 1912.
- Blue Ridge Railroad of South Carolina - began 1852 on a line from Anderson to Knoxville, Tennessee, but only eventually opened to Walhalla. The uncompleted portion includes several tunnels, including the Stumphouse Mountain Tunnel.
- Charlotte, Monroe and Columbia Railroad - began 1901 to build from McBee to Monroe, North Carolina, but dead-ended at Jefferson.
- Chesterfield and Lancaster Railroad - began 1900 to build from Cheraw to Lancaster, but only opened to Crowburk just beyond Pageland.

==== South Dakota ====
- Aberdeen, Bismarck and North Western Railroad - graded a line from Aberdeen to Bismarck, North Dakota 1887, but did not lay track. Taken over by the Minneapolis, St. Paul and Sault Ste. Marie Railroad 1888, which only laid track on the North Dakota portion. Aberdeen to Leola went to the Minneapolis and St. Louis Railway 1906, Leola to Long Lake to the Mound City and Eastern Railway 1929 but Long Lake to Ashley, North Dakota, was never used.
- Aberdeen, Fergus Falls and Pierre Railroad - 1886 began a railroad from Pierre via Aberdeen to Fergus Falls, Minnesota. Aberdeen to Rutland became a line of the Great Northern Railway (U.S.) but grading from Aberdeen to Pierre was abandoned.
- Minneapolis and St. Louis Railway -Pacific Extension - a beginning was made 1908 on a bridge over the Missouri River at Lebeau and a line westwards in the direction of Broadus, Montana. The north-west corner of South Dakota with the south-east one of Montana were to remain a railroad-free zone, however.
- Mound City and Eastern Railway - opened 1929 from Leola to Long Lake, and left abandoned grading on the route to Mound City which it never reached.

==== Tennessee ====
- Chicago, Memphis and Gulf Railroad - the Hickman Division of the Illinois Central Railroad (IC) from Dyersburg to Hickman, Kentucky, was begun in 1909 as part of a low-level trunk line from Memphis to the Metropolis Bridge over the Ohio River near Paducah, Kentucky, via Clinton, Kentucky, and Moscow, Kentucky. The IC was still promoting the scheme in 1915.
- Decatur, Chesapeake and New Orleans Railway - began 1889 to build a trunk line from Gallatin to Decatur, Alabama, via Shelbyville and Fayetteville. The line was complete between the last two places and awaiting rails on bankruptcy. The Middle Tennessee and Alabama Railroad took over in 1893 and concentrated on the Fayetteville to Decatur portion, but this only eventually reached a dead end at Capshaw, Alabama.
- Duck River Valley Narrow Gauge Railway - 1877 began a narrow-gauge line from a port on the Tennessee River at Johnsonville to Fayetteville via Centerville and Columbia. Only completed from Columbia to Fayetteville.
- Knoxville and Charleston Railroad - 1867 began a trunk line from Knoxville to Charleston, South Carolina, but only reached Maryville. Became the Knoxville and Augusta Railroad 1879. There was never to be a railroad through the Deals Gap Pass, despite several other attempts. The Tennessee & Carolina Southern Railway used abandoned grade to get to Calderwood in 1924, but no further.
- Middle and East Tennessee Central Railway - began 1883 on a line from the Chesapeake and Nashville Railway near Bethpage to Knoxville, but only completed to Hartsville.
- Oneida and Western Railroad - began a line 1913 from Oneida to Albany, Kentucky, but only opened to Jamestown.
- Tennessee Midland Railroad - 1888 began a direct-route trunk line from Memphis to Bristol but only completed to Perryville.
- Tennessee and Sequatchie Valley Railroad - 1882 began a narrow gauge line from a landing on the Tennessee River near Spring City to Nashville. Claimed to have laid 42 miles (68 km) in 1883, when it went bankrupt. Succeeded by the Tennessee Central Railroad (nothing to do with the Tennessee Central Railway) which had track from Rhea (now drowned by a reservoir) through Spring City and Jewett to Litton in 1889 but only operated Spring City to Jewett, 12 miles (19 km).
- Troy and Tiptonville Railroad - 1887 began a line from Moffat south-east of Rives to Tiptonville via Troy but only opened to the latter.

==== Texas ====
- Beaumont and Great Northern Railroad - the Orphan Line between Livingston and Weldon, a detached portion of the Missouri–Kansas–Texas Railroad, was a fragment of a trunk line scheme begun 1905 between Beaumont and Waco. Another attempt was made after the Katy dumped the line, as the Waco, Beaumont, Trinity and Sabine Railway in 1923.
- Corpus Christi Street and Interurban Railway - the streetcar company of Corpus Christi had this name because it began to build an interurban electric line to Ward Island in 1916.
- Denison, Bonham and New Orleans Railroad - 1901 was building between its terminus at Bonham and Wolfe City.
- Eastland, Wichita Falls and Gulf Railway - 1918 began a line from May, the terminus of the Brownwood North and South Railway, to Newcastle via Mangum and Breckwalker south of Breckenridge. Only opened Mangum to Breckwalker.
- Fort Worth and Rio Grande Railway - 1885 set out to build a trunk line from Fort Worth to Eagle Pass with a branch to San Antonio. The hope was to reach the Pacific coast at Topolobampo in Mexico. Only eventually completed to a dead end at Menard.
- Galveston, Brazos and Colorado Narrow Gauge Railway - began 1875 to build a narrow-gauge railroad from Galveston along the length of the island to a bridge over the San Luis Pass, then along the Colorado River to Austin. Only built fifteen miles (24 km) from Galveston to a place (now gone) called Seaforth. Taken over by the Galveston and Western Railway in 1888.
- Greenville Northwestern Railway - 1913 began to build an interurban electric line from Anna to Greenville via Blue Ridge but only opened to the latter place and never electrified.
- Gulf and Brazos Valley Railway - began 1897 on a line from Peck City on the Texas and Pacific Railway south of Mineral Wells to the Chicago, Rock Island and Pacific Railroad at Stoneburg. Only opened a stub from Peck City to Mineral Wells 1900, but this was in direct competition with the Weatherford, Mineral Wells and Northwestern Railway and was abandoned 1903.
- Gulf, Texas and Western Railway - 1910 was building from Lubbock to Dallas via Benjamin, Seymour, Jacksboro and Boonville with a branch from the last named to Fort Worth. Graded Benjamin to Seymour, opened Seymour to Jacksboro then built from there to the Weatherford, Mineral Wells and Northwestern Railway at Salesville on a new alignment -and gave up on the rest. Boonville to Dallas was to have used the unused grade of the Dallas and New Mexico Railway.
- Kansas City, Mexico and Orient Railway - Del Rio Branch - 1909 began a line from San Angelo to Del Rio to connect with the Mexican International Railroad at Ciudad Acuña in order to create a trunk route to Mexico City. Only opened eventually to a dead end at Sonora in 1930.
- Paris, Marshall and Sabine Pass Railway the line between Winnsboro and Elysian Fields via Marshall was a completed fragment of a trunk line scheme between Paris and the Sabine Pass. Begun 1888, had very many changes of name and ended as the Marshall and East Texas Railway.
- Quanah, Acme and Pacific Railway - was intended to go to El Paso, and be the means for the St. Louis–San Francisco Railway to become a transcontinental railroad. This proposal was shown on publicity material until 1928, when Floydada was settled on as a destination.
- Rio Grande and Eagle Pass Railway - began 1885 on a line from Laredo to Eagle Pass but only opened to Santo Tomás.
- Rio Grande Northern Railroad - 1893 began a line from Van Horn via Chispa on the Southern Pacific Railroad south of Lobo and San Carlos (now a ghost town) to the Rio Grande at Sanchez Ranch. Only a spur from Chispa to a new coal mine at San Carlos was finished in 1895, but the company did not operate. The San Carlos Coal Company hired a locomotive on its own account to haul out a very few cars of coal before it failed and everything was junked in 1897. The line had a tunnel.
- Peach River and Gulf Railway - 1904 proposed a line from Willis to Beaumont which would have given the International–Great Northern Railroad a route to the latter city. Only operated a lumber line at Timber on the Gulf, Colorado and Santa Fe Railway.
- Riverside and Gulf Railway - 1907 proposed a line from Livingston to Wallisville (which was then a port) via Milvid on the Gulf, Colorado and Santa Fe Railway. Only operated a logging line at the latter place until 1914.
- Oklahoma, Red River and Texas Railway - 1910 started building from Blossom to Mineola but only opened to Deport.
- Texas Western Narrow Gauge Railway Company - 1872 began a line from Houston to Presidio on the Rio Grande. Reached Sealy.
- Trinity, Cameron and Western Railroad - 1892 set out to build from west from Cameron to Austin via Granger and Georgetown. Granger to Austin became part of the Missouri–Kansas–Texas Railroad, but work nearer Cameron was abandoned. Eastwards, the hope was to build to Trinity.

==== Utah ====
- Castle Valley Railway - begun 1901 as part of a cut-off between the Union Pacific Railroad at Milford and the Denver and Rio Grande Western Railroad near Green River. The later built from Salina eastwards, but only completed to Nioche in 1903. The line was damaged by flooding in 1903 and never had revenue service. Restoration was attempted 1913 and 1925, but the only revenue trains were from a coal mine at Crystal between 1929 and 1933. The route was to have been used by the California and Nevada Railroad, the 1884 proposed narrow-gauge transcontinental line.
- Salt Lake and Los Angeles Railway - took over a short line from Salt Lake City to Saltair in 1892, and intended to extend to Ophir in the first instance by using the grade of the Utah Western Railway (1874-1881) to Stockton (the Los Angeles and Salt Lake Railroad was in the future). Achieved nothing. Became Salt Lake, Garfield and Western Railway in 1916, electrified and tried to build into Garfield but could not cross the trunk line tracks at grade to reach downtown.
- Sevier Railway - began 1891 to build from Manti to Parowan but only opened to Marysvale.
- Uintah Railway - intended to build a connection with the Denver and Salt Lake Railway at Vernal, and a station was provided for it there in 1905.
- Utah Eastern Railroad - 1880 began a narrow-gauge line from Coalville to Salt Lake City via Park City in competition with the Union Pacific Railroad (UP). Only opened Coalville to Park City, but the UP simultaneously opened a closely parallel standard-gauge branch between the same two places which made the small company's situation hopeless. The UP bought it out in 1883 to get rid of it.

==== Virginia ====
- Blackstone and Lunenburg Railroad - 1905 began a line from Blackstone to Lunenburg but only opened to Dillard and became a short Norfolk and Western Railway branch.
- Smithfield Terminal Railway - began 1948 to build a small network of industrial lines at Smithfield to serve three meat packing plants from a ferry pier. The line had no access to the main railroad system, but relied on a car float from the Chesapeake and Ohio Railway terminal at Newport News. Bankrupt and scrapped within a year, after laying one mile of track.

==== Washington State ====
- Northern Pacific Railway - Ellensburg Cut-off - the dead-end line from Warden to Schrag was a completed stub of a trunk line cut-off from Ritzville to Ellensburg 1909. Abandoned grading exists between Schrag and Ritzville.
- Oregon and Washington Railroad - this Union Pacific Railroad subsidiary began 1906 a line from Vancouver to Tacoma and Seattle, a repeat of the Portland and Puget Sound Railroad scheme (see below). A long tunnel under Tacoma to reach the waterfront was begun in 1909 but failed, and so the UP arranged trackage on the parallel Northern Pacific Railway instead of continuing to build from Vancouver. Reciprocal arrangements were made with the Chicago, Milwaukee, St. Paul and Pacific Railroad to get to Seattle from Tacoma, but a new line with a tunnel under the city to a marine terminal on Salmon Bay was begun. Both tunnels were abandoned and sealed off. This was UP's third attempt at a Tacoma line.
- Portland and Puget Sound Railroad - 1891 this Union Pacific Railroad subsidiary began a trunk line between what is now the Burlington Northern Railroad Bridge 5.1 at Portland, Oregon, and Mukilteo via Tacoma and Seattle. The bridge was begun, and much grading between Vancouver and Tacoma, which was approached from due south. Work done was purchased 1902 by the Northern Pacific Railway which finished the bridge and the line from there to Kalama. This was the first of three attempts by the UP to get to Tacoma.
- Tacoma and Columbia River Railway - began work 1895 on a trunk line from Tacoma to The Dalles on the Oregon Railroad and Navigation Company (an affiliate of the Union Pacific Railroad). Took over two small suburban lines in Tacoma: Tacoma and Lake City Railroad and Navigation from 6th St & Union Ave to American Lake (already owned by UP), and Tacoma, Lake Park and Columbia River from Center Street to Spanaway (Lake Park). Was extending former to a proposed deep water port at Steilacoom, and the latter as the main line which reached a location called Terminus before abandonment 1901. Some of the grades went to trolley lines, terminating at Spanaway, American Lake and Stellacoom. This was UP's second attempt at a Tacoma line.
- Vancouver, Klickitat and Yakima Railroad - 1888 began a line from Vancouver to Yakima via the Klickitat Pass. Only eventually managed a dead-end line to Yacolt.

==== West Virginia ====
- Parkersburg and Ohio Valley Electric Railway - began 1903 to build a major electric interurban between Wheeling and Parkersburg. Opened five miles (8.0 km) between Sistersville and Friendly. The latter place was claimed as one of the smallest settlements in the USA with a dedicated interurban service, since it only had 217 residents at the time.

==== Wisconsin ====
- Cazenovia Southern Railroad - 1907 intended to connect Cazenovia with Lone Rock, Sauk City and La Valle, but only reached the last place.

==== Wyoming ====
- Laramie, North Park and Pacific Railroad and Telegraph Company - 1880 began a line from Laramie through Medicine Bow in the hope of connecting to a proposed line to Grand Junction, Colorado, but only reached Soda Lake.
- Wyoming North and South Railroad - 1923 proposed a trunk line from Regina, Saskatchewan, Canada to Craig, Colorado, via Miles City, Montana, Sheridan and Casper. Only opened Casper to Midwest but graded towards Sheridan and into Montana before bankruptcy in 1924.

== Military railway facilities ==
The following abortive projects were intended for the use of armed forces.

=== Australia ===
(Australia)

- During World War II a number of extra crossing loops were built between Werris Creek and Wallangarra, but were not brought into use.
- During World War II triangle junctions were built at Griffith, Stockinbingal, which were removed soon after the war. A triangle at Goobang Junction near Parkes from west to south was only partly built. It was finally completed around 2000.

=== Germany ===
(Germany)

- Strategic Railway Embankment – The German government ordered the construction of a dedicated military railway in 1904, running from the Ruhr towards the western border of Germany. This was solely in order to enable the rapid deployment of troops. The project was never completed.

== Construction interrupted for decades ==
The following projects were completed long after initial abandonment.

=== Australia ===
(Australia)

- New South Wales Railways – Sandy Hollow–Maryvale railway was commenced in the 1930s, when construction was suspended for decades. The section from Sandy Hollow to Gulgong was completed in the 1980s.
- The Ghan – the project to build a south-to-north Australian transcontinental railway was begun in 1878 at Port Augusta, but only reached Alice Springs as a narrow-gauge line in 1930. There it stalled until 1980, when a new standard-gauge line on a different route was opened. This was extended to Darwin, Northern Territory in 2004, 126 years after work had started.

=== Mexico ===
(Mexico)

- Ferrocarril Kansas City, Mexico y Oriente – this Mexican subsidiary of the Kansas City, Mexico and Orient Railway was to have been part of a trunk line from Kansas City to the Pacific port of Topolobampo. When the company went bankrupt in 1912 it had built three separate sections between Topolobampo and Presidio, Texas: Pacific Division between Topolobampo and El Fuerte, Mountain Division between Sánchez and Miñaca and Chihuahua Division between Chihuahua City and Marquéz. El Fuerte to Sánchez only opened in 1961 as part of the Ferrocarril Chihuahua al Pacífico, and Marquéz to Presidio opened in 1930.

=== United Kingdom ===
(United Kingdom)

- Channel Tunnel – tunnelling began in 1881 for a year, was resumed in 1988 and the tunnel finally opened in 1994.
- National Coal Board
  - Calverton Colliery was opened in 1951, and its railway used the abandoned route of the Mid-Nottinghamshire Joint Railway from Bestwood Park Junction, left uncompleted 1931.
  - Abernant Colliery was opened in 1956, and its railway used the uncompleted line abandoned by the Great Western Railway south of Gwaun-Cae-Gurwen in 1923.
- Surrey and Sussex Junction Railway – this subsidiary of the London, Brighton and South Coast Railway did substantial work on a line from Croydon to Tunbridge Wells in 1864, but was abandoned without rails being laid. In 1884, the project was revived and completed: it is now the Oxted line.

== Unused infrastructure improvements ==
The following projects resulted in abortive improvements to existing railways.

=== Provided for unfulfilled future needs ===
==== Australia ====
(Australia)

- Central railway station, Sydney, platforms 26 and 27.
- St James railway station, Sydney, platforms 2 and 3.
- North Sydney railway station, flying junction tunnel for never built line to Manly.
- Wynyard platforms 1 and 2 to North Sydney never used for rail, used for trams, then converted to car parking use.
- North Sydney to Chatswood four-tracking, partially built never used.
- Redfern to Sydenham six-tracking, partially built, never completed.
- Overbridge on A4085.

==== United Kingdom ====
(United Kingdom)

- Great Central Railway – built its Marylebone station terminus building in London at twice the width of the platforms behind. This was to accommodate extra platforms when traffic expanded, which never happened. The London Extension was built with two tracks, but engineered for a future four. The two west-facing junction curves on it connecting to the East and West Junction Railway were double-track, but that railway was single-track meaning that the junction at Byfield, Northamptonshire had five tracks merging into one.
- Caledonian Railway
  - The Leith New Lines opened in 1903 and had passenger stations at Newhaven, Ferry Road, Leith Walk and Seafield which were never used.
  - Paisley and Barrhead District Railway – two lines flanking the west and east sides of Paisley met at Barrhead and continued to Lyoncross. Passenger services were planned, but when the system was opened in 1905 they were not inaugurated because of anticipated tramway competition. Passenger stations built but never used were Ferguslie, Staneley, Glenfield, Paisley East, Dykebar, Barrhead (New) and Barrhead South. The triangular junction at Paisley East was never used.
- Elham Valley Railway – opened 1889, between Canterbury West and Folkestone West. The only traffic was between Canterbury and Folkestone with the small villages in between, since it formed part of no through route. It was, however, built with double track. The second track was completely redundant, since a single passing place sufficed.
- Hull and Barnsley and Great Central Joint Railway – planned passenger services to a new terminus at Doncaster (York Road) with stations at Snaith and Pollington, Sykehouse, Thorpe-in-Balne and Warmsworth. The line opened 1916, but no passenger service was ever provided.
- London, Chatham and Dover Railway – built a terminus station at Margate in 1864, separate from its main station, for an intensive local service to Ramsgate via Broadstairs. This was never inaugurated, and the unused station eventually became the core of the Dreamland Amusement Park.
- London and South Western Railway
  - Meon Valley Line – was built as a main line connecting the towns of Gosport and Fareham with London. Opened in 1903; engineered for double track although only one was provided. The main line service was a failure, and through trains were withdrawn in 1915. The track was never doubled.
  - Nile Valley Line – was intended as part of a trunk line between Southampton and Birmingham via a junction at Whitchurch with the Didcot, Newbury and Southampton Railway, and was engineered accordingly. The DN&SR refused to build the authorised junction spur at Whitchurch, choosing to build to Southampton instead (it failed to complete), and the Nile Valley Line was left with very limited local traffic.
- London Underground, Aldwych to Holborn line – opened 1907. This very short tube line had two tunnels, two platforms at either end, three lift (elevator) shafts and two lift-to-platform corridors. Two of the shafts and one of the corridors were never used, and the eastern tunnel with one from each pair of platforms was abandoned in 1914.
- Midland Railway – the Yeadon branch to Yeadon, West Yorkshire was provided with a fully fitted passenger station on completion in 1894, which never saw a train service.

=== Interrupted by outbreak of war ===
==== Germany ====
(Germany)

- Freilassing–Berchtesgaden railway – work was suspended on double-tracking in 1938, and part of line left with work uncompleted was abandoned and replaced with a bus service.

==== United Kingdom ====
(United Kingdom)

- London, Brighton and South Coast Railway – quadrupling of its main line from London to Brighton. Work had reached the north portal of Balcombe tunnel by 1914, and land purchased for the portal of the new bore. The Southern Railway abandoned the project, and left the rest of the line double-track.
- London Underground
  - Extension of Central line to Denham along a pre-existing Great Western Railway line was curtailed by World War II, and only completed to West Ruislip station in 1948.
  - Extension of Northern line by electrifying pre-existing railways from Finsbury Park station to Edgware with a branch to Alexandra Palace was suspended 1940 owing to World War II. Work abandoned 1953, except for short branch to Mill Hill East.

== Failed motive power systems ==
Work was done on prototypes of the following newly invented motive power systems, which proved to be failures by either not entering commercial operation at all or needing speedy abandonment once installed.

=== France ===
(France)

- Aérotrain – a hover monorail system was developed between 1965 and 1977 by Jean Bertin. Four experimental tracks (one in the USA) and five prototypes were built before abandonment.

=== Germany ===
(Germany)

- Scherl Monorail – the German publisher August Scherl arranged a one-day demonstration of a Gyro monorail at the Berlin Zoological Garden on 10 November 1909. The small railcar stayed on one rail owing to the conservation of angular momentum supplied by two heavy horizontal flywheels rotating in opposite directions. No investor interest was forthcoming. See Shilovsky Monorail and Brennan Monorail below.

=== Russia ===
(Russia)

- Shilovsky Monorail – the Russian aristocrat Pyotr Shilovsky was developing his gyro transit system after 1910, both for road vehicles in England and for monorail in Russia. For a gyrocar his system was dangerous because it involved only one flywheel, and so vehicles were unstable on bends. A gyro monorail railway project was begun in 1922 by the nascent Soviet Union between St Petersburg and Tsarskoye Selo, but funding was pulled after construction began.

=== United Kingdom ===
(United Kingdom)

- Atmospheric Railway – the Samuda and Clegg System was developed from 1838 and initially used by the London and Croydon Railway and the South Devon Railway Company. It involved an iron pipe containing a piston attached by a rod to the train, which was pulled along by pumping the air out of the pipe in front of the piston. This was a materials technology failure, since the continuous valve containing the piston rod was sealed by leather which quickly perished. Also used on the Dalkey Atmospheric Railway in Ireland, and the Paris to Saint-Germain Railway in France.
- Bennie Railplane – George Bennie opened a short prototype demonstration line of his elevated monorail system in 1930, at Milngavie in Scotland. The individual cars hung on a single rail, with guide rails underneath. The propulsion was by propeller, hence the name. The idea was to build lines above conventional railways, and use them for fast passenger traffic. The idea attracted no investment, and Bennie went bankrupt in 1937.
- Behr Monorail – Fritz Behr developed the successful Lartigue Monorail system to create a high-speed electric monorail, which he demonstrated as a full-scale model at the Brussels International Exposition (1897). As a result, the Manchester and Liverpool Electric Express Railway was authorised in 1901 to run between the two cities via Eccles and Warrington. Only minor preliminary work was done, as Behr could not attract funding.
- Brennan Monorail – Louis Brennan patented his monorail system in 1903. This was a gyro monorail, whereby the train stayed on one rail owing to the conservation of angular momentum supplied by a pair of heavy vertical flywheels, rotating in opposite directions. He demonstrated a full-sized model at the Japan–British Exhibition of 1910, and photos taken of the two trains were widely circulated. He failed to attract backers, and abandoned work.
- Great Eastern Railway, Decapod – the GER did not have the funds to electrify its London suburban lines at the start of the 20th century, so instructed its motive power department to create a steam engine (locomotive) that could match the speed and acceleration of an electric train and so take charge of these services. The result was a ten-wheel (0-5-0) monster. Unfortunately the permanent way department was not consulted, and the engine was too heavy for both track and bridges. Only the prototype was built, and hauled no revenue train before being rebuilt for goods (freight) service.
- Kearney High-Speed Tube – Elfric Wells Chalmers Kearney promoted his monorail underground rapid transit system from 1905 to the 1940s in Britain and elsewhere, but only a single prototype passenger car was built.
- Rammell Pneumatic Railway – Thomas Webster Rammell was the engineer for the London Pneumatic Despatch Company, which involved cars being pushed along underground tubes by stationary air pumps. He demonstrated a passenger version at Crystal Palace in 1864, as a prototype subway system. This involved a carriage in a large tube with a ring of bristles at one end forming a seal, being moved back and forth by alternately pumping in and extracting the air in the tube. The system was taken up by the failed Waterloo and Whitehall Railway.
- Ro-Railer – in 1931 the Karrier Company built an experimental single-decker bus with a wheel arrangement that allowed it to run both on roads and on rails. The wheels needed to be adjusted when transferring from one to the other. It ran a brief scheduled London, Midland and Scottish Railway service in 1932 from Blisworth railway station to Stratford Old Town railway station over the former Stratford-upon-Avon and Midland Junction Railway, then by road to the Welcombe Hotel. The service was abandoned after a few weeks when an axle broke.

=== United States ===
(United States)

- Beach Pneumatic Transit – this was the first attempt to build an underground public transit system in New York City. The system was developed by Alfred Ely Beach in 1869, and a short demonstration subway line running on pneumatic power was opened in 1870. It was abandoned in 1873. The independently developed Rammell Pneumatic Railway (see above) in England was very similar.
- Boynton Bicycle Railroad – after a successful demonstration under steam of this monorail system at Coney Island, in 1894 a demonstration electric line was built between Bellport and East Patchogue as the first section of a proposed suburban system on Long Island. Nothing further was achieved.
- Centennial Monorail – this was similar to the relatively successful Lartigue Monorail system, but independently developed in the US. The inventor Roy Stone demonstrated it at the Centennial International Exhibition of 1876, which was held in Philadelphia (Pennsylvania) to celebrate the 100th anniversary of the Declaration of Independence. The system was used for the Bradford and Foster Brook Railway, opened 1878 and abandoned in a year after a train wreck and boiler explosion.
- Macke's Three-Rail System – this three-rail elevated urban rapid transit system was proposed for Boston between 1888 and 1891, and discussed by the Massachusetts state legislature. Unlike its competitor the Meigs system (see below), no demonstration line was built. It features two load-bearing rails and a third traction rail in a gully between the two, with vertical driving wheels attached to the rail by wrap-round flanges.
- Meigs Elevated Railway – this elevated steam-powered urban rapid transit system is often described as a monorail but was technically pre-electric third rail. It was invented in by Josiah Vincent Meigs (also known as Joe Meigs or Joe Vincent Meigs), of Lowell, Massachusetts, and was demonstrated on a short experimental line in a suburb of Boston called East Cambridge from 1886 to 1894.
- Miami and Erie Transportation Company – the Miami and Erie Canal ran from Cincinnati to Toledo, Ohio, and like all canals in the 19th century relied on horses and mules to tow the boats. The idea was floated to replace the animals with electric locomotives, running on rails laid on the towpath (Electric Mules). Rails were laid from Cincinnati through Dayton by 1904. The idea failed in general because of the new availability of internal combustion engines to power boats, and specifically because the canal was already moribund.
- Tunis Monorail – the inventor Howard Hansel Tunis demonstrated his monorail system the Jamestown (Virginia) exposition of 1907, and this was used for the Pelham Park and City Island Railway which was a New York suburban transit line. The monorail had s single ground rail, and two elevated guide rails. It ran from 1910 to 1914, and was then replaced by conventional streetcars.
