= Fereneze Braes =

Hills in East Renfrewshire, Scotland

Coordinates: 55°47′55″N 04°25′18″W

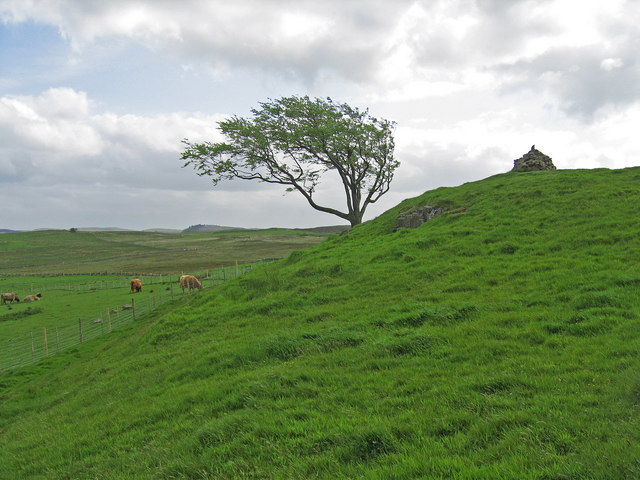
- Cairn west of Fereneze Golf Club

Highest point
- Peak: Killoch Hill
- Elevation: 223 m (732 ft)
- Parent peak: Neilston Pad

Dimensions
- Length: 7.5 km (4.7 mi)

Geography
- Country: Scotland
- Town: Neilston, Barrhead

Climbing
- Access: Neilston, Barrhead, Uplawmoor

The Fereneze Braes are a range of hills in East Renfrewshire, Scotland, just southwest of the city of Glasgow. The braes lie to the west of the town of Barrhead and the north of neighbouring Neilston, stretching south-west toward Uplawmoor. The braes are contiguous with the Gleniffer Braes to the north, and the two meet where Barrhead meets Paisley. Rising to more than 220 m (720 ft) in elevation, the hills are prominently visible from much of Glasgow and East Renfrewshire.

== Etymology ==
The name Fereneze has multiple purported etymologies. One proposed explanation for the name is that it comes from "fir ness", the 'upland of firs'. Another, more recent, explanation is that Fereneze is a corruption of "fermison", a rendering of the Old French "fermeyson", the time of the year for hunting stags. Documents from the twelfth and thirteenth centuries detail landowner Walter I having granted the monks of Paisley a tenth of his venison alongside all of the skins of the hinds he obtained 'in fermison', with 'fermison' being misinterpreted as a place name, eventually becoming Ferrenes and the modern Fereneze.

== Area ==
The view from the top of the braes extends across not only Barrhead and Neilston but all of Glasgow and much of its surroundings. To the south, the Neilston Pad and Eaglesham Moor are visible, as well as further hills south-west entering Ayrshire. Northward, the Campsie Fells are visible and Cathkin Braes are visible in the east. Roads and housing hug the bottom of the hills in Barrhead, the expansion of which has been pursued multiple times, however the council and community campaigners (with the Save Fereneze campaign) have both worked to prevent this.

== Wildlife ==
Several plants considered to be rare in the area have been recorded in Killoch Glen, although the details of which are awaited by a more comprehensive survey.

== History ==
Parts of the hills are on occasion subject to wildfires; a large fire took place in a section of open grassland near Barrhead in 2019. Additionally, the green of the golf club is often targeted by intentional arson attacks, there having been 2 such incidents within a week in 2017.

== Recreation ==
Killoch Glen and the Killoch Water, a popular walking destination, run through the hills, and the Harelaw Reservoir, a popular fishing site owned by Scottish Water, is located on the plateau at their top. The braes are part of an established walking network, including a 5 mile walk between them and Barrhead and paths connecting them north to the Gleniffer Braes. An 18 hole golf course, Fereneze Golf Club, is located across much of the eastern end of the braes.

== See also ==
- Gleniffer Braes
- Cathkin Braes
- Dams to Darnley Country Park
