= Kirkton Burn =

River in East Renfrewshire, Scotland

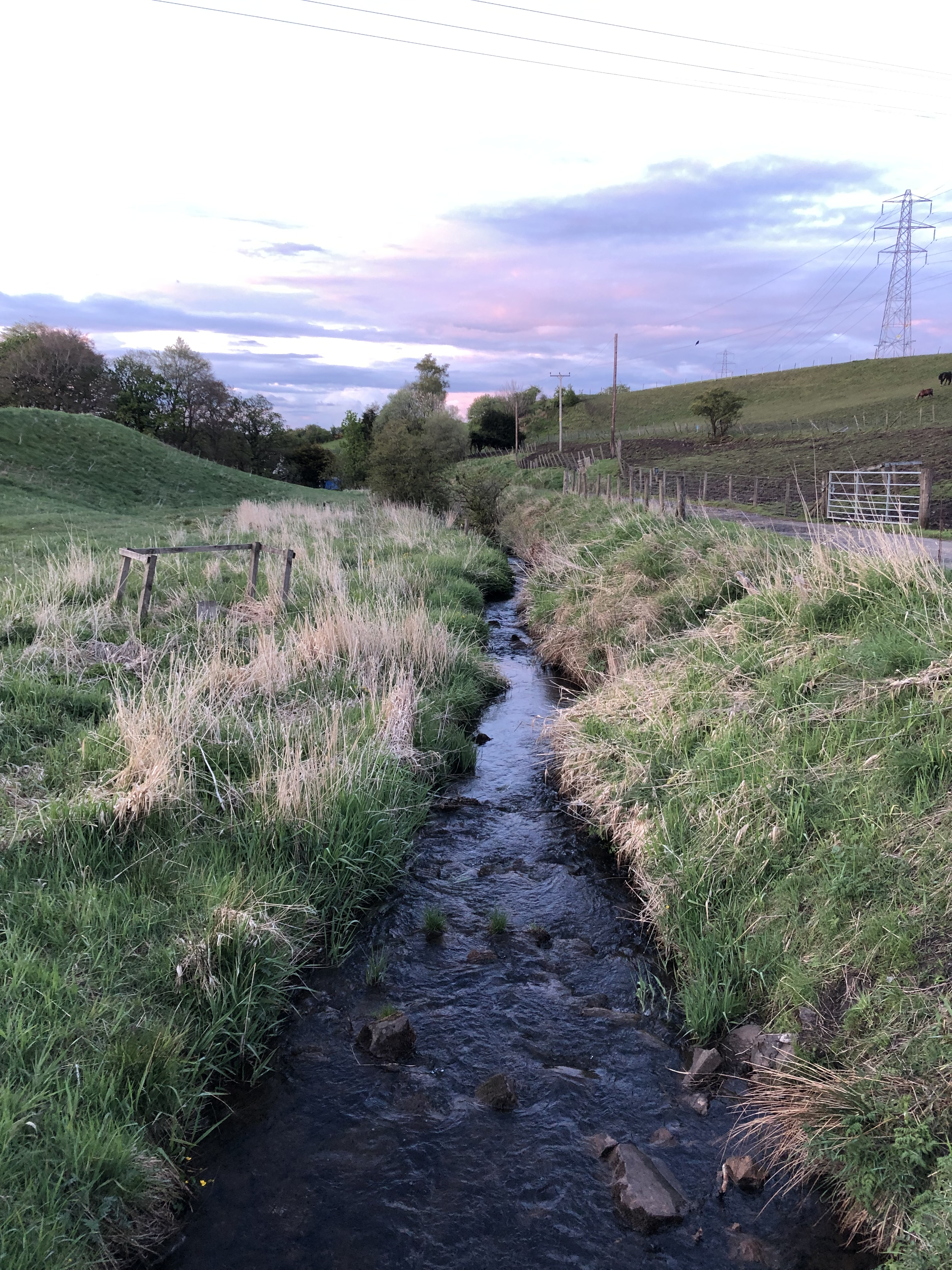
- Kirkton Burn from the stone bridge on Kirkton Road, Neilston

Location
- Country: Scotland

Physical characteristics
- Mouth: Levern Water
  - location: Barrhead, Scotland

Kirkton Burn is a burn in East Renfrewshire which rises to the south of Neilston Pad. It flows northeast through Snypes Dam and on to Nether Kirkton, to the east of Neilston. It continues northeast to Barrhead where it runs mostly in culverts before eventually joining Levern Water.

The burn originates in the land surrounding Neilston Pad, both northeast, and southwest. On the southeast, water is held in Craighall Reservoir, where after a short journey in Craig Burn, it flows into Kirkton Burn. In the northeast, water originates in the land of Loanfoot, Lo Walton, and High Walton farms, and flows into Snypes Dam.

Craighall Reservoir and Snypes Dam were constructed in 1817 and 1847–1849, respectively, to store floodwater that would ensure a constant supply of water to bleach works and mills situated on Kirkton Burn.

A third dam, Kirkton Dam, existed just off Kirkton Road but has since been drained.
