= Craighall Reservoir =

Reservoir in East Renfrewshire, Scotland

- Craighall Dam
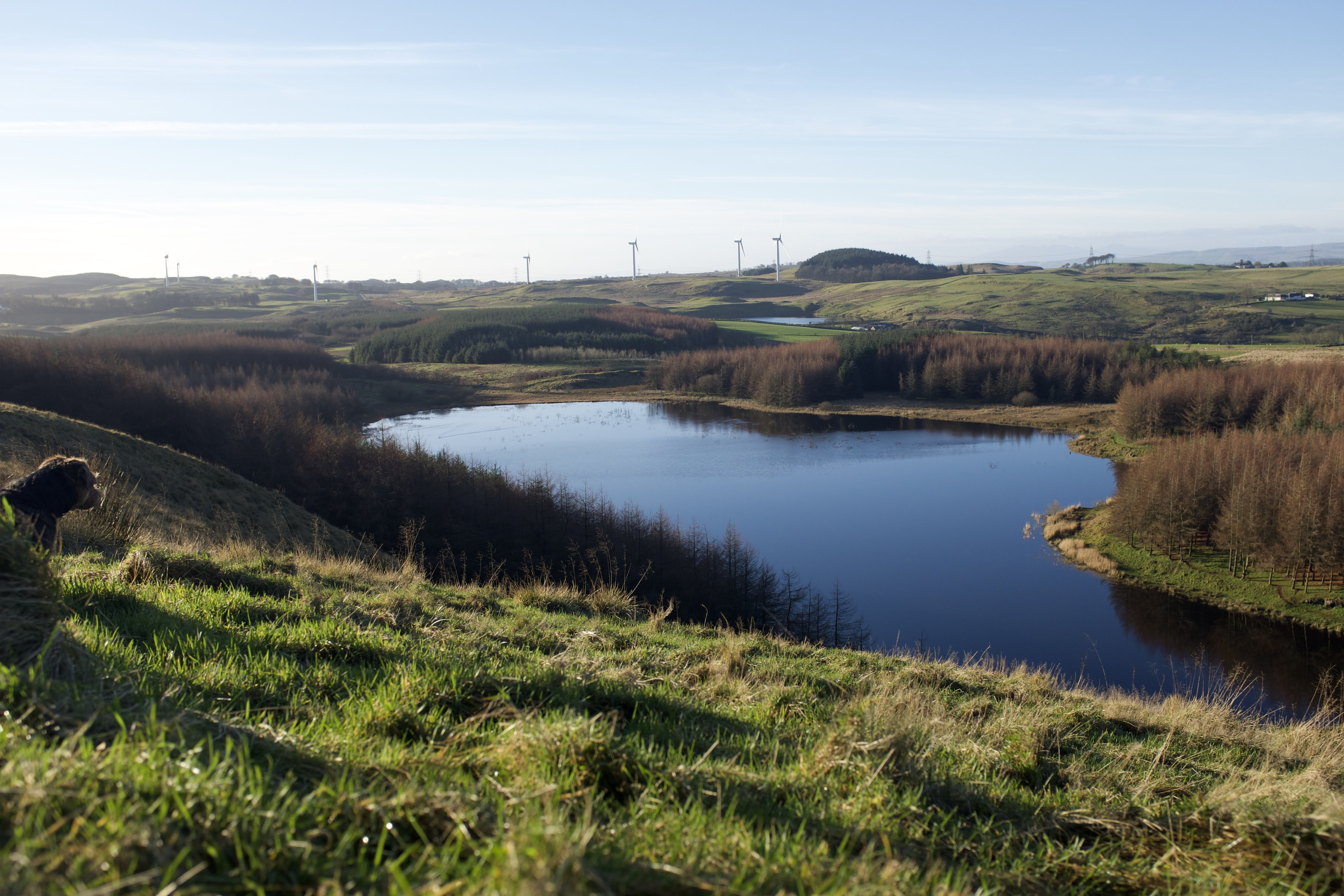
- Craighall Reservoir

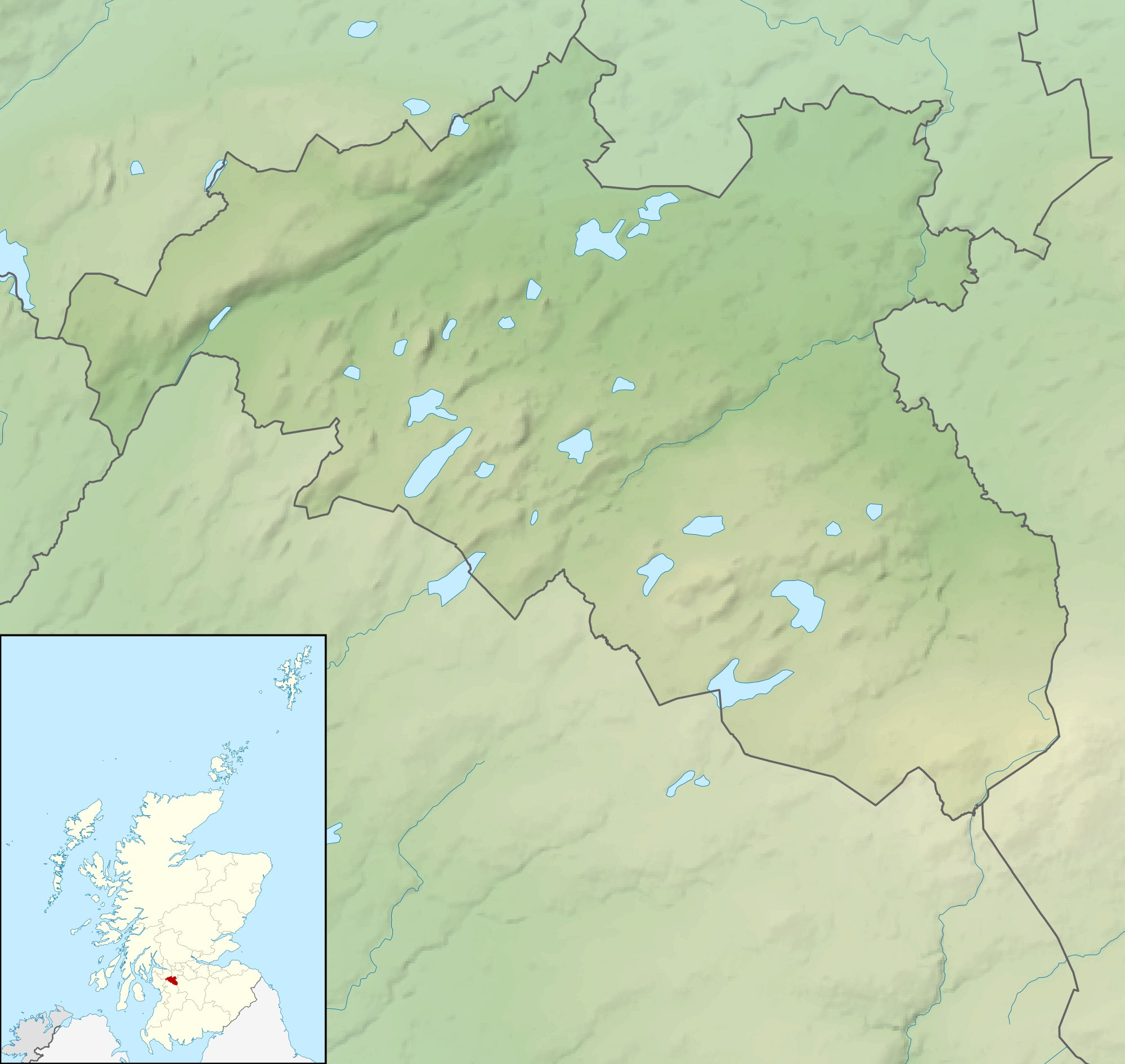
- Location within East Renfrewshire Location within Scotland
- Location: Neilston, Scotland
- Coordinates: 55.764117°N 4.437777°W
- Managing agency: Elderslie Estates
- Built: 1817

Craighall Reservoir, known locally as Craighall Dam, is one of a number of small reservoirs, situated around Neilston in East Renfrewshire, Scotland. The reservoir is located on the western slopes of Neilston Pad and has a number of well maintained public access paths. As of August 2020 it has an area of 5.9 hectares (0.059 km^{2}).

The reservoir was constructed in 1817 to store flood water that would ensure a constant supply of water to bleach works situated on Kirkton Burn. The reservoir flows into Craig Burn, a small stream which runs along the western side of Neilston Pad, past Craig o' Neilston farm before joining Kirkton Burn.

It first appeared on Ordnance Survey maps in 1856.

The reservoir is owned by Elderslie Estates.

== Features ==
The remains of a stone boathouse and small jetty are situated on the western embankment. The period of their construction is unknown.

During the 1980s the reservoir was drained and remained empty for a number of years. During this period a number of trees grew in the basin and when it was re-filled the trees became a noticeable characteristic poking through the surface of the water.

== Forestry ==
In 1995 the reservoir was a central focal point in the East Renfrewshire Community Woodland project carried out by Elderslie Estates. The project seen thousands of trees planted around the reservoir creating vast woodland.

In 2019 up to 20,000 of the trees were felled to prevent the spread of phytophthora ramorum – a fungus-like pathogen that can kill or severely damage larch trees. The felling damaged and disturbed a number of well utilised walking and access routes to the reservoir, most notably on the western side. Although many routes have reappeared the lack of protection from the woodland has caused the ground to retain much more water than it previously did resulting in some areas of marshland and in some cases small bodies of water.
