= Castlehead =

District of Paisley in Scotland

Coordinates: 55°50′17″N 4°25′59″W

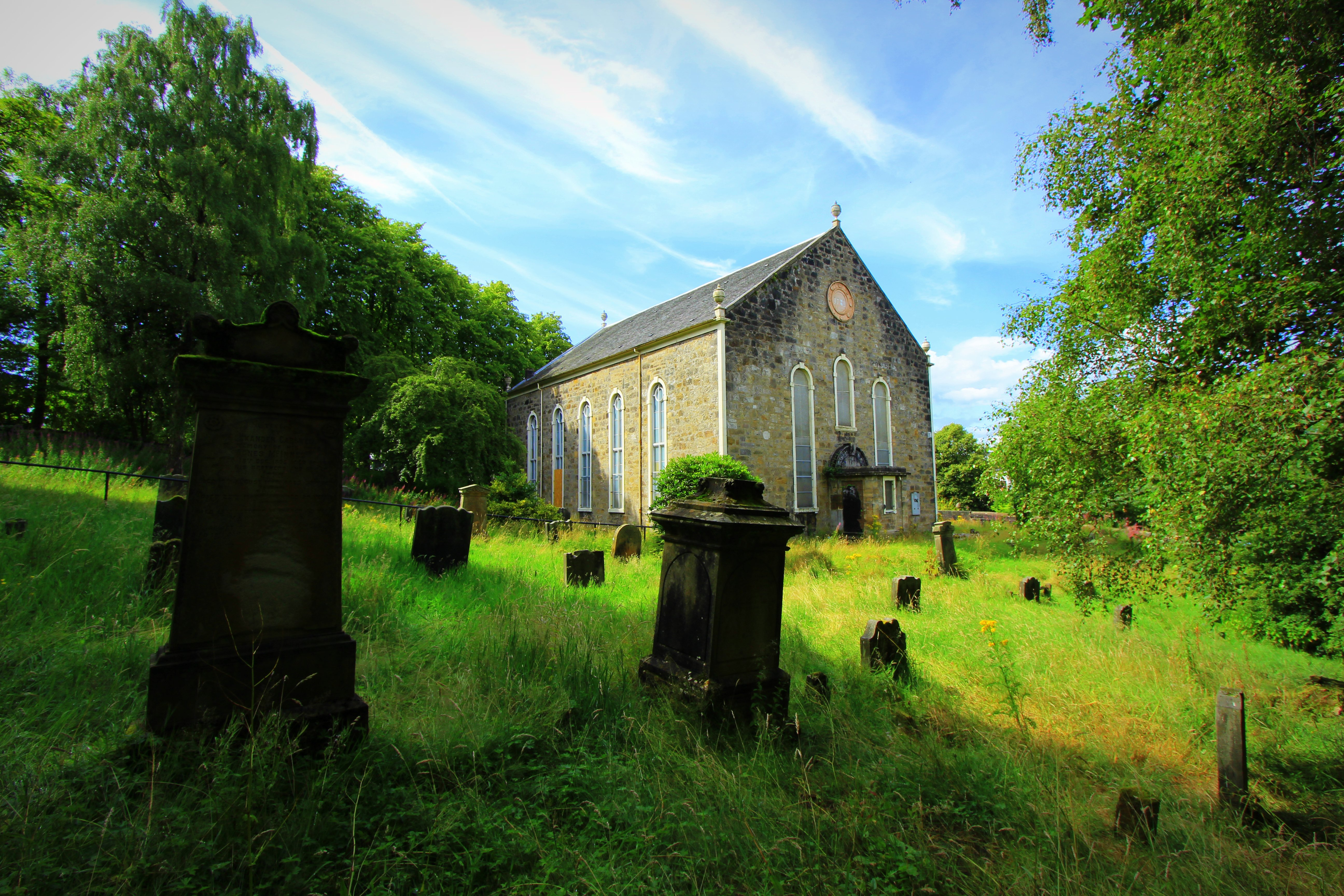
Castlehead Church from graveyard.

Castlehead is a district of Paisley in Scotland. It is a heavily wooded area of Victorian villas where many of Paisley's most influential industrialists and professionals made their homes as a nineteenth-century industrial boom town became overcrowded.

== Early history ==
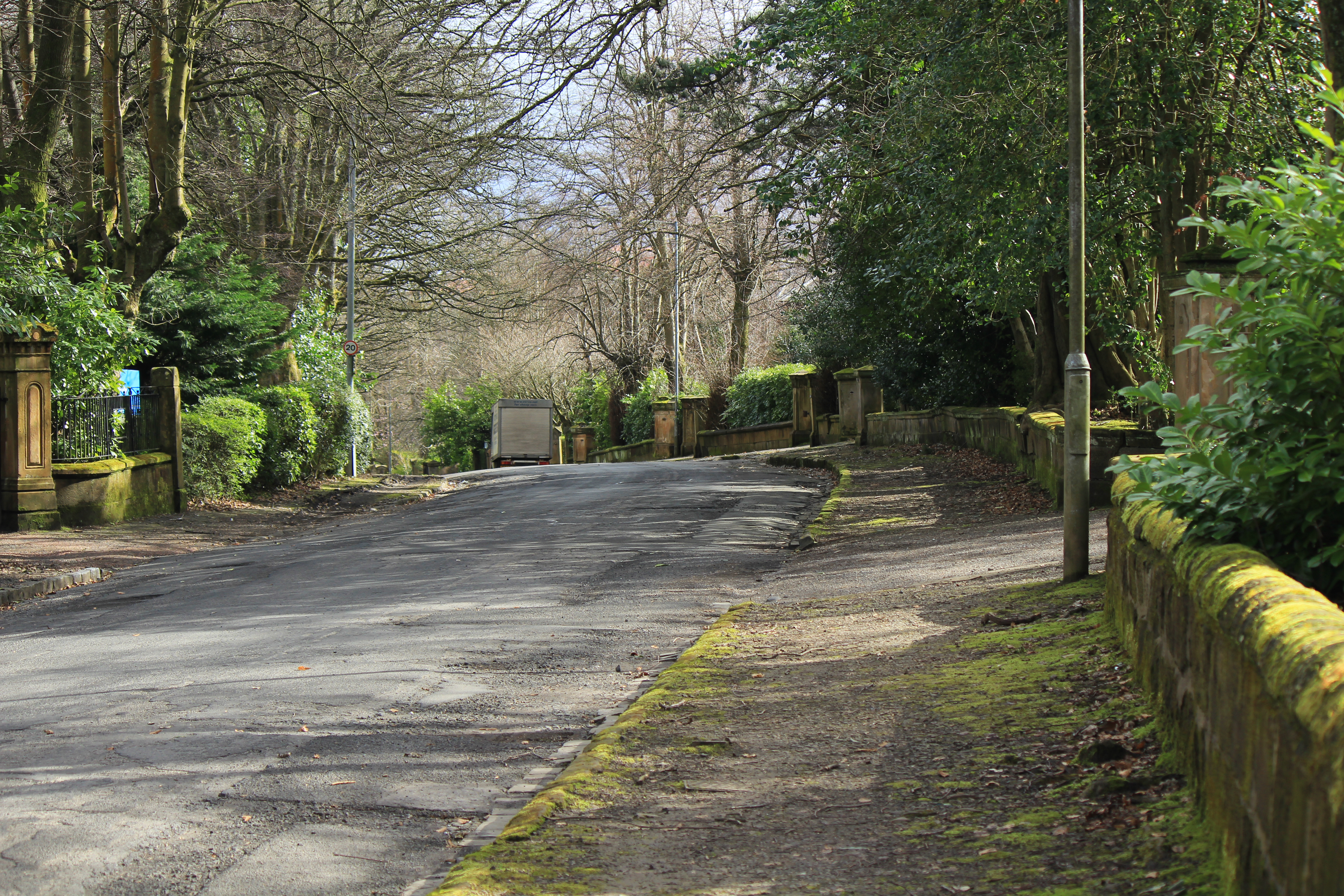
Main Road Castlehead

In the Middle Ages Castlehead made up part of Paisley Abbey's outfield lands, primarily used for raising crops. The land remained in ownership of the Abbey until the Maxwells (descended from the Maxwells of Caerlaverock) acquired the lands in the 17th century, and built upon them a manor house. This building was eventually to be replaced by 'The Old House' built in 1770 by James Maxwell.

Situated to the southwest of Paisley's teeming West End, the difficult terrain and the separation provided by the Paisley and Ardrossan Canal and later the Glasgow and South Western Railway kept Castlehead apart and undeveloped in the early 19th century. Its only buildings were a church and manse at the foot of the hill and the Old House.

Canal Street Church/West Relief Church, now Castlehead Church was built by Paisley weavers between 1781-82, and later refurbished in 1868. Among those buried in its churchyard were the poet Robert Tannahill and the maternal great-grandparents of U.S. President Ronald Reagan. The President visited the site during a brief trip to Scotland in 1991.

== Latter 19th century ==
In the 1850s, there was an unlikely coal mining enterprise on the lower slopes of the hill, roughly where Low Road stands today. James Young visited the site in 1856 to inspect the coal, however he decided that it was not of sufficient quality. The coal pit was short lived and bankrupted the family involved. To pay off the debt in part, the lands of Castlehead were sold by auction.

As Paisley developed rapidly, the overcrowding and unhygienic conditions of what became known as "the dirtiest town in Scotland" drove the merchant classes outwards and upwards. Social pressures overcame the problems of an unsuitable building site and "upward mobility" came to Paisley a hundred years before the phrase was coined.

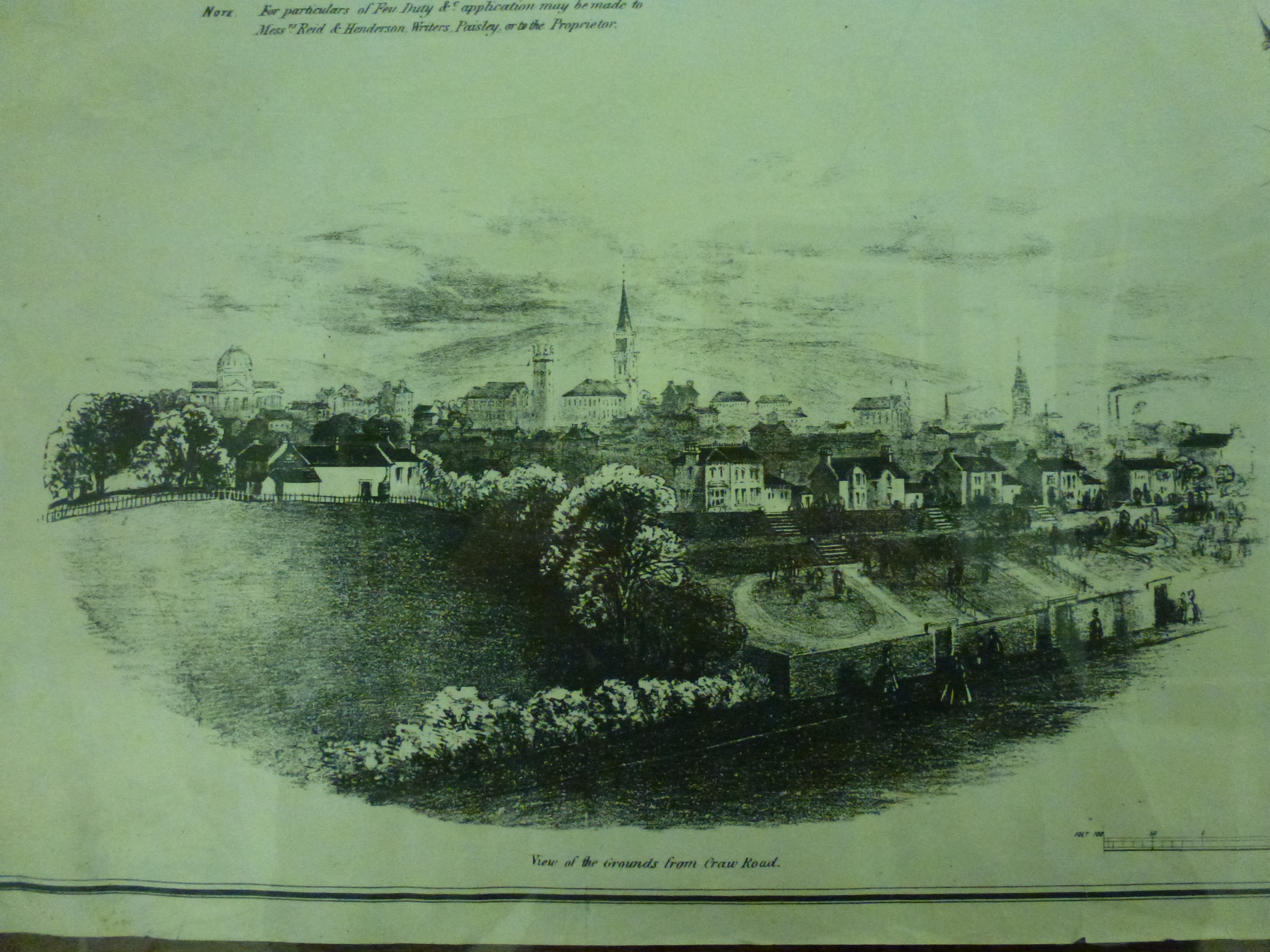
Castlehead, 1864 as seen from Craw Road, showing (from left to right) The Old House, Warriston, Rosemount, Medwyn, Greygables, Forneth. Paisley skyline in the background.

William Wotherspoon of Maxwellton, the feudal superior, began breaking the land into feus in 1861. By 1863, the Paisley Herald noted that another family residence had been erected in the area and that more were being considered. The writer saw this as excellent news for the local building trades and urged townspeople to visit this scarcely known vantage point to admire the splendid views -- "the town lying like a panoramic picture at your left and from all directions". He went on: "We would cordially recommend all who may find it convenient to do so to visit the ground, especially those who wish to erect a family residence".

Paisley Museum and Art Gallery has a map dated 1864 on which Wotherspoon and his agents, Reid and Henderson, writers, extol the virtues of their new venture. The map shows Castlehead with the housing plots marked and conforming fairly accurately to the layout that has survived to the twenty-first century. A note in the bottom right corner states "The ground is beautifully situated, commands the finest views around Paisley, has fine southern and western exposures, is within a seven-minute drive of the railway station, and the soil is of the richest nature".

A year later, the Paisley Herald reported that the area of Castlehead had been "tastefully mapped out into nearly 60 feus. Several villas in plain and ornate styles are being erected at prices varying from £1000 to £2000 and more are expected to follow."

== Prominent residents and buildings ==
By the time Castlehead was being established, most of the J. & P. Coats textiles family already had country estates far more imposing than anything the new Paisley development could offer. And while none of the new residents could match the Coats for wealth, they were among the wealthiest and most influential families in town and were not slow to put something back into the town that had made them prosperous.

Archibald Craig of Belmont, managing director of A F Craig, a major Paisley engineering company, owned the town's first Rolls-Royce (XS 6), and was the first of three Castlehead residents to give large sums towards the restoration of Paisley Abbey.

The magnificent building as we know it today only began to emerge from its Reformation ruins in the 1850s with the restoration of the nave and transepts. Then, in the 1890s, work began on restoring the cloisters. The financial backing for this came from Craig and it was his wife who laid the foundation stone. The work was completed in 1915, and by that time another Castlehead resident was financing an equally ambitious renewal project.

Robert Allison, of Rosemount (18 Main Road), started off in Love Street with a timber business. By the 1890s his company, Allison Cousland, had diversified into shipping, timber and insurance brokerage and had offices in St Vincent Street, Glasgow. He had no children and dispensed much of his considerable wealth on the fabric and welfare of Paisley. In 1912 he gave £8000, an enormous sum in those days, to the Abbey to complete the building of the tower from roof-level up. His gift is commemorated in stone above the tower door.

The work was postponed by the outbreak of war and when it resumed in 1922 inflation had produced a £6000 shortfall. Robert Allison stepped in again. Until his death in 1926 he also gave large sums to the ongoing clearance of the warren of slums around the Abbey and the reclamation of the grounds and graveyard.

Another important gift to the Abbey came from Castlehead when, in the 1950s, James W Begbie, of Southdene (36 Main Road) put up the money for the gates between the Abbey and St Mirin's Chapel.

Many years earlier, in 1891, Robert Allison had funded the building of Greenlaw Church's Arthur Allison Memorial Hall at Whitehaugh in memory of a brother. That project was a classic example of the Castlehead Mafia in action. He and a third brother, William, provided the timber, T.G. Abercrombie (Redholme, 5 Main Road)) was the architect, William Taylor was the stonemason and builder, John F Baird supplied the bricks and mortar, George G Kirk was the glass merchant. It is a fairly safe bet that at least one of Castlehead's army of solicitors, writers and notaries public handled the legal niceties.

The Russell Institute, the children's clinic at the corner of New Street and Causeyside, is another Castlehead legacy to the town. It was the gift of Miss Agnes Russell, of Muirfield, (32 Main Road) in memory of her brothers, Robert (also of Muirfield) and Thomas Russell, partners in the legal firm R & T Russell.

When she first came up with the scheme, Miss Russell went to her Castlehead neighbour, the architect T.G. Abercrombie. That was in 1923, but Abercrombie died in 1926 and the completed building is usually attributed to the man who had become his partner – J Steel Maitland. It seems unlikely that the prolific Abercrombie did not contribute at the planning stage of what is generally believed to be the first building in the West of Scotland with a reinforced concrete frame. The institute was opened by the Princess Royal in 1927.

Thomas Rowat of Warriston was already a very wealthy man by 1870 from his family's Thibet shawl and textile finishing company. By 1890, he was a major figure in Howard, Houlder and Malcolm, steamship and insurance brokers of 111 Union Street Glasgow and part of the Liverpool-based Houlder Line.

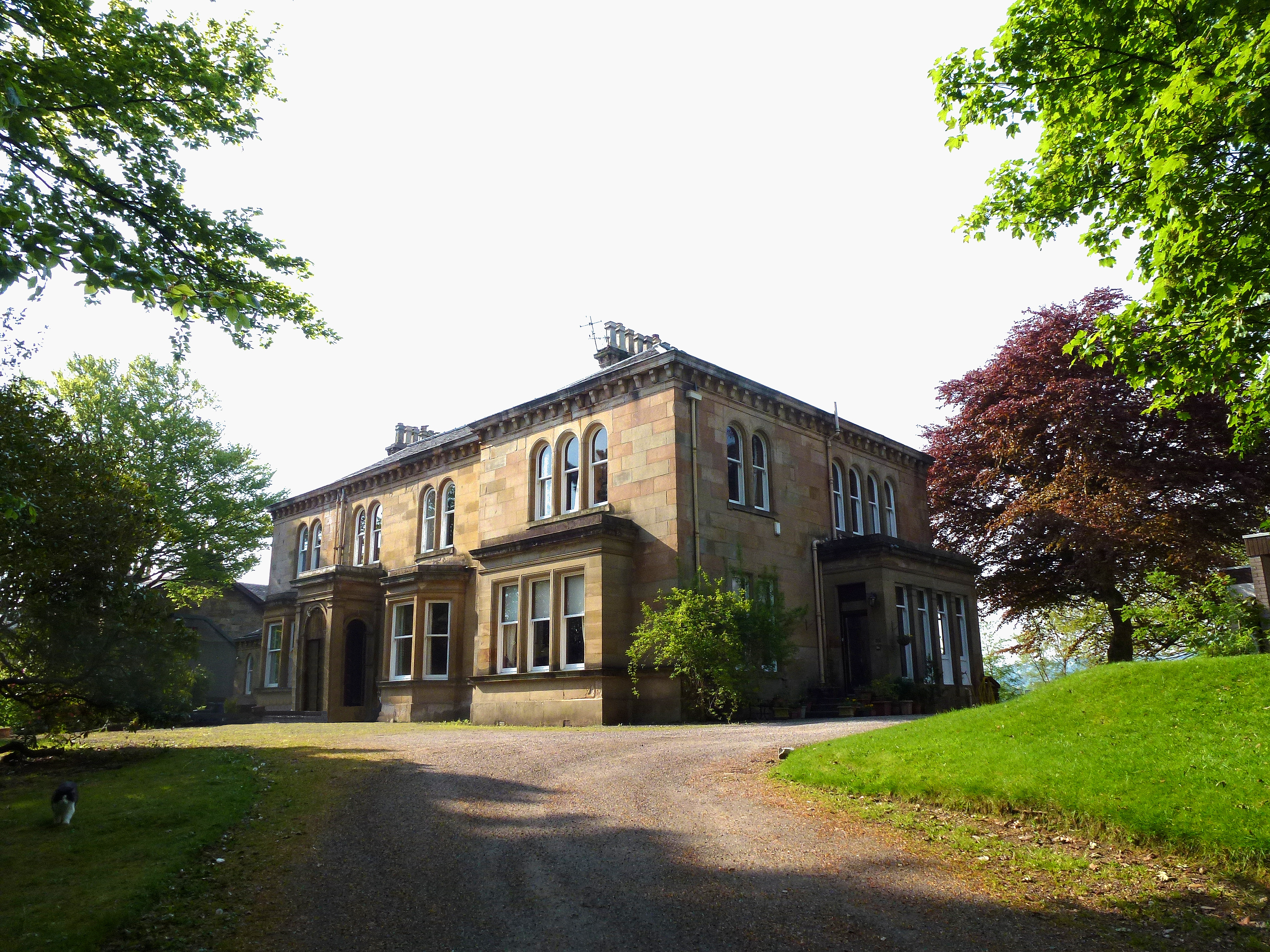
Warriston (16 Main Road) built c.1862, extended c.1885

Warriston (16 Main Road) was one of the biggest and most imposing residences in Castlehead, which was just as well, because Rowat had nine children. He had married Margaret Greenlees, of the textiles and shipping family, in 1856. Thirty years later both families were in Castlehead and Thomas and Margaret had produced an impressive brood, even by Victorian standards. There were four sons. Robert had his own shipping company, with offices in Wellington Street, Glasgow. This enterprise was eventually merged with the Greenlees interests. Thomas became a broker in London. Matthew became a tea planter in India and Claude a stockbroker in Glasgow. His company had become C.W Rowat and Millar by 1925.

Of the five Rowat daughters, three were married – Isa to Robert Wylie Hill of the Glasgow department store – but two, Mary and Lucy, did not marry and lived at Warriston until after the Second World War.

Castlehead continues to be the home of a number of prominent Paisley residents, including singer-songwriter Paolo Nutini and sculptor Alexander Stoddart.

Below is a table containing the number, name, date, first proprietor and their occupation for the houses of Main, High and Low Roads

Main Road

Number	Original Name	Date	Built for	Occupation
1	Mount Pleasant	c.1820s	Rev. Banks	Minister of Canal Street U.P. Church
3	Redholme	1889	Thomas Abercrombie	Architect, Abercrombie & Symington, 97 High Street
5	Potter's Field	c.1866	Robert Abercrombie	Abercrombie & Craig Engineers, 32 Lady Lane
7	Westlands	c.1866	Alexander Begg	Dalziel & Begg Shawl Manufacturers, 112 Causeyside
9	Belmont	c.1866	Hugh Cowan	Sheriff Substitute
10	Woodend	c.1864	William McIntyre	Wholesale Stationer, Works - blackhall, shop and warehouse - 6 High Street
11	Ashgrove	c.1866	Rev. Andrew Henderson	Minister of Abbey Close U.P. Church
12	The Mound	c.1870	Hugh Muir	Unknown
14	Castlehead House	1770	James Maxwell of Castlehead	Merchant and Landowner
-	Castlehead Cottage (Demolished)	1700s	James Maxwell of Castlehead	Merchant and Landowner
15	Ferndean	c.1866	Thomas Greenlees	Thomas Greenlees & Co. Manufacturer of Woollen Goods
16	Warriston	c.1862	Thomas W Macalpine	Drysalter, 48 Moss Street, Store – George Place
17	Bellevue	c.1866	Alexander Speirs	Speirs & Gibb Coal Merchants & Fireclay Manufactures, Stoney Brae/Underwood Depot
18	Rosemount	c.1861	Archibald Hodge	Accountant for J&P Coats
19	Priory Park	c.1874	John Young	John Young & Co. Timber Merchants, Burgh Saw Mills
20	Wallace Bank	c.1864	James McMurchy	Shawl Manufacturer
21	The Elms (Demolished 1938)	c.1880	William Gardner	Logan & Gardner Shawl Manufacturer
22	Bloomfield	c.1864	Robert F Dalziel	Dalziel & Begg Shawl Manufactures
23	Ecclestoun	c.1878	Rev. George Clazy	Minister of Reformed Presbyterian Church, 38 Oakshaw Street
24	Englethwaite	c.1864	Archibald Barr	Yarn Merchant
25	Auchinean	c.1872	William Murray	David Murray & Son, House Painters and Decorators
26	Netherton	c.1871	Thomas Greenlees	Thomas Greenlees & Co.
28	Langholm	c.1872	James Murray	Manufacturer, Causeyside Street
29	South Manse	c.1878	Rev. C McDonald	Minister of South Church
30	Moredun House	c.1873	John Armour Brown	Brown & Polson, Corn Flour & Starch Manufacturers
31	Mossgiel		E Murray	
32	Balgonie	c.1875	George McKenzie	Photographer, 5 Gilmour Street/Willowbrae, Piershill, Edinburgh
33	Fairholme	c.1882	W.B. McLennan	Campbell & McLennan, Shawl Manufacturers
34	Knockbrecken	c.1875	Robert Millar	J&R Millar, Manufacturers
35	The Laurels	c.1884	Joseph Lochhead	McInnes, McKenzie & Lochhead, Writers, 7 Gilmour Street
36	Southdene	c.1875	John Millar	J&R Millar, Manufacturers
37	The Cottage		George Watt	Wine & Spirit Merchant
38	Dunscore	c.1876	John K Crawford	M. Whitehill & Co. Shawl Manufactures
40	Dunrod	c.1878	John Stirling	Wine & Spirit Merchant

High Road

Number	Original Name	Date	Built for	Occupation
2	Ellangowan	c.1866	David Murray	Provost and Collector of Inland Revenue
4	Newton Bank	c.1866	James McKean	Wine & Spirit Merchant, 63 Causeyside
6	Double Villa	c.1872	James Parlane	J&R Parlane, Printers, Bookbinders, 97 High Street, Works – School Wynd
8	Tullieallan	c.1875	David Wilson	M. Whitehill & Co. Shawl Manufactures
9	Edgehill	c.1868	Mrs Eliza Glen	No occupation
10	Morven	c.1873	Andrew D Gibb	Speirs & Gibb Coal Merchants & Fireclay Manufactures, Stoney Brae/Underwood Depot
12	St. James Manse	c.1874	Rev. James Brown	Minister of St. James Street U.P. Church

Low Road

Number	Original Name	Date	Built for	Occupation
1	Edgemont	c.1872	George Dobie	Tobacco and Candle Manufacturer, Orchard Street
2	Braefoot	c.1867	John Greenlees	Matthew Greenlees & Son, 7-8 Forbes Place
3	Ravenswood	c.1871	John K Crawford	M. Whitehill & Co. Shawl Manufactures
4	The Willows	c.1867	Thomas MacRobert	Writer & JP Clerk-depute, County Place (MacRoberts Solicitors)
5	Marion Grove	c.1868	James Parlane	Draper & Silk Mercer, 10 High Street
6	Hayfield	c.1867	Allan Coats	W&A Coats, Ham Curers and Grocers, 68 Broomlands
7	Marion Grove (Extended)	c.1870s	John Parlane	Draper & Silk Mercer, 10 High Street
8	Firgrove	c.1873	James Thomson	
9	Gowanlea	c.1868	Robert A Gardner	Secretary of Life Insurance Co.
10	Norwell	c.1873	John Brown	
11	Annfield Villa	c.1868	Mrs J Muir	Accountants, 23 Moss Street/Draper & Silk Mercer, 96 High Street
12	U.F.C. Manse			
13	Rockbank	c.1866	William Robertson	Robertson & McGibbon, Drapers & Silk Mercers, 17 High Street
14	Hazelwood			
15	Nether Villa	c.1866	Alexander Mackintosh	Joiner & Packing Box Maker, 12 Newton Street
16	Glenfield Cottage	c.1868	William Brownlie	Manager of Glenfield Starch Works
17	Glencairn	c.1869	Alexander Cairns	A&R Cairns, Wholesale Confectioners - 2 High Street, works - 32 High Street

== Shipping and shipbuilding ==
Castlehead in its heyday had several major players in the shipping industry. If that seems surprising today, bear in mind that until two thirds of the way through the twentieth century the Clyde was one of the world's busiest ports. Every shipping line worthy of the name had offices in Glasgow and there were scores of ship managers and brokers to handle the business of the smaller fry. It was a lucrative business, and Castlehead's moguls did not miss the opportunity.

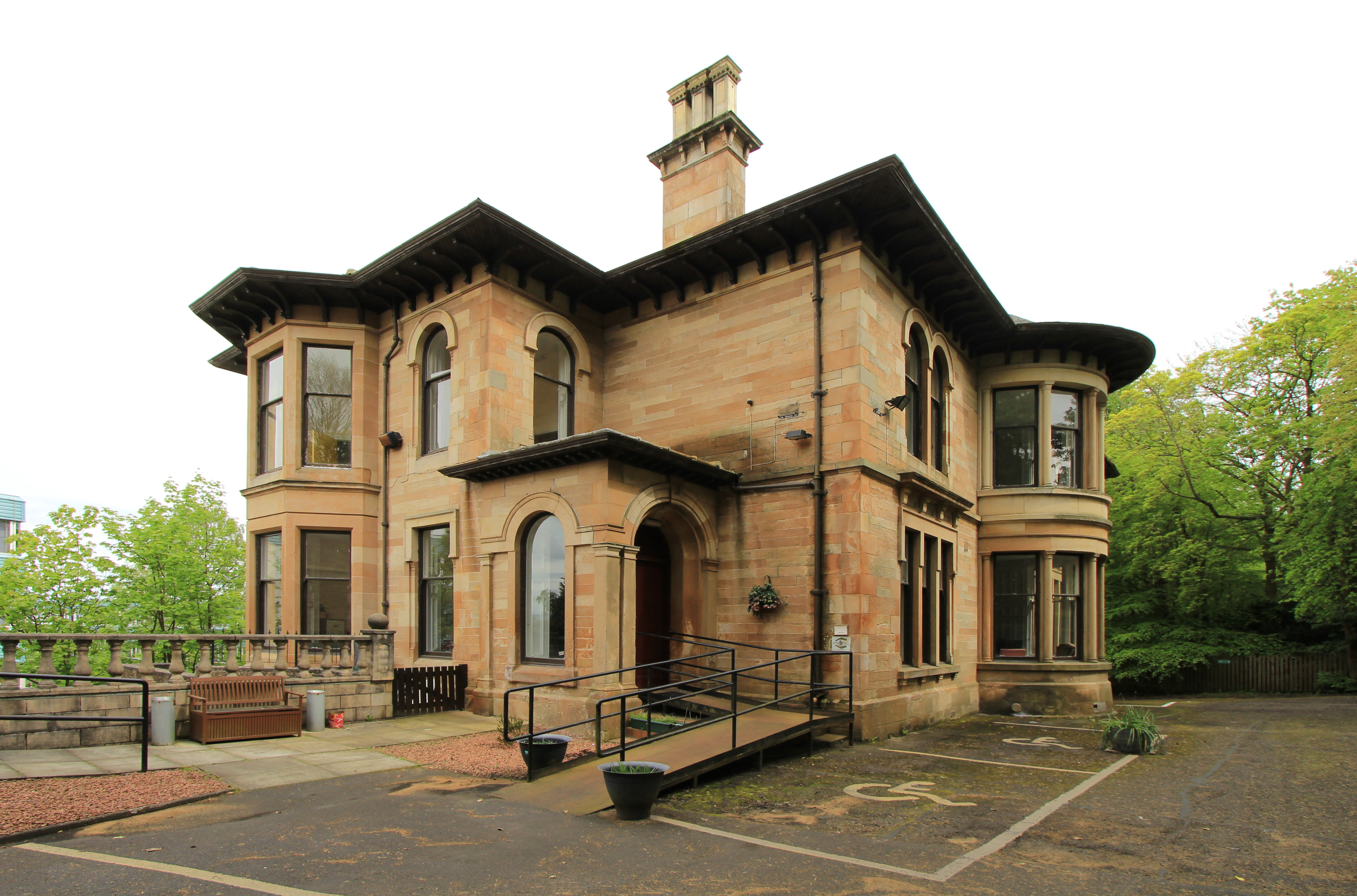
Priory Park, Castlehead. Built in 1874 for John Young - a wealthy timber merchant and Bailie of the Town Council. Later the home of William Bow, of Bow, McLachlan and Company. He was also a Justice of the Peace for the County.

The Greenlees at Netherton (26 Main Road) were related to the J. & P. Coats dynasty and their own family fortune was based on Rule and Greenlees, large-scale manufacturers of cotton and gingham clothing in the East End of Glasgow. It was a natural progression for major importers of textiles from the Far East to run their own ships and they set up the Netherton Shipping Company.

By 1900, Robert Allison had expanded from timber brokerage to timber importing and ship brokerage. His nephew, Arthur, followed him into shipping and by the early 1900s was a partner in Allison, Fullarton Shipping, of 90 Mitchell Street, Glasgow.

Castlehead even had its own shipbuilder, William Bow, of Bow, McLachlan and Company, one of five Paisley shipbuilders in the early twentieth century. His Abbotsinch yard specialised in tugs and was one of the pioneers of "kit boats", pre-fabricated in the upriver yard and reassembled as and where required. The yard closed in 1932 but was re-opened during the Second World War by P. W. MacLellan to fabricate landing craft for the D-Day invasion.

Bow was an enthusiastic supporter of day-release schemes under which his apprentices attended courses at Paisley Technical College (now the University of the West of Scotland). In 1928 he gave his house, Dunscore, to the college for use as a residence for the Principal, and moved along Main Road to Priory Park.

== Clyde Valley Regional Plan ==
After the Second World War, during which the Luftwaffe scored one direct hit and a score of near misses, Castlehead faced a new threat from a study group set up by the Scottish Office.

The co-authors of The Clyde Valley Regional Plan (1946) were Sir Patrick Abercrombie and Robert H Matthew, and they began work on their blueprint for the future in 1944. To understand their perspective, it has to be remembered that the jet engine was still a secret weapon at the time and foreign travel something that required a troopship.

The report includes a detailed and precise account of Paisley's history, industrial prosperity and culture. It charts the rapid nineteenth century expansion of the town and an equally rapid decline towards overcrowded slums. Population density was greater than even Glasgow's. This was a problem that post-war Scotland would have to address urgently, but Abercrombie and Matthew believed that expansion should not encroach too far onto the farmland to the south and southwest. This was an invaluable national asset, as five years of food rationing had demonstrated.

Castlehead, together with the adjacent Craw Road, Riccartsbar Avenue, and most of the residences spread out to Brodie Park and Corsebar Drive, provided their escape from a dilemma. Here was an area of extremely low-density housing close to the town centre. Better still, wartime shortages of materials and tradesmen had left it unkempt and neglected. There were no gardeners for hire. Able-bodied husbands and sons were in the Forces and so were house painters, builders and slaters.

Stating glibly that "the report does not set out to make detailed proposals for individual towns", the authors then included an artist's impression of Paisley as they would like to see it. Described as "a bird’s eye view", and in full colour, it shows that Castlehead, Craw Road, High Calside and the rest have gone – replaced by high-density skyscrapers. There were 16 storeys to the concrete tower blocks they envisaged for the south side of Main Road from Woodend to Calside and they were hardly any smaller on the other side.

And so on it went – another vast plantation of concrete and roughcast replaced Craw Road and Riccarstbar Avenue, and there was yet another on what appears to be the present site of the Royal Alexandra Hospital.

The Ferguslie cricket ground was to be preserved, and so, it seemed, was the old Canal Street with its ribbon of tumbledown tenements and what looked like an impossibly busy Canal Street station and its attendant coal yards and sidings.

Castlehead householders, having survived Adolf Hitler’s bombs, feared that they were about to be evicted for some derisory compulsory purchase settlement. For some there would have been no alternative to becoming council tenants on this dystopian new housing estate. The protests were vociferous, but the council seemed unconcerned. The reason soon became clear: apart from following the Town and Country Planning directives on short-term permission for garden sheds and garages, Paisley ignored Abercrombie.

The Clyde Valley Regional Plan played its part in shaping post-war Scotland. It proposed the new towns of East Kilbride and Cumbernauld, the Glasgow overspill strategy and had a host of plans for regenerating industry, transport, and agriculture. But in this and much else it failed to realise how much the world was going to change.

Abercrombie and Matthew’s priorities included an improved rail service to Gourock and Wemyss Bay to handle the hordes they envisaged taking holidays on the Costa Clyde, as it was later (and ironically) dubbed. They wanted to preserve farmland at all costs so that the nation’s food supplies would never again be threatened, but they enthusiastically recommended dotting the region with little wooden huts, their so-called "holiday shacks" where dutiful citizens would spend rural holidays and long weekends. The Balloch end of Loch Lomond would be a National Recreation Centre, with sail boats, canoes and hotel complexes as ugly as any in today's package holiday destinations. There was also to be a holiday town of dachas at Roseneath.

Having opted against encroachment on the indifferent agricultural land at the foot of the Gleniffer Braes, the report proposed a major iron-ore terminal opposite Dumbarton Rock and an iron and steel plant on the rich farmland between Bishopton and Erskine. Bishopton would become a full-blown New Town and so would Houston. The report did not, however, contemplate anything as far-fetched as a New Town at Erskine.

By 1947 the Burgh Engineer, John McGregor, a Castlehead resident, had outlined plans of his own for a new Paisley pattern. Canal Street and George Street would be redeveloped and the overspill from the overcrowded homes there and elsewhere in the town centre re-housed in new garden suburbs to the south and west—Glenburn and Foxbar. There were many pitfalls and many objections before McGregor's dream became a reality in the 1950s. But Abercrombie's eccentric vision was receding. Castlehead and common sense had prevailed.

And, of course, Castlehead began to pick itself up again. Gardeners and housemaids were becoming politically incorrect as well as expensive, but tradesmen were back from the war and the area began to look better. The Burgh Engineer who followed McGregor, Val McNaughton, saw the area's best hope of further revival in dividing houses into more manageable units and building on dead land between some of the bigger houses. All this began to happen in the late 1950s and within 20 years McNaughton was singing the praises of Castlehead when it was designated a conservation area of architectural and historic merit.

== See also ==
- Clyde Valley
- Mill town
- Paisley
- University of the West of Scotland
- Victorian Era
