= David Semple (antiquarian) =

Scottish lawyer and antiquary

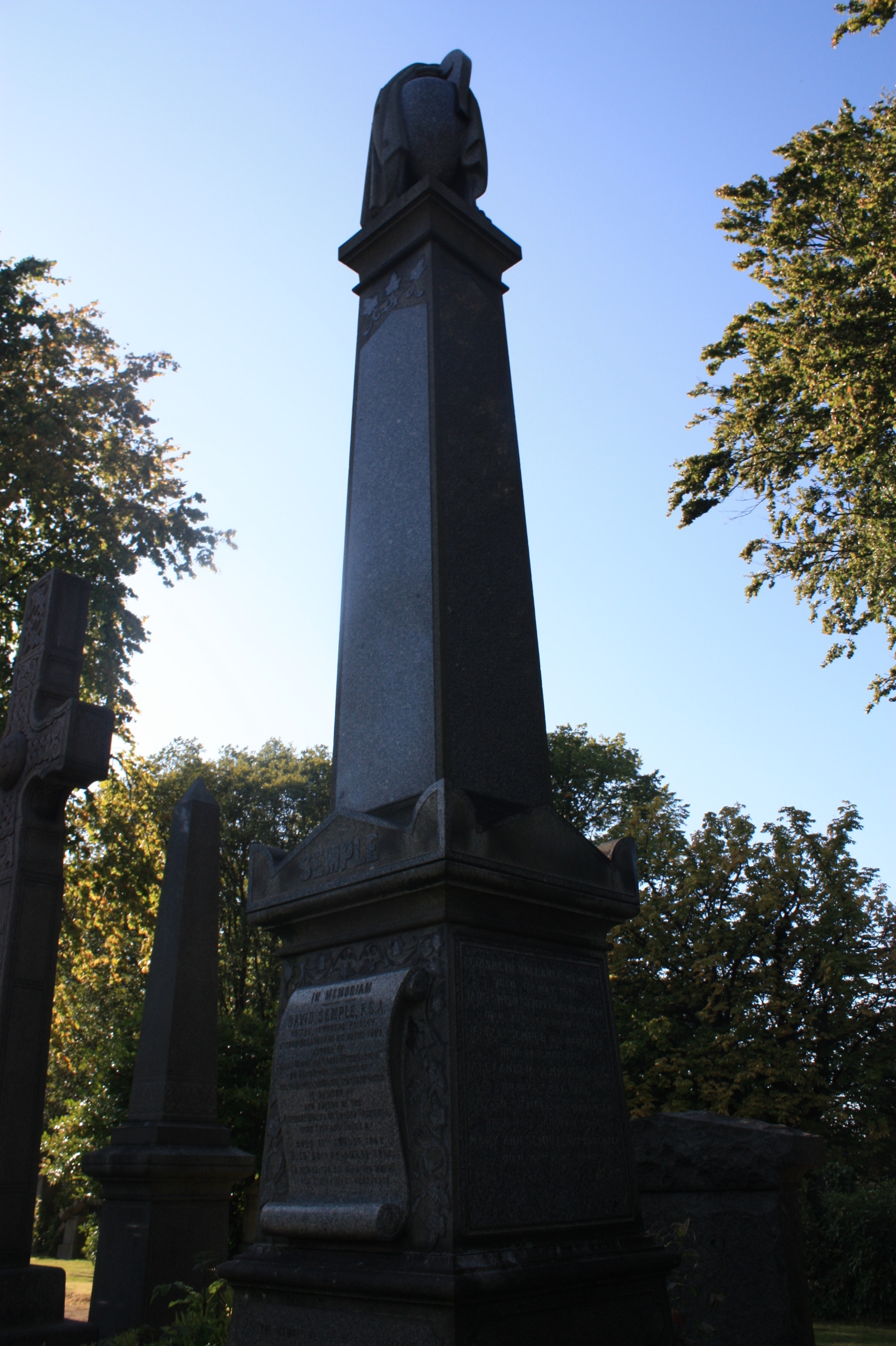
The grave of David Semple, Woodside Cemetery, Paisley

David Semple FSA (1808–1878) was a Scottish lawyer and antiquary.

== Life ==
Semple was born at Townhead, Paisley, on 21 August 1808. Educated at Paisley Grammar School and trained in a lawyer's office, he went into business on his own account in Paisley, and made a reputation as a conveyancer.

Semple for long acted as the agent for the liberals of the burgh. In 1873 he was elected a fellow of the Society of Antiquaries of Scotland. He died at Paisley on 23 Dec. 1878.

He is buried in Woodside Cemetery, Paisley, towards the west end of the main east-west path at the crest of the hill.

== Works ==
Semple's works mainly dealt with local history. They were:

- Poll-tax Rolls of Renfrewshire of 1695, published in 1862.
- The Lairds of Glen and History of the Cross Steeple, 1868.
- Saint Mirin, with two supplements, a treatise on the patron saint of Paisley, 1872.
- Barons and Barony of Renfrewshire, 1876.
- The Tree of Crockston, 1876.
- Abbey Bridge of Paisley, 1878.

He also prepared a complete edition of Robert Tannahill's Poems, with a memoir and notes (Glasgow, 1870).

== Notes ==
Attribution

This article incorporates text from a publication now in the public domain: Lee, Sidney, ed. (1897). "Semple, David". Dictionary of National Biography. Vol. 51. London: Smith, Elder & Co.
