= Peter Burnet (weaver) =

Peter Burnet (or Black Peter) (1764 – 2 August 1847) was a freeborn African American man who emigrated to Paisley, where he lived for over sixty years and worked as a weaver. He is thought to be the first African American to live in Paisley and was a close friend of the poet Robert Tannahill.

== Early life and emigration ==
Burnet was born free in 1764 on the estate of Thomas Todd in Virginia. His grandfather worked in a prestigious job for an African prince before he was brought to the United States due to Atlantic slave trade.

His mother died when he was very young, but because she was not a slave, Burnet was considered a free man. He still however, had limited rights due to his race.

At twelve years old Burnet left home and worked as a cabin boy on the British vessel the Fencastle in Chesapeake Bay. When the vessel docked in New York City, he worked for various wealthy individuals, including William Torrance, a merchant whom he agreed to accompany back to his hometown of Glasgow.

== Life in Scotland ==
Burnet moved to Kilmarnock and intended to learn to be a millwright from George Tannahill, he instead decided to become a weaver as it would be more profitable. He was then introduced to George's cousin a Paisley weaver named James Tannahill in 1780. James Tannahill was Robert Tannahill's father, and this began a lifelong friendship between Peter and Robert. Burnett learned weaving from John Boag.

As the weaving industry was lucrative, Burnet was known to dress in expensive fashionable clothes and enjoy dancing and socialising. He briefly lived in Edinburgh for two years as a livery servant during an economic downturn, before returning to Paisley.

Burnett lived in Scotland for more than 60 years. John Campbell, a poet from Paisley wrote a poem about Peter Burnett

"To tell all Peter’s rigs and loves would take a whole night’s chatter, For after this he married twice, ’twas all for love, no matter; And now, alas! for Peter, he’s grown old and poor also, But he’s still a fine old fellow, as ever you saw go."

== Friendship with Robert Tannahill ==
Burnet was a close friend of Robert Tannahill and worked with each other as weavers. He was said to entertain Robert and his brothers with stories of his time in America. It is speculated that Tannahill's friendship with Burnet may have influenced Tannahill's involvement with the abolitionist movement. Primarily his poem "Lines, Written on reading Campbell's ‘Pleasures of Hope’" and his song "The Negro Girl".

When Robert Tannahill committed suicide in 1810, Peter Burnet dived into the culvert of the Maxwellton Burn to recover his body.

After Robert's death, the Tannahill family continued to support Burnet. When he was imprisoned after being accused of owing his landlord money, the family provided him with food and a bed. He was later released after taking a vow of poverty.

== Marriage and family ==
His first marriage was to Peggy Boag, the daughter of John Boag. Peggy and his first child both died during childbirth. He then married a woman from Glasgow who he fathered three children with, she then died of tuberculosis. His third wife died of an unspecified sickness. Burnet outlived two of his four children.

== Death ==
Burnet died on 1 August 1847, aged 83, and is buried in the Castlehead Church graveyard near the Tannahill family.

== Legacy ==
His biography was written by John Parkhill in 1841 and sold for three pence.

In 2023 a historical tour in Paisley took place which focused on the life of Peter Burnet for black history month.
