= Robert Tannahill =

Scottish poet

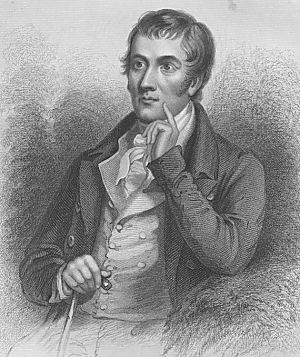
Engraving from the Biographical dictionary of eminent Scotsmen (1875)

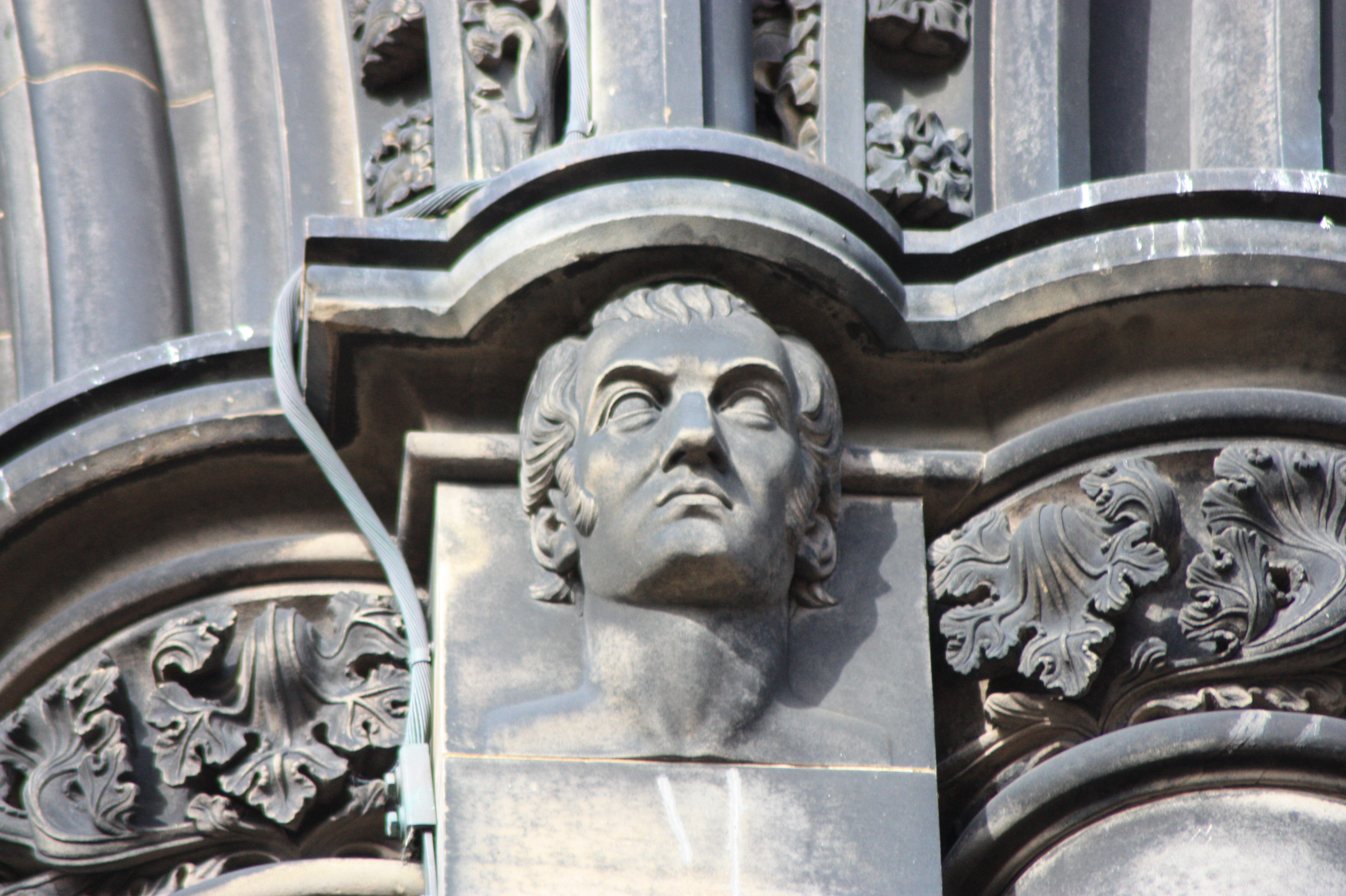
Robert Tannahill as appearing on the Scott Monument

Robert Tannahill (3 June 1774 – 17 May 1810) was a Scottish poet of labouring class origin. Known as the 'Weaver Poet', he wrote poetry in English and lyrics in Scots in the wake of Robert Burns.

== Life ==
Tannahill was born in Castle Street in Paisley to Janet (née Pollock) and James Tannahill, a silk gauze weaver. Soon after his birth the family moved to a newly built cottage in nearby Queen Street, which became both family home and weaving shop. Tannahill had a delicate constitution and a limp, due to a slight deformity in his right leg. On leaving school at age 12, he was apprenticed to his father as a handloom weaver. It was during this time that he began to show an interest in poetry.

With his apprenticeship completed, Tannahill left Paisley in late 1779 to work in Bolton, Lancashire. He returned in late 1801 to support his family. His father died soon after his return and he cared for his infirm mother. As he reported in a letter to a friend, "My brother Hugh and I are all that remain at home, with our old mother, bending under age and frailty; and but seven years back, nine of us used to sit down at dinner together." Then Hugh married and Robert was left the sole support, making a resolution which he records in a touching but substandard poem in English, "The Filial Vow". As things fell out, however, his mother was to outlive him by thirteen years.

In the years which followed, his interest in poetry and music blossomed after he became acquainted with the composer Robert Archibald Smith, who set some of his songs in the Scots language to music. While taking part in the literary life of the town, he helped found the Paisley Burns Club and became its secretary. His work now began to appear in periodicals such as The Scots Magazine and in 1807 he published a small collection of poems and songs in an edition of 900 copies which sold out in a few weeks. Out on a walk some time later, he heard a girl in a field singing his "We'll meet beside the dusky glen on yon burnside" and was greatly encouraged. But in 1810, following the rejection of an augmented collection of his work by publishers in Greenock and Edinburgh, he fell into a despondency aggravated by fears for his own health. Eventually he burned all his manuscripts and apparently drowned himself in a culverted stream under the Paisley Canal, where he was found by his close friend Peter Burnet, because he had left his jacket and watch at the mouth of the tunnel.

However, in 2024 research conducted by Paisley Museum and Dr Moira Hansen from the Open University cast doubt on the belief that he deliberately took his own life. According to the researchers, Tannahill was suffering from tuberculosis and was experiencing "episodes of incoherent delirium". He entered the stream in a confused state, in an attempt to cool himself in the water. This explains why he took the time to remove his coat and watch, and why he hadn’t headed for the deeper waters nearby. The researchers concluded that his death was accidental rather than suicide.

== Poetry ==
Most of Tannahill's poetry dates from his return home in 1802, when he composed as he worked at the loom, ‘weaving threads and verses alternately’. His interest in poetry was of long standing and his reading was almost solely confined to it. Using both Scots and English, he experimented with many forms: tales, fables, epitaphs, verse epistles, odes, besides the body of dialect song on which his reputation mainly rests. Among the odes are three written for the Burns anniversary, of which the first is a bravura performance. Here the tartan-clad Genius of Scotland enters the assembly of the gods on Olympus and begs for a national bard, which is immediately granted with the birth of Burns. Poverty is a frequent theme in his work, including that brought about by the Napoleonic Wars for returning soldiers and sailors or their widows.

The 1807 collection had been titled The soldier's return, a Scottish interlude in two acts, with other poems and songs. The title piece was a dramatic fragment in dialect couplets, serving as frame for accompanying lyrics, of which Tannahill (but few others) thought highly. The book had been published by subscription, as was common at the time, but the poet later objected to this as demeaning. It was for this reason that he made unsuccessful attempts to get his work accepted commercially. But it was not long after his death that such editions began to come from the press: in 1815 and 1817, with a reprint of the original collection in 1822. In addition, there was a large selection in Motherwell's Harp of Renfrewshire, dating from 1819 and several times reprinted. Later collections of Tannahill's work, augmented by copies of poems preserved by his friends and associates, followed soon after.

== Music ==
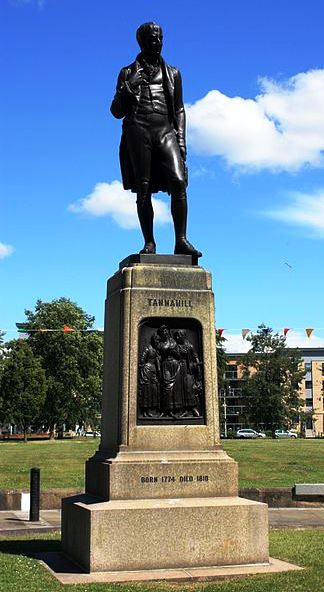
The statue of the poet by David Watson Stevenson

As well as R.A.Smith's settings, other songs were set by John Ross, the Aberdeen organist. More had been written by Tannahill to accompany traditional Scottish airs, and some from Ireland too. Several have now entered the oral tradition. Perhaps the most enduring is "The Braes of Balquhidder" – the basis for the ballad "Wild Mountain Thyme", which has the chorus "Will Ye Go Lassie, Go?" In it he refers to a story from his nursemaid, Mary McIntyre of Balquhither parish, that she and her mother had baked bannock for the army of Charles Edward Stuart, marching to Culloden. Tannahill also wrote "Thou Bonnie Wood of Craigielea", the tune of which was later modified to form the music for the famous Australian bush folk song "Waltzing Matilda". Finally, Tannahill wrote "The Soldier's Adieu", which became the basis for the folk song "Farewell to Nova Scotia".

In 2006 Brechin All Records released Volume 1 of The Complete Songs of Robert Tannahill. Volume 2 was released in 2010 to coincide with the second centenary of his death.

== Legacy ==
As a suicide, Tannahill was buried in an unmarked grave in the burying ground adjacent to the West Relief Church (now Castlehead Cemetery) on Canal Street in Paisley. In 1866 a granite monument was erected there by public subscription, marking the growing recognition of the poet's importance. The centenary of his birth was marked in 1874 by an edition of his Poems and Songs and by a procession to the Gleniffer Braes, one of the most frequently mentioned landscapes in his work, attended by 15,000 people. A series of annual concerts at which his songs were performed were held on the Braes between 1876 - 1936. The penny admission charge went towards paying for David Watson Stevenson's statue of Tannahill that was erected in the grounds of Paisley Abbey in 1883. A memorial well was also built in the glen, although now it is much neglected.

Likenesses of the poet all seem to have stemmed from a pencil sketch made the day after his death by local artist John Morton. The first copperplate engraving of this appeared as the frontispiece of The Harp of Renfrewshire in 1819 and later accompanied editions of the poems in 1822, 1825, 1838, and 1846. Later came bust-size portraits in oil, of which one was made in 1833 by William Beith, a Paisley flower painter. Another by Thomas Carswell, a Greenock artist, was made for Mr. Marshall of Ladyburn, who had been at school with Tannahill. This was partly done from the engraved portrait in the Harp of Renfrewshire and checked against Marshall's remembrance of his old school-fellow. Still another by Alexander Blair was engraved by Samuel Freeman for the Biographical dictionary of eminent Scotsmen (see above).

A bust of the poet was sculpted by John Fillans in 1845, again using Morton's drawing as a basis, and this was presented to Paisley Museum in 1873. Elsewhere, a bust of the poet was included in the Wallace Monument’s Hall of Heroes in 1869. And in 1889 his portrait appeared among others in the stained glass windows at Lamlash House commissioned from Stephen Adam.

Tannahill is one of the sixteen writers and poets depicted on the lower sections of the Scott Monument on Princes Street in Edinburgh. He appears on the right side of the southern face.

After a period of intermission, the Burns Club he helped found now meets during the winter months in the old Tannahill cottage.

The Scottish folk music group the Tannahill Weavers, active since 1976, are named after Robert Tannahill, and have recorded several of his songs.

== See also ==
- Scottish literature
- "Famous Scots Series". A biography of Tannahill appears in the book, James Hogg by Sir George Douglas.
