= Gleniffer Braes =

Hills and park in Scotland

Coordinates: 55°48′48″N 4°29′0″W

Gleniffer Braes ("brae" being the Scots language word for the slope or brow of a hill) is a short range of hills and parkland to the south of Paisley, Scotland, which form the boundary of Renfrewshire and North Ayrshire.

== Area ==
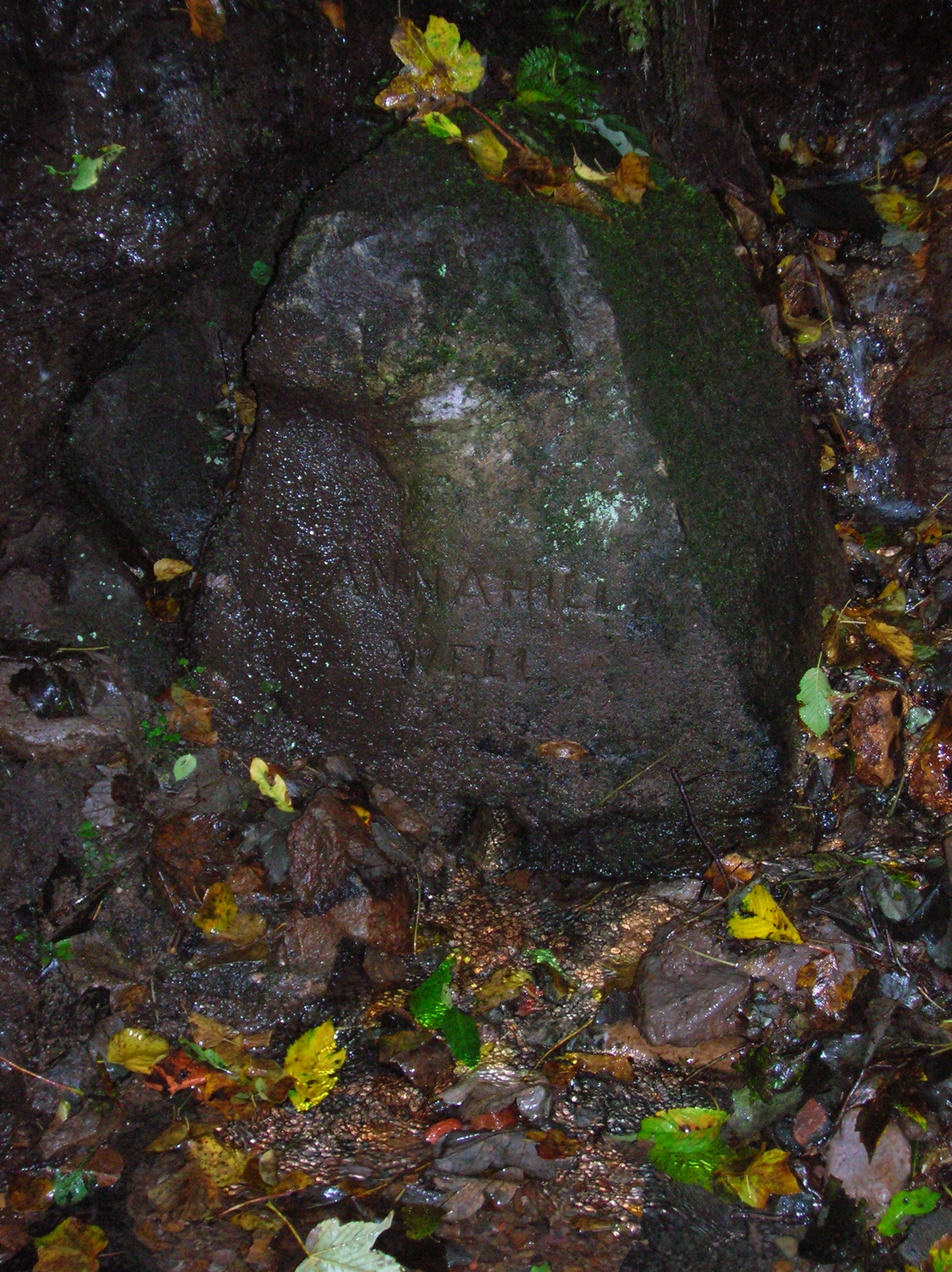
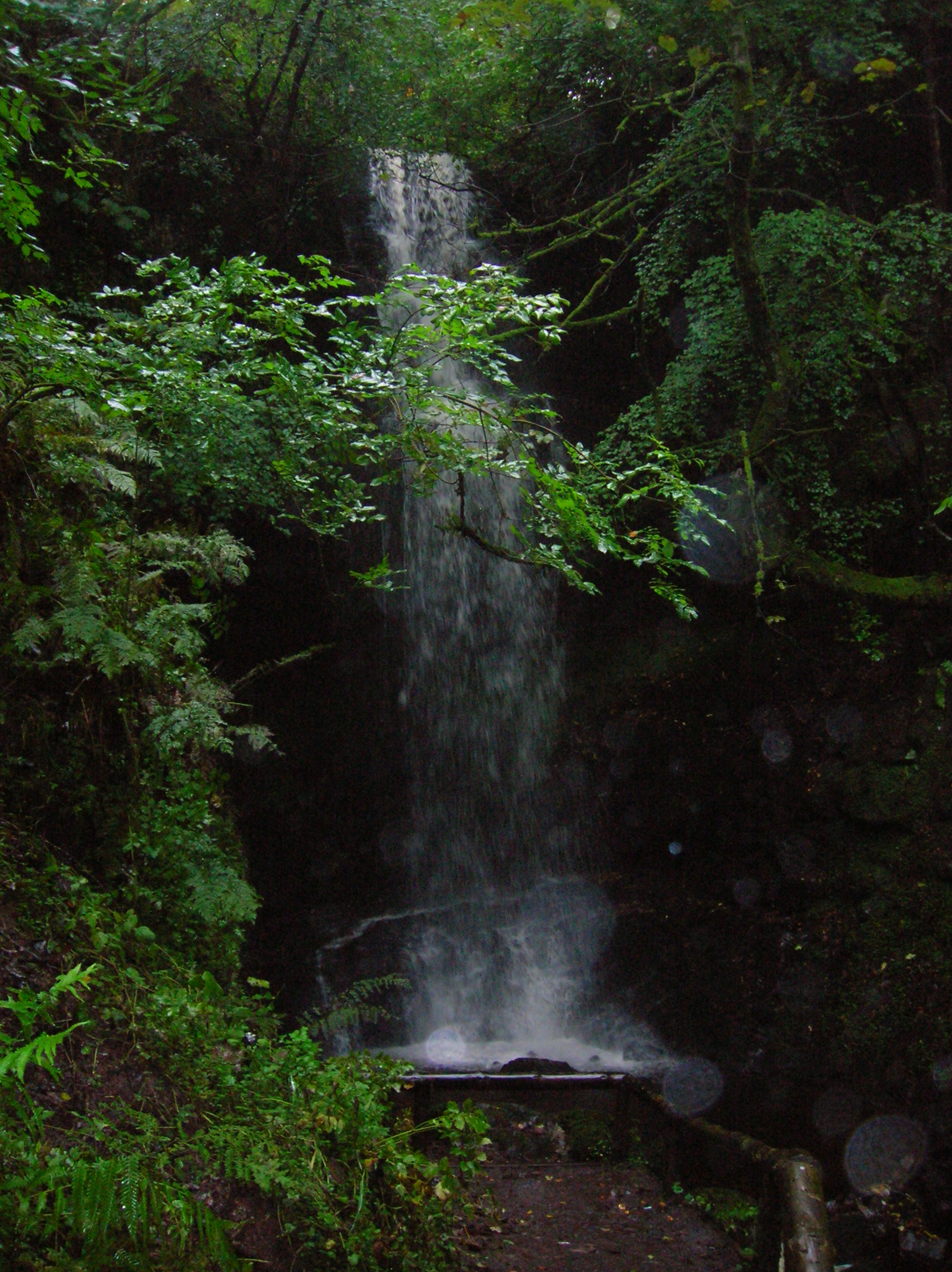
(Left) Tannahill's well (Right) Craigielinn waterfall

In the braes, is found the Robertson Country Park. The park is an upland area covering approximately 480 acres. It is mainly moorland but there is some woodland areas and hill farming areas. There is also woodland walk paths, streams and waterfalls, picnic areas, birdwatching sites and play equipment for children. Views of Paisley and the lower Clyde Valley to Ben Lomond are offered from the park, including from Robertson car park. The area is situated on the edge of the Clyde plateau lavas; a feature is Gleniffer gorge situated along the Tannahill walkway. It reaches approximately 50 feet deep in places and is eroded by the Gleniffer burn. Another feature is the Craigielinn waterfall in Glen park, where icicles are sometimes seen hanging in winter.

== Wildlife ==
Cattle are used to control the vegetation and retain the wide open spaces within the park area. Birds that can be seen in the area include, skylarks, sparrowhawks, kestrels, goldcrests and chaffinches. Other animals include roe deer, woodmice, voles and tawny owls can be seen at night.

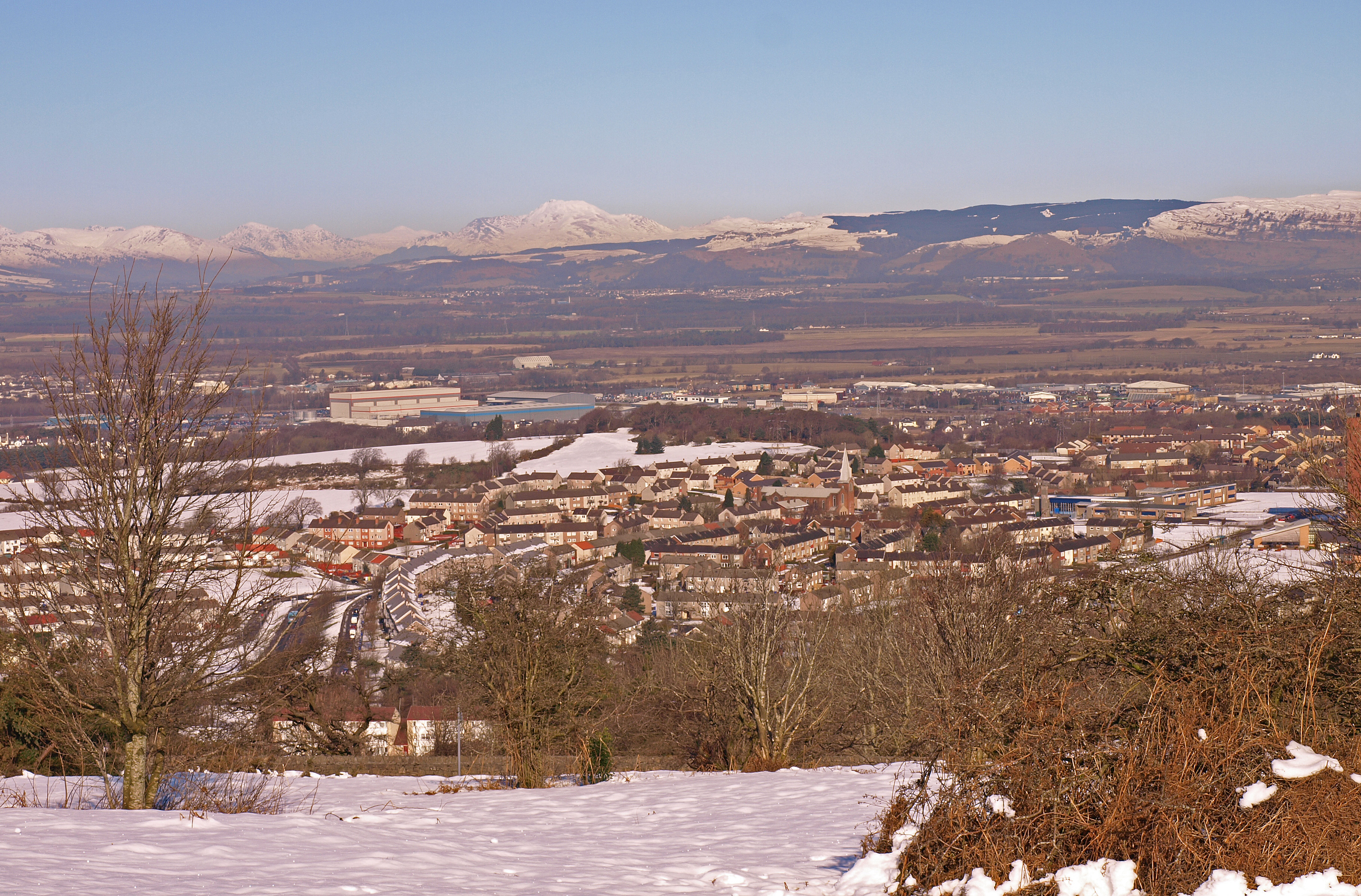
View from the car park in the sky

== History ==
The park has associations with the 18th and 19th century weaver poets of Paisley. Robert Tannahill (1774-1810) and Hugh Macdonald (1817-1860) are commemorated by the Tannahill walkway and the Tannahill well, Macdonald's walks and the Bonnie wee well. The Lapwing lodge outdoor centre (formerly Peesweep) is situated on the braes. It was originally a sanatorium for Coats Mill workers and was built in 1910. The Red Cross and the Scouts used it for camping. It is now owned by the West Region Scout Council. There was also a pub called the Peesweep Inn. It was converted to a private house in 1925, since demolished. A major electrical substation is also here. It was expanded in 2005 and covers the site of the former WWII decoy ponds as well as a radio transmitter.

== Standing stones ==
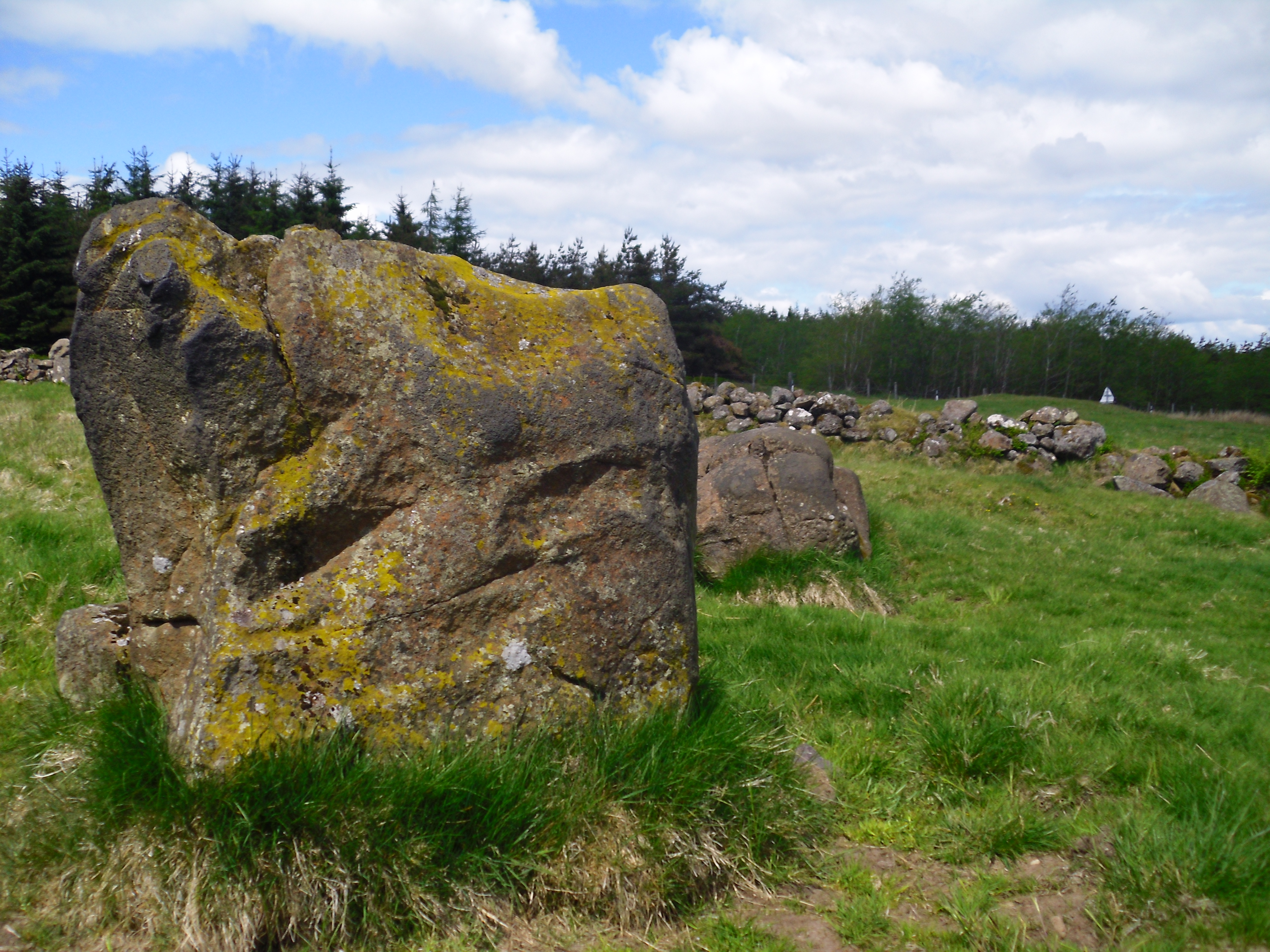
Standing stones

Two Menhirs are located on the top of the Gleniffer Braes. The stone described by the Canmore database as Stone A is 1.2metres high, 1.2metres wide and 0.9metres thick. The stone described as Stone B is 0.8metres high, 1.5metres long and 1.0metres wide. The stones are understood to have been placed in position during the time of the Druids.

== Recreation ==
There are several miles of walking paths through woodland and moorland areas. Some of the paths lead to wider walking networks out with the park, including Brandy Burn way and the Fereneze Braes paths. There is also a ranger service from the local council who provide guided walks. Cyclists and horse riders also use the park. A playground, picnicking, dog walking, bird watching, and kite flying, are found in the park. Seasonal activities include Easter egg rolling and sledging.

== See also ==
- Fereneze Braes
- Cathkin Braes
- Dams to Darnley Country Park
