= Neilston Pad =

Hill in East Renfrewshire, Scotland

- "The Pad"
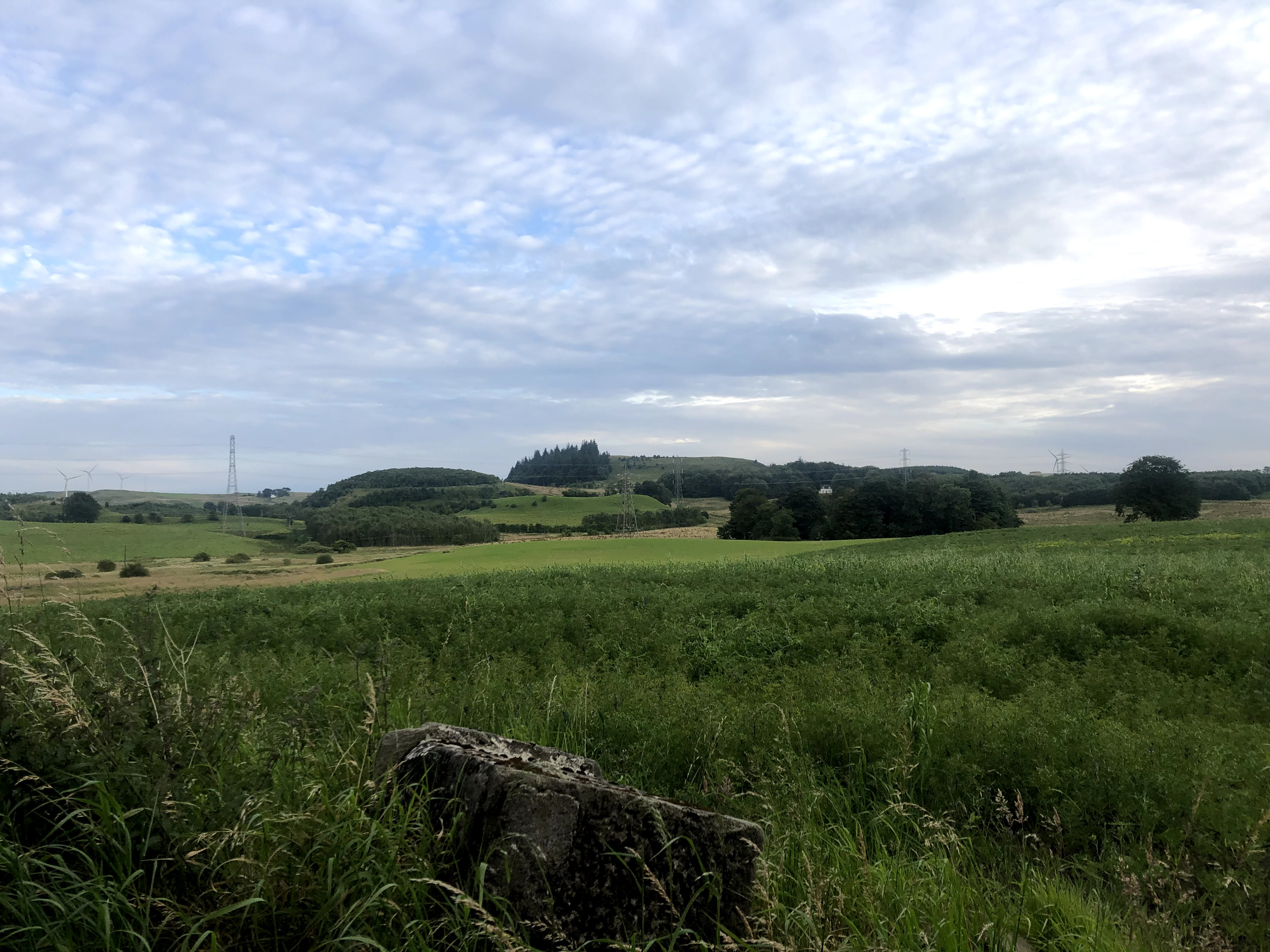
- Neilston Pad from Kirkton Road

Highest point
- Elevation: 261 m (856 ft)
- Parent peak: Corse Hill
- Coordinates: 55.765251°N 4.42957°W

Geography

Neilston Pad, referred to locally as The Pad, is a distinctive hill in East Renfrewshire, situated a mile (1.5 km) south of the village of Neilston.

Its highest point is 261 metres (856 ft) and is characterised by a relatively flat summit plateau surrounded by steep slopes and distinctive forestry on its eastern side. Its odd shape and prominence make it easily identifiable and visible from many areas in Glasgow.

The area was managed by Elderslie Estates from the 1990s until it was sold to a private buyer or consortium in 2021.

== Walking and public access ==
Neilston Pad has a well constructed gravel path surrounding it extending to access paths from the north and south. A number of secondary paths exist, one of which leads to the summit.

== Summit ==
There is large stone cairn on the plateau which is easily mistaken as being the summit. The true summit is marked by a much smaller cairn approximately 50 metres (160 ft) east of the larger one.

== Reservoirs ==
The area surrounding Neilston Pad includes a number of reservoirs. Craighall Reservoir, known locally as Craighall Dam, lies to the west, Snypes Reservoir to the east and a smaller body of water sits north known as Keepers Dam.

== Forestry ==
The hill itself has extensive forestry on its eastern and southern sides as well as large areas alongside its eastern side.

In 2019 up to 20,000 trees were felled to prevent the spread of phytophthora ramorum – a fungus-like pathogen that can kill or severely damage larch trees. The felling damaged and disturbed a number of well utilised walking and access routes mainly around Craighall Reservoir.

== Gallery ==
Photographs of Neilston Pad and surrounding area

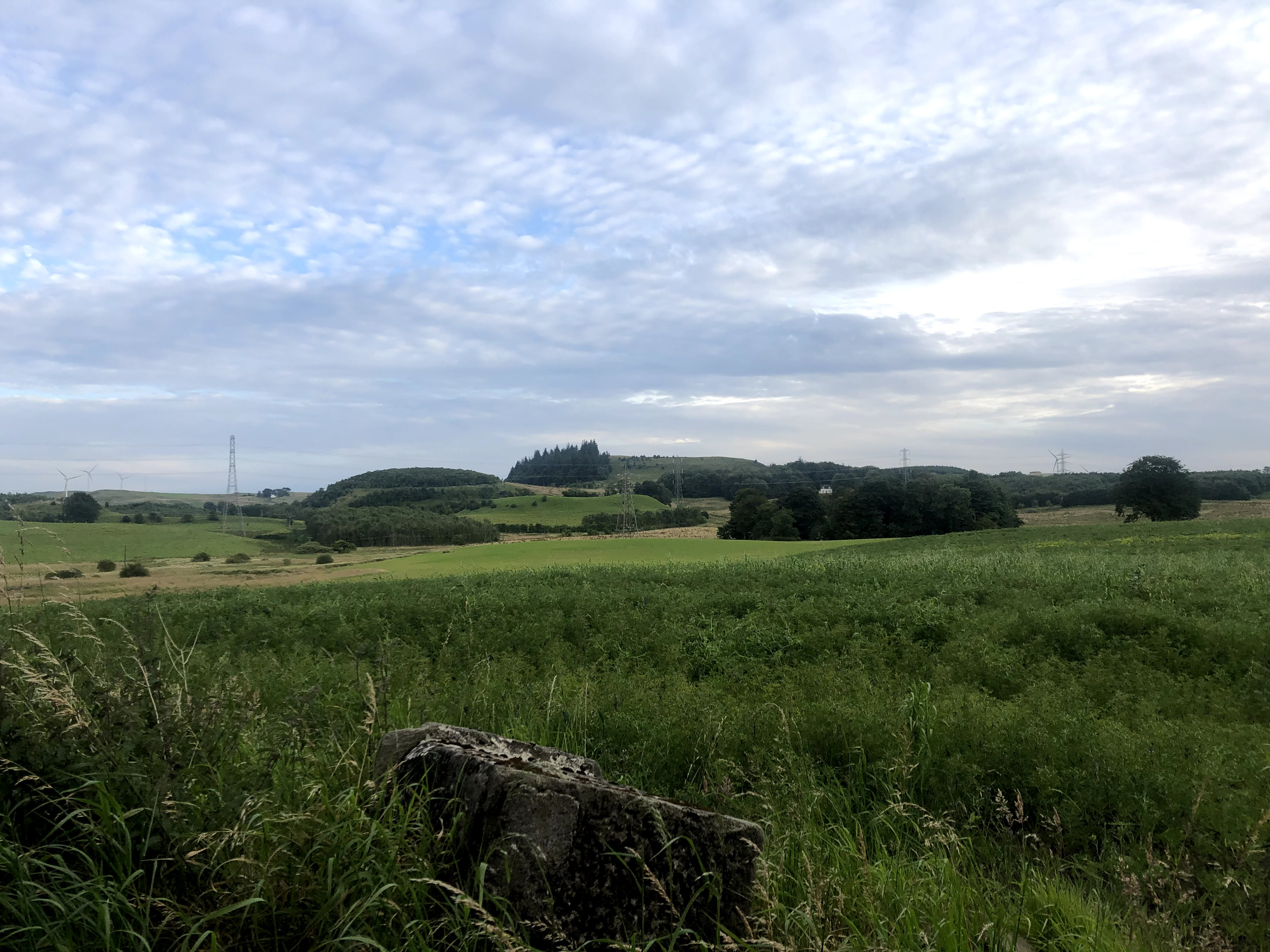
Neilston Pad from Kirkton Road

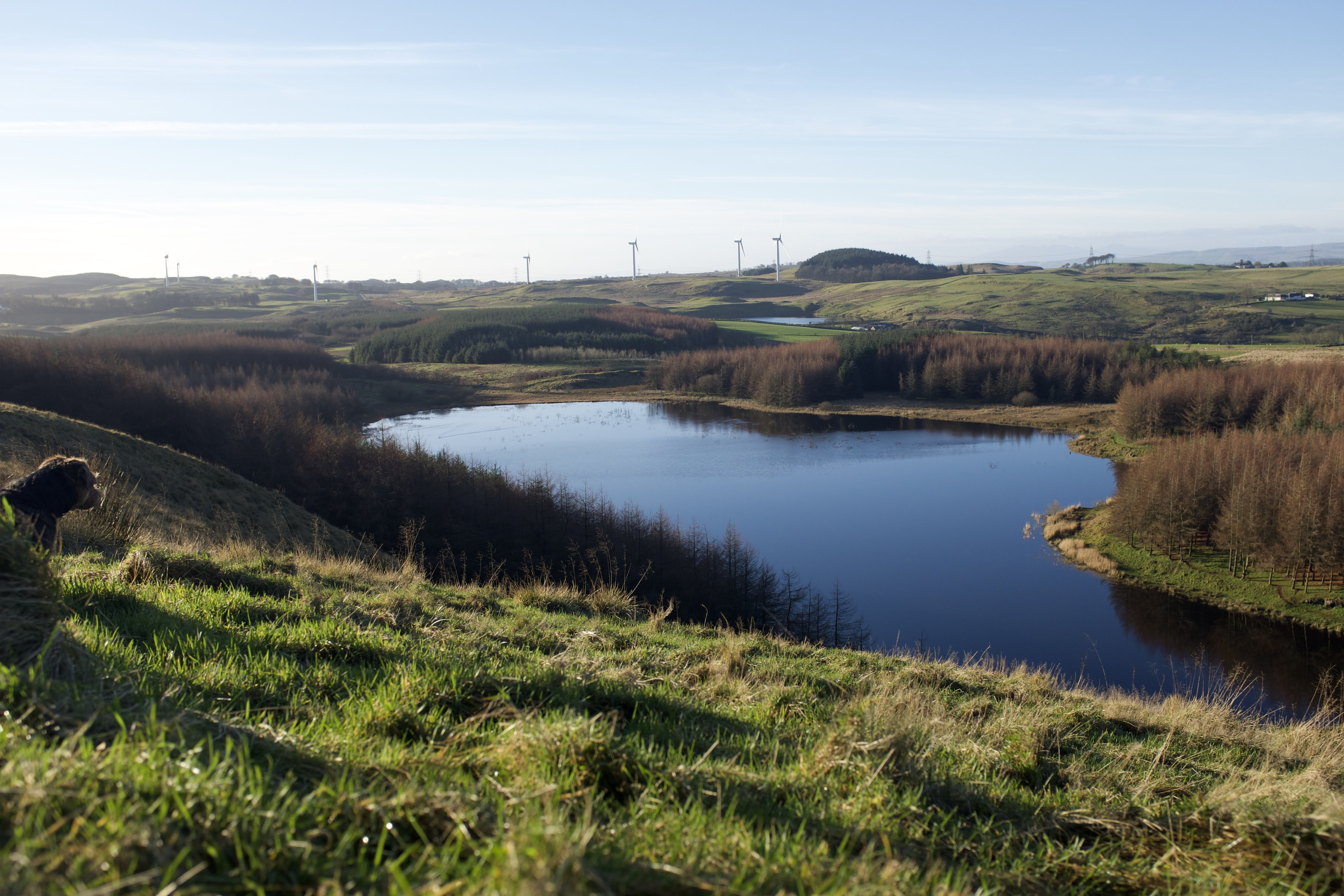
Craighall Reservoir from Neilston Pad

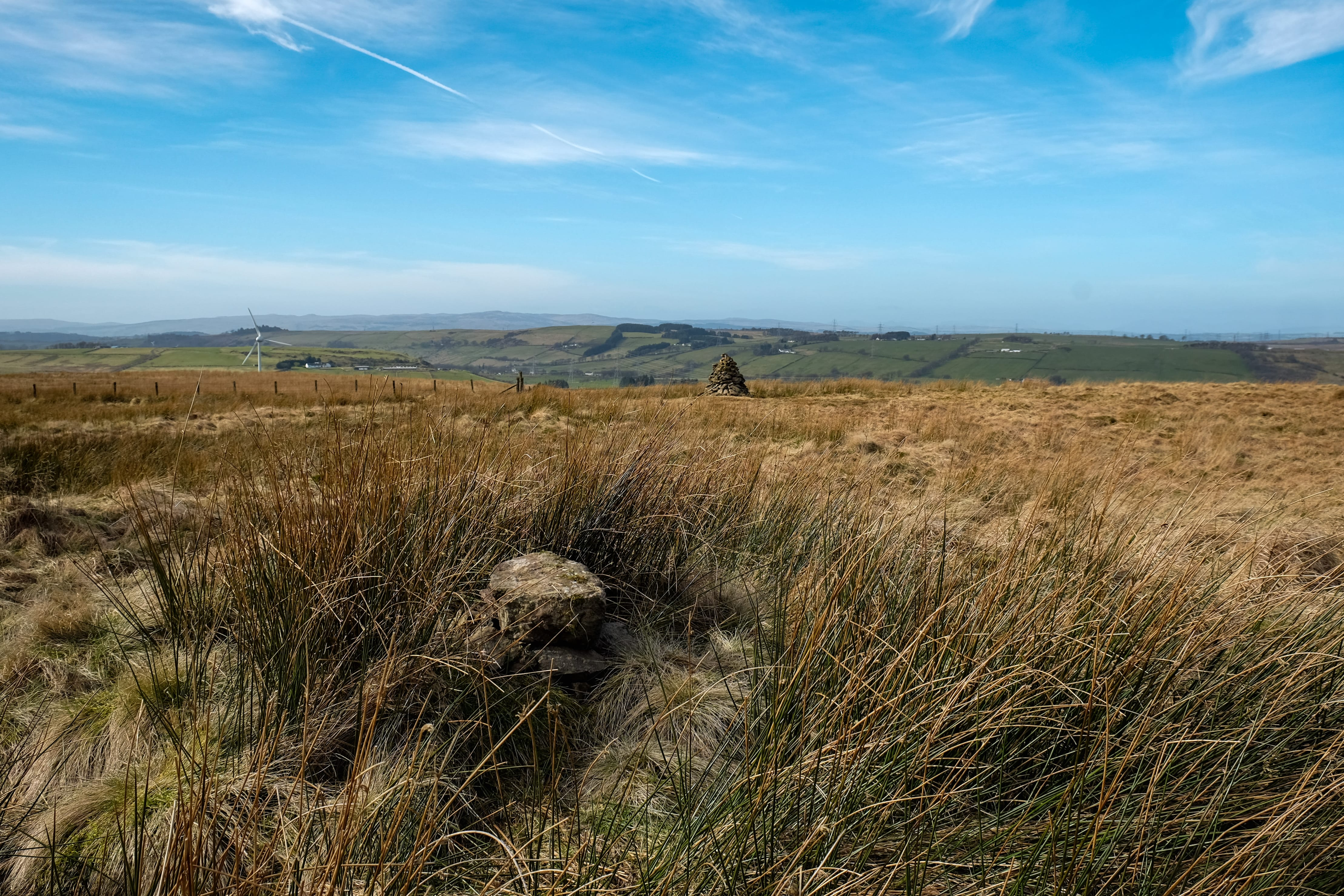
Neilston Pad true summit

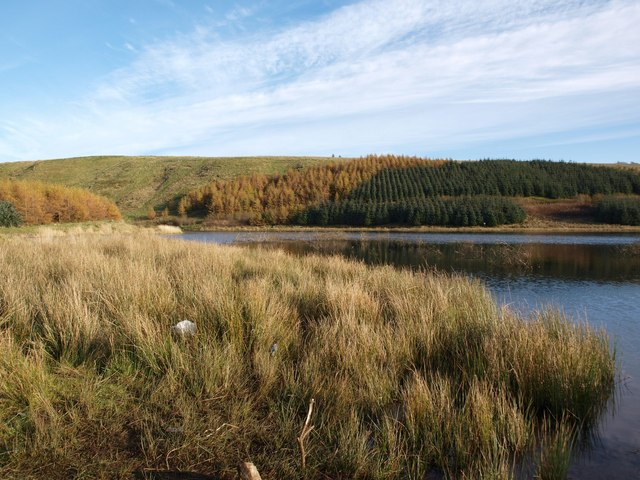
Looking towards the Neilston Pad from Craighall Reservoir

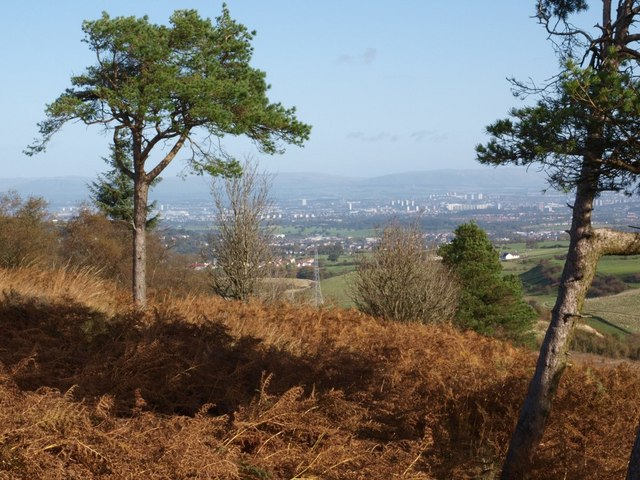
Looking north towards Glasgow

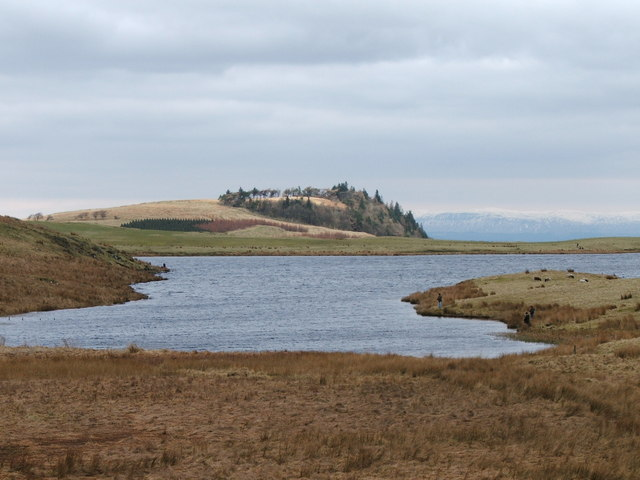
Neilston Pad with the Harelaw Dam in the foreground
