= Neilston =

Village in East Renfrewshire, Scotland

Neilston: Scottish Gaelic: Baile Nèill; Scots: Neilstoun
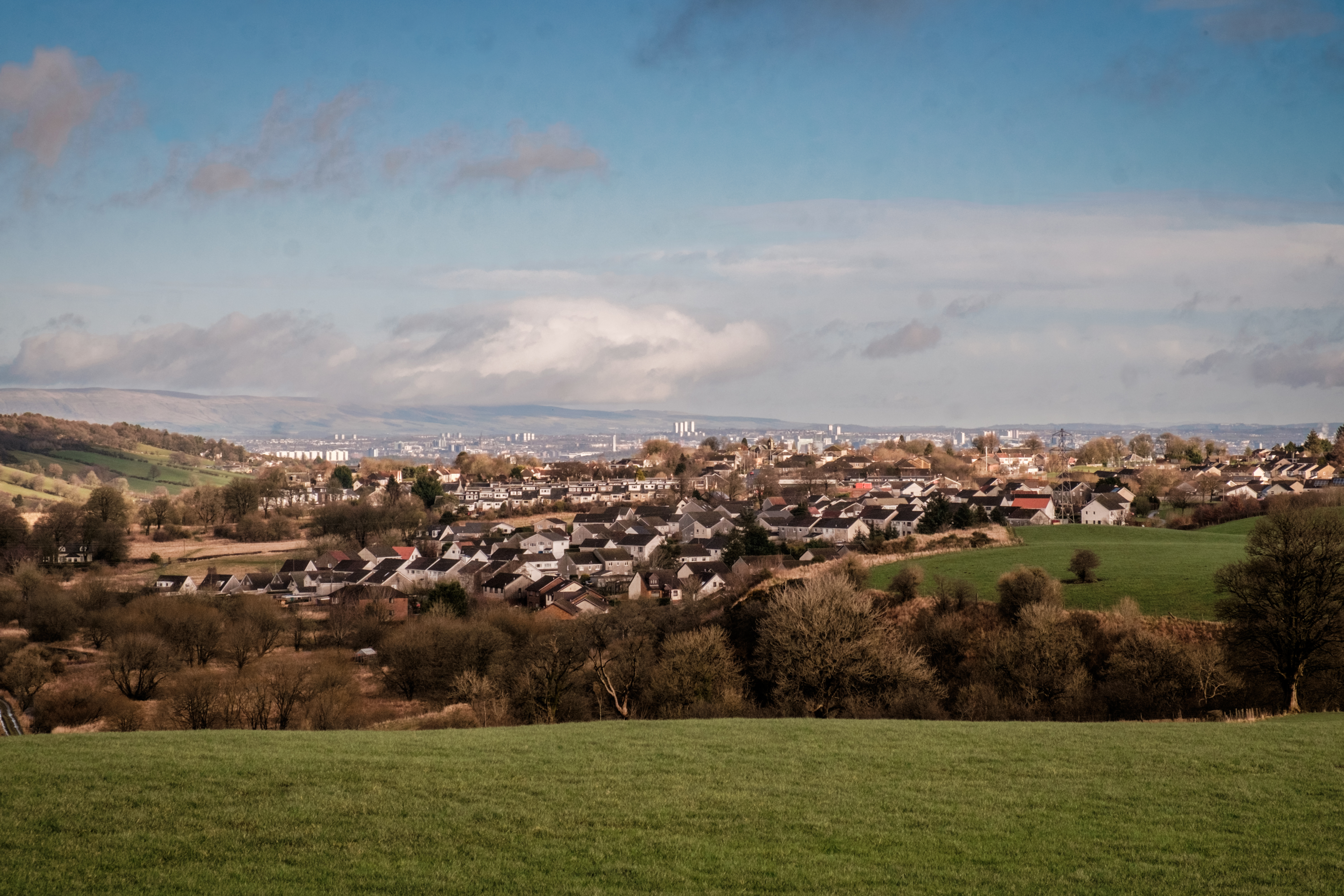
- A view of Neilston from the southwest, with the city of Glasgow in the distance

- Location within East Renfrewshire
- Area: 0.45 sq mi (1.2 km^{2})
- Population: 5,170 (2020)
  - Density: 11,484/sq mi (4,434/km^{2})
- OS grid reference: NS480572
  - Edinburgh: 44 mi (71 km) EbN
  - London: 343 mi (552 km) SSE
- Council area: East Renfrewshire
- Lieutenancy area: Renfrewshire
- Country: Scotland
- Sovereign state: United Kingdom
- Post town: GLASGOW
- Postcode district: G78
- Dialling code: 0141
- Police: Scotland
- Fire: Scottish
- Ambulance: Scottish
- UK Parliament: East Renfrewshire
- Scottish Parliament: Renfrewshire West and Levern Valley

Neilston (Scots: Neilstoun, Scottish Gaelic: Baile Nèill, pronounced [paləˈnɛːʎ]) is a village and parish in East Renfrewshire in the west central Lowlands of Scotland. It is in the Levern Valley, two miles (three kilometres) southwest of Barrhead, 3 3/4 miles (6 kilometres) south of Paisley, and 5 3/4 miles (9.5 kilometres) south-southwest of Renfrew, at the southwestern fringe of the Greater Glasgow conurbation. Neilston is a dormitory village with a resident population of just over 5,000 people.

Neilston is mentioned in documents from the 12th century, when the feudal lord Robert de Croc, endowed a chapel to Paisley Abbey to the North. Neilston Parish Church—a Category B listed building—is said to be on the site of this original chapel and has been at the centre of the community since 1163. Little remains of the original structure. Before industrialisation, Neilston was a scattered farming settlement composed of a series of single-storey houses, many of them thatched. Some domestic weaving was carried out using local flax. Water power from nearby streams ground corn and provided a suitable environment for bleaching the flax.

The urbanisation and development of Neilston came largely with the Industrial Revolution. Industrial scale textile processing was introduced to Neilston around the middle of the 18th century with the building of several cotton mills. Neilston became a centre for cotton and calico bleaching and printing in the 18th century, which developed into a spinning and dying industry, and continued into the early 20th century. Although Neilston is known as a former milling village, agriculture has played, and continues to play, an economic role. The annual Neilston Agricultural Show is an important trading and cultural event for farmers from southwest Scotland each spring.

Although heavy industry died out in the latter half of the 20th century, as part of Scotland's densely populated Central Belt, Neilston has continued to grow as a commuter village, supported by its position between Paisley and Glasgow, from roughly 1,000 people in 1800 to 5,168 in 2001. Expansion continues due to several new housing developments.

== History ==
Local historians have proposed various theories for the origin of the name Neilston. Although the first element is likely to derive from either the Gaelic forename "Niall" (genitive "Nèill") or else from the French Nigel, there is disagreement as to whether the second element represents the English "stone" or "town". The earliest mention of Neilston is in the Chartulary of Paisley Abbey, which mentions that the Anglo-Norman knight, Robert Croc of Crocstown (Crookston), assigned the patronage of Neilstoun to the monks of St Mirren's in 1163, on condition that masses should be regularly said for the benefit of his soul. G. W. S. Barrow suggested that the settlement may be identified with the follower of Walter fitz Alan, Lord of Kyle and Strathgryfe (and liege lord of Robert Croc), named Nigel de Cotentin.

Despite this, some writers have given etymological explanations which post-date 1163. For instance, it has been written that "Neil" was a General of King Haakon IV of Norway, who, fleeing from the Battle of Largs (1263), was overtaken in this locality and put to death. According to the custom of the age a burial mound was supposedly erected over his grave and the locality ultimately received the name of the General. In a similar semi-legendary popular etymology, Neilston's origin was said to derive from a stone erected over the grave of a Highland chief named Neil who was allegedly killed at the Battle of Harlaw (1411), in the reign of King James I of Scotland.

Before its recorded history began, and possibly before its founding, the territory of what became Neilston is known to have formed part of the ancient Kingdom of Strathclyde. Evidence attests that Neilston is much older than its larger neighbour Barrhead, as the first recorded mention of Barrhead was almost 600 years after Neilston's mention in the Chartulary of Paisley Abbey of 1163. The chartulary dealt with the foundation of the Clunaic Monastery in Paisley and its relationship to a chapel in Neilston, which were both answerable to Rome via the Clunaic Movement. Because of its chapel, which later became a parish church, Neilston was the most important settlement in the Levern Valley and much of rural Renfrewshire.

In the Middle Ages Neilston's position in the Barrhead Gap, a pass linking Ayrshire to Glasgow, gave it strategic importance. Robert Croc may have had a fort or watchtower at Coldoun in Neilston in the 12th century. "Doun" is a corruption of "dun" meaning castle or fort, and the prefix perhaps implies the lack of physical warmth within the tower or the greeting received by unwelcome guests. Despite this distinction of local importance, Neilston remained a scattered community of small dwellings and farms, changing only with the arrival of the Industrial Revolution.

In the 17th century Neilston shared in a national hysteria about witchcraft that plagued Scotland. In 1650 a number of people from Inverkip, Linwood and Neilston were accused of witchcraft. However, they passed certain tests which would disprove them to be witches. In 1697, Christian Shaw of Lambroughton succeeded in convincing a Minister that she was a victim of witchcraft. A Commission of Enquiry, which included the Laird of Glanderston, was appointed to investigate. As a result of the investigation, later known as the Paisley Witch Trials, four women and three men were arrested and eventually condemned to death and executed at Paisley. The Minister of Neilston Church, the Reverend David Brown, officiated at the hanging; he preached to them before the execution "beseeching them to turn to God, God having exercised a great deal of long-suffering towards them".

The foundations of a textile industry in Neilston were laid by the monks of Paisley Abbey who mastered the local woollen trade in the Middle Ages. Neilston became a centre for cotton and calico bleaching and printing in the 18th century. This developed into a spinning and dying industry and continued into the early 20th century. Bleachfields and textile processing brought rapid socioeconomic growth to the village. Neilston was one of the earliest centres of textile manufacture during the Industrial Revolution; the process of bleaching linens was introduced into Neilston in 1765, and a mill in the parish was the second erected in Scotland. By 1780, cotton manufacturing and bleaching had become the main industry in Neilston; the clear busy waters of the River Levern being well suited for power and processing. In the "Old" Statistical Account of Scotland (1792), compiled under the direction of Sir John Sinclair of Ulbster, Neilston was noted to have two cotton mills employing together more than 300 people, over half of them children. The local Minister was concerned for the children's welfare, remarking on how they missed school to work in the mills where their lungs would be filled with cotton fluff and their skin spoiled by machine oil.

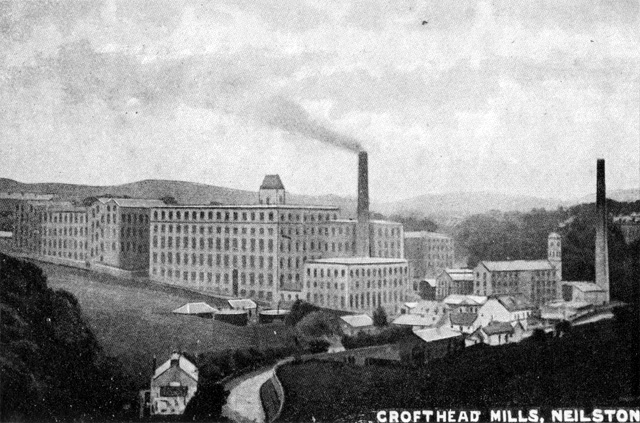
Crofthead Mill, a local landmark, was one of seven large cotton mills on the banks of the River Levern.

Crofthead Mill (known locally as Neilston Mill) was established in 1792. It was one of seven large cotton mills on the banks of the River Levern between Neilston and Dovecothall, and although it closed for business in the early 1990s, it is the only industrial structure from this period still standing. Because of the large size of the complex, coupled with its short distance from the main residential core of Neilston, it was described in 1830, at the peak of the industry's prosperity, as "a little town of its self". Other mills and factories have existed but have been demolished, however Broadlie Mill from around 1792 is currently still a working site now called Clyde Leather and Gateside village now mainly a residential area with no signs of the Spinning Mill.

Following its period of rapid industrialisation, in 1904 about 400 mill houses were constructed forming Lintmill Terrace and its neighbouring streets in what was then the non-contiguous Holehouse area of the Parish of Neilston. Additional housing schemes in the 1920s and 1930s led to Holehouse and old Neilston becoming a single continuously connected urban area, described as that of a "sizable small township". Since this time, much rebuilding and further expansion has taken place. Gentrification projects since 2000 have included the refurbishment of the parish church in 2004, an experimental public space renewal initiative in 2005 and the renovation of Nether Kirkton House, a mansion.

== Governance ==
Neilston is represented by several tiers of elected government. Neilston Community Council forms the lowest tier of governance whose statutory role is to communicate local opinion to local and central government. It is one of ten community councils of the East Renfrewshire council area. East Renfrewshire Council, the unitary local authority for Neilston, is based at Giffnock, close to the border with the Glasgow City council area, and is the executive, deliberative and legislative body responsible for local governance. The Scottish Parliament is responsible for devolved matters such as education, health and justice, while reserved matters are dealt with by the Parliament of the United Kingdom.

The territory of what became Neilston anciently formed part of the Kingdom of Strathclyde. It has lain within the county boundaries of Renfrewshire from a very early time. Neilston emerged as a parish and administrative unit in 1170, and was for many years under the lordship of the Mures of Caldwell whose tombs are at the parish church. The parish was eight miles (thirteen kilometres) in length and by from two to four miles (three to six kilometres) in breadth, encompassing six sevenths of what is now the town of Barrhead. Neilston Parish Council, a local body with limited power, was established in 1895, following the Local Government (Scotland) Act 1894, and abolished in 1930 following the Local Government (Scotland) Act 1929. In 1890, Neilston fell under the authority of Renfrewshire County Council, where it remained until 1975 when the county was superseded by the regional council area of Strathclyde. In 1903, Neilston was within the Paisley Small Debt Court District and Poor Combination. From 1975 to 1996, Neilston was in the Renfrew District of Strathclyde until the two-tier regions and districts of Scotland were abolished. Since 1996 it has formed part of the unitary East Renfrewshire council area; East Renfrewshire Council is the local authority. Neilston remains part of Renfrewshire for purposes of registration and Lieutenancy.

Neilston forms part of the multi member ward 1 of East Renfrewshire Council, namely Neilston, Uplawmoor and Newton Mearns North. Four Councillors are elected using the proportional Single Transferable Vote (STV) system. The current elected members are Charlie Gilbert (Conservative) Paul O'Kane (Labour) Elaine Green (Labour) and Tony Buchanan (SNP).

Neilston is part of the county constituency of East Renfrewshire, electing one Member of Parliament (MP) to the House of Commons of the Parliament of the United Kingdom. Kirsten Oswald of the Scottish National Party was elected as MP for East Renfrewshire (UK Parliament constituency) in the 2019 general election. Before the constituency's creation in 2005, Neilston lay in the Eastwood constituency. For purposes of the Scottish Parliament, Neilston forms part of the Renfrewshire South Constituency, represented by Tom Arthur of the Scottish National Party. In addition to this Neilston is represented by seven regional MSPs from the West of Scotland electoral region.

== Geography ==
At 55°47′4″N 4°25′24″W (55.784°, -4.423°) Neilston is in Scotland's Central Lowlands. The community is 430 feet (131 metres) above sea level, two miles (three kilometres) southwest of Barrhead town centre, 5 1/2 miles (9 kilometres) south of Paisley, five miles (eight kilometres) west of Newton Mearns and ten miles (sixteen kilometres) southwest of Glasgow. The River Levern flows to the west of the town and under the iconic Crofthead Mill. The river itself has its source at nearby Long Loch. It flows eastwards through Neilston towards Barrhead, before flowing into the White Cart Water.

The topography of the areas around Neilston are varied. To the east, the land is relatively flat, but to the south and west it is steeper, rising to heights of 400–900 ft (122–274 m) above the level of the River Clyde. The highest points in the surrounding areas are Neilston Pad and the Corkendale-law, at about 853 and 900 ft (260 and 274 m) above sea level, respectively. Neilston Pad is characterised by a craggy face on its eastern side. Between these hills is the valley of the River Levern. In this valley is the A736 to Barrhead. The soil in the eastern parts of Neilston is a dry loam, occasionally intermixed with gravel. The soil in the hills near Neilston is considered to be largely infertile, whilst to the south and southwest there is an expansive moorland which extends as far as Darvel and Strathaven. The local geology is represented by basalt. The surrounding landscape is dominated by Duncarnock, the resistant core of an ancient and long extinct volcano, known locally as 'the Craigie'.

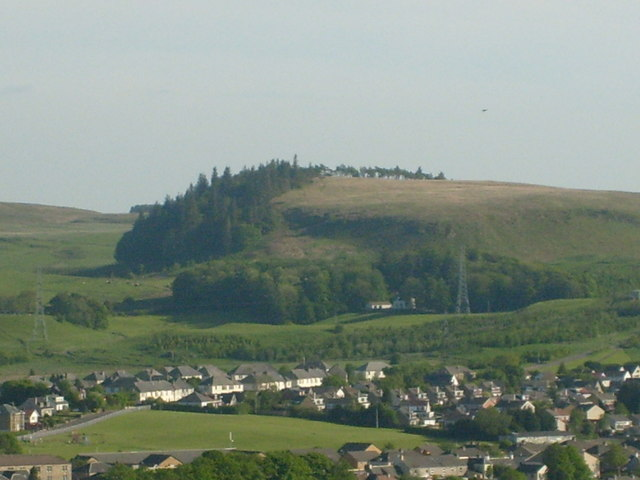
Neilston Pad is a high point in Neilston, characterised by a craggy face on its eastern side

Neilston experiences a temperate maritime climate, like much of the British Isles, with relatively cool summers and mild winters. Regular but generally light precipitation occurs throughout the year. There is also a spring nearby.

Neilston's town centre is characterised by its mixture of 19th and 20th century detached cottages, single and two-story buildings. Several mansion houses were built for the owners of former mills and factories. Many of Neilston's dwellings are painted in whites or ivories. In his book Ordnance Survey of Scotland (1884), Francis Hindes Groome remarked that Neilston "presents an old-fashioned yet neat and compact appearance", a view echoed by Hugh McDonald in Rambles Round Glasgow (1910), who stated that Neilston "is a compact, neat, and withal somewhat old-fashioned little township", although continued that it has "few features calling for special remark". It is frequently described as a quiet dormitory village, although some sources from around the turn of the 20th century describe Neilston as a town. Neilston is not contiguous with any other settlement, and according to the General Register Office for Scotland, does not form part of Greater Glasgow, despite being very close.

The Killoch Burn and glen, on the other side of the Levern northwest of Neilston are associated with witches, because at low water the numerous pot-holes or rock-cut basins have worn into one another, giving the area an unusual shape. Locals named some of these the witch's floor, hearth, cradle, water-stoup and grave.

== Demography ==
Neilston compared according to UK Census 2001
	Neilston	East Renfrewshire	Scotland
Total population	5,168	89,300	5,062,011
Foreign born	1.5%	3.8%	3.8%
Over 75 years old	4.8%	6.9%	7.1%
Unemployed	3.5%	2.5%	3.9%

According to the United Kingdom Census 2001, the census locality (village and sub-area) of Neilston had a total resident population of 5,168, or 6% of the total of East Renfrewshire. This figure, combined with an area of 0.45 square miles (1.2 km^{2}), provides Neilston with a population density figure of 11,484 inhabitants per square mile (4,434/km^{2}). This is higher than the average population density of Scotland (at 166/sq mi or 64/km^{2}) and nearby Glasgow (at 8,526/sq mi or 3,292/km^{2}).

The median age of males and females living in Neilston was 37 and 38 years respectively, compared to 37 and 39 years for those in the whole of Scotland. Forty six percent were married, 3.2% were cohabiting couples, 11.3% were lone parent families and 25.5% of households were made up of individuals.

The place of birth of the village's residents was 98.5% United Kingdom (including 94% from Scotland), 0.4% Republic of Ireland, 0.4% from other European Union countries, and 0.8% from elsewhere in the world. The economic activity of residents aged 16–74 was 45.4% in full-time employment, 11.4% in part-time employment, 5.2% self-employed, 3.5% unemployed, 4% students with jobs, 4% students without jobs, 11.4% retired, 4% looking after home or family, 6.8% permanently sick or disabled, and 3.5% economically inactive for other reasons. Compared with the average demographics of Scotland, Neilston has low proportions of people born outside the United Kingdom, and people over 75 years of age.

Following the Scottish Reformation in 1560, there was no Roman Catholic place of worship in Neilston until 1861; it has been said that there was no resident Roman Catholic community in the parish in this time, the parishioners instead being Presbyterian. It was not until around the time of the Second Industrial Revolution, when the demand for labour was great, that Irish people began to come to Neilston and other parts of Scotland in increasing numbers, many of them because of The Great Hunger in the mid-19th century. As a result, Neilston, like neighbouring Glasgow, is home to a significant number of Catholic Irish-Scots. St Thomas's, part of the Roman Catholic Diocese of Paisley, was built around 1861 to accommodate the new Catholic community.

== Economy ==
Long existing as a rural settlement, Neilston's economy was historically driven by farming, although a trade in handloom woven garments from the village's cottage industry also existed from very early times. Grain mills and watermills were operating in Neilston by 1667.

Due to its supply of hydropower from the River Levern, Neilston, like neighbouring Barrhead, developed factories and cotton mills after the arrival of the Industrial Revolution. Neilston fostered a flourishing textile processing industry. At the peak of business, the River Levern was lined with bleachfields, cotton mills and calico printfields. Passing through the ownership of a series of successful companies, Crofthead Mill was once the biggest producer of spun cotton in Renfrewshire. Thread from Crofthead, and thus Neilston, was traded across the world. It is claimed that thread from Crofthead Mill held together the boots of the climbing team led by Chris Bonington on the British Everest Expedition in 1975.

Neilston Agricultural Show is a cattle show, sheepdog trial and sports and arts festival held near the village on the first Saturday of every May with a tradition beginning in the early 19th century. It began as a result of a dispute between two farmers from the village. Each farmer had a prized bull that he said was better than the other's. In a bid to settle the argument, the farmers arranged a contest that would be judged by the other farmers in the area. It is not documented who had the better bull, but the contest grew into an annual event that has become a local custom which is celebrated each year at the end of the show with the burning of a 50 ft tall wickerman.

Although agriculture continues to a limited extent on the village's outskirts, Neilston's textile processing industry has diminished. Since deindustrialisation, Neilston is a commuter village with significant numbers of its inhabitants travelling to the major urban centres of Glasgow, Paisley and Barrhead for work. The village has retained a selection of amenities from local shops for local people, leisure facilities, and schooling however. The Barrhead News, a local newspaper published by Clyde and Forth Press, reports on Neilston, Barrhead, Nitshill and Darnley.

In 2005 the Clydesdale Bank closed its branch at Neilston, leaving it without a bank. In 2006 Neilston Development Trust utilised the Land Reform Act to purchase the bank building for community usage with the aid of a grant of £210,000 from the Big Lottery Fund. This was the first time this legislation had been successfully used in an urban area. The premises are used as a community café, a service information point, office space and meeting rooms. The trust has been involved in a community energy project, the Neilston Community Wind Farm, which installed four turbines with a capacity of 10MW in 2013.

== Landmarks ==
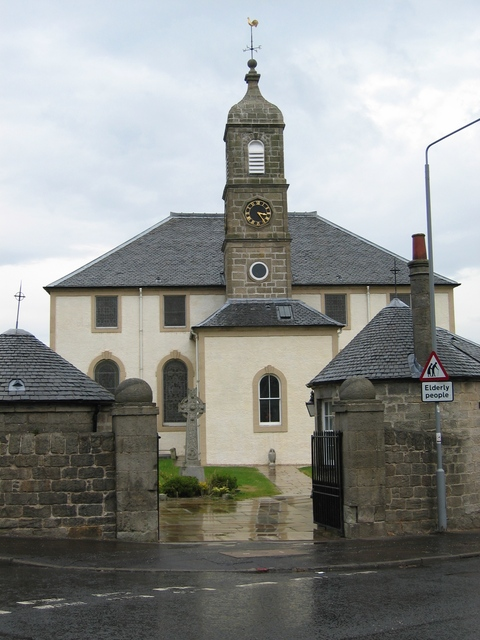
Neilston Parish Church, known to have existed as the site of a Christian place of worship since 1163

A chapel at Neilston was first recorded in 1163 in a charter of Paisley Abbey. It was commissioned by Sir Robert Croc, as part of a feudal requirement by the High Steward of Scotland, Walter fitz Alan. The original Neilston Kirk was one storey high, and was rebuilt in 1762 to accommodate the growing population of the parish. The only remaining parts of the original building are a Gothic window in a back wall and the burial vault of the Mure family of Caldwell, including the tomb of Laird, scholar and MP for Renfrewshire, William Mure (1799–1860). Between 1796 and 1798 the roof was taken off the church and an additional storey constructed, making space for a gallery to accommodate the growing population of Neilston. The structure has a spire, a clock, and 940 sittings. The old graveyard is centuries old and has a headstone dating from the 15th century. The church is part of the Church of Scotland, and has a Category B listing from Historic Environment Scotland.

In 1559, in the Scottish Reformation, an image of Mary mother of Jesus was taken from Neilston Parish Church and thrown into a pool of the River Levern. The pool ever since has been known as the Midge Hole. One of Neilston Parish Church's most celebrated ministers was Dr Alexander Fleming and his Life (1883) contains much of interest relating to Neilston. In 1826, despite enlargement of the church, it was too small to accommodate the population and the Heritors demanded payment of seat rents for those attending services. Dr Fleming proceeded to preach from a tent erected in the graveyard for a period of about eight years, insisting that "the people of the Parish are entitled to hear the gospel without money or price." The case went to the House of Lords and although it was not successful, the parishioners were subsequently able to return to the church and take their places without paying rent and with no further opposition from the Heritors. In 2003, in a major refurbishment, six skeletons were found beneath the floorboards of the church. Initially sealed off as a crime scene, archeologists from the University of Glasgow confirmed the skeletons were around 400 years old. A local historian suggested they could be the bones of former priests.

Crofthead Mill in Neilston is a Category B listed building. It is Neilston's largest and oldest cotton mill, dating in part from 1792 but predominantly 1880 after much of the original building was destroyed by fire. The mill is now used by J & M Murdoch & Son Ltd., a transport, waste disposal and recycling company. Nether Kirkton House is a mansion and the former home of whisky heiress Marion Buchanan. It was Category B listed but had this status removed in 2017.

== Transport ==
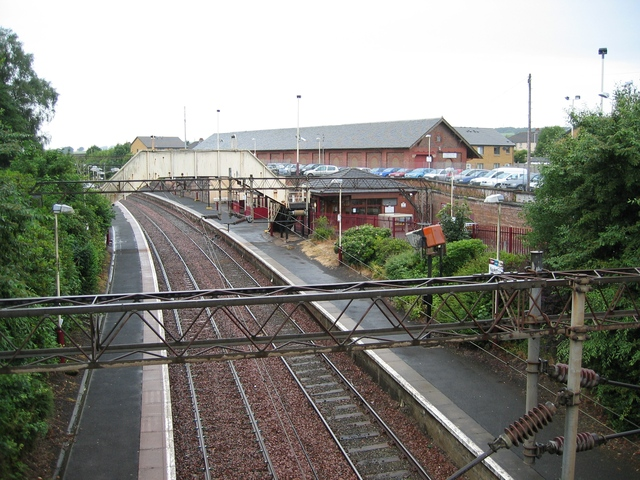
Neilston railway station

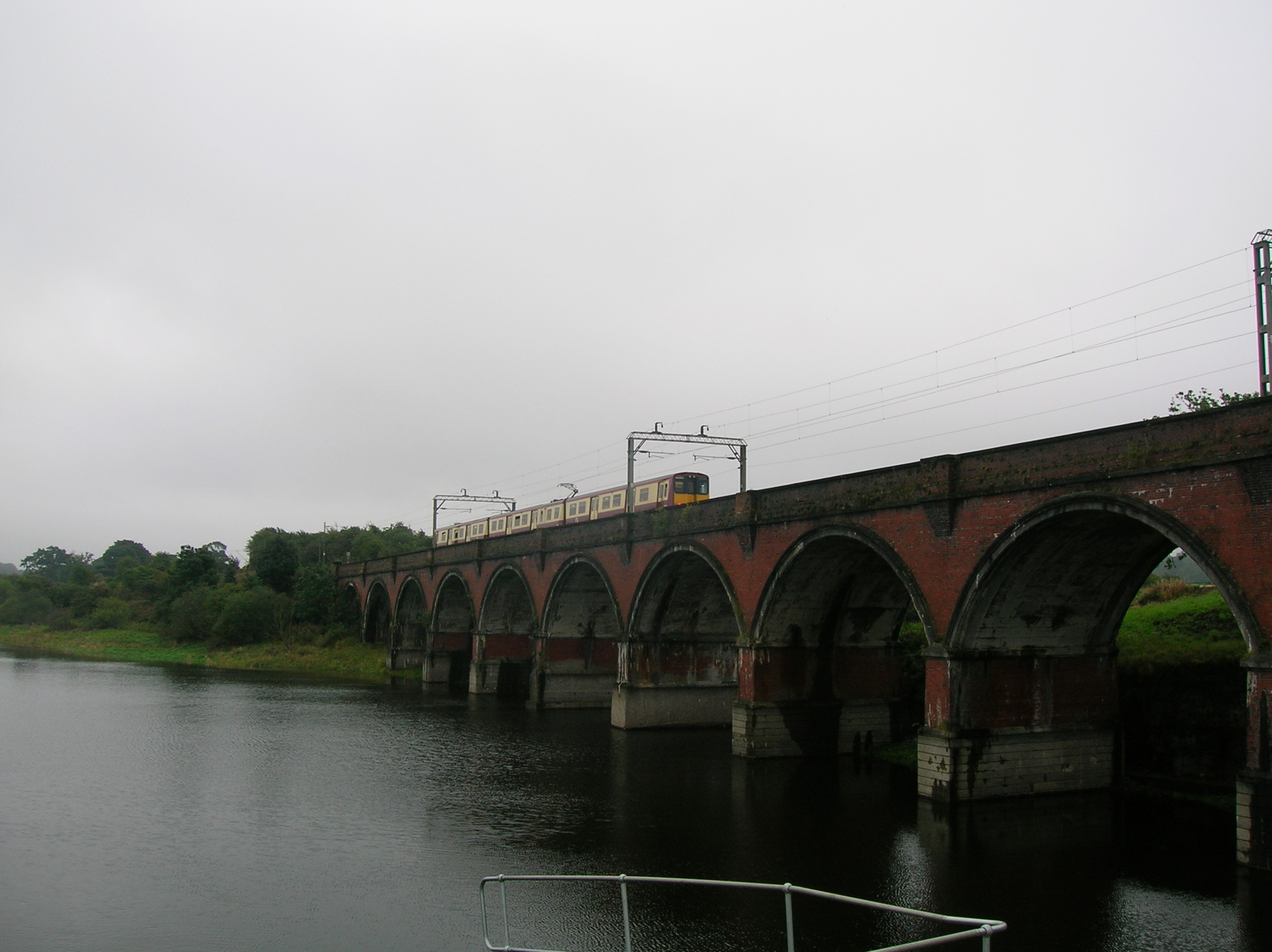
Waulkmill Glen reservoir viaduct, between Neilston and Patterton

Travellers historically used the Levern Valley as a route to and from the Ayrshire coast. An ancient road from Glasgow to Kilmarnock known as the Flush was the most common path and can still be seen near Neilston. The major A736 road (Lochlibo Road) from Irvine to Braehead runs to the north of Neilston. The nearest motorway is the M77, of which Junction 4 at Newton Mearns is the interchange for Neilston.

Neilston railway station, opened 1 May 1903, is the western terminus of the Cathcart Circle Lines from Glasgow Central station. The station is managed by ScotRail and is 11 3/4 miles (19 kilometres) southeast of Glasgow Central. It was constructed when the Lanarkshire and Ayrshire Railway built its line through the village to the coast at Ardrossan. Neilston Low was a Glasgow, Barrhead and Kilmarnock Joint Railway station, but closed in 1966.

The closest airport is Glasgow International, six miles (ten kilometres) north of Neilston.

== Education ==
A school for children of landowners and wealthy farmers was established in Neilston Parish by 1600, under the supervision of the Kirk Session; ordinary peasants remained illiterate. Neilston has two primary schools, but no secondary schools. St Thomas' Primary School is a feeder Roman Catholic primary school for St Luke's High School in Barrhead. Neilston Primary School is a non-denominational feeder primary school for both Barrhead High School in Barrhead and Eastwood High School in Newton Mearns.

Neilston Primary School was founded in 1880 and the current building was built in the late 1960s with an open-plan extension completed in 1991, With a new campus plan in 2023 shared with St. Thomas'. The school roll was 350 in June 2005. St Thomas' Primary, linked with the local Catholic church of the same name, was built in 1964 in Broadlie Road beside the church where the old building was demolished. The school roll was 186 in 2007.

Both buildings are planned to be demolished and a new shared campus is under construction behind the current location of Neilston Primary, which was opened in late March 2024.

== Sports ==
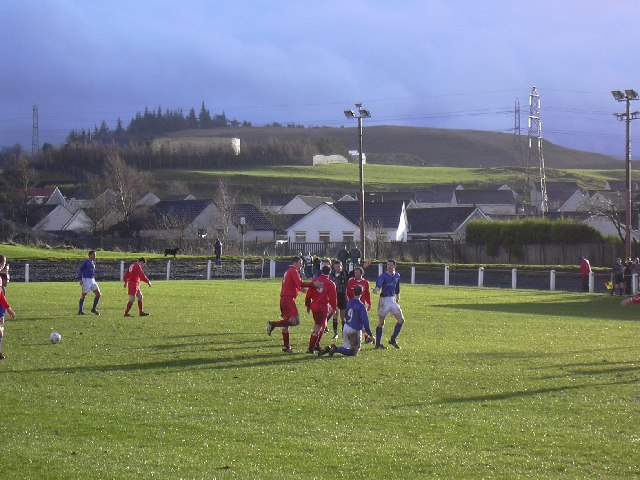
Brig O'Lea Stadium is home of Neilston F.C.

Neilston F.C. is a football club playing in the West of Scotland Football League (established in 2020 - previously the club operated within the Scottish Junior Football Association since their establishment). Formed in 1945, they operate from the Brig O' Lea Stadium in Neilston and play in red and white kits. Their nickname is 'The Farmer's Boys', and their anthem is the folk song, A Farmer's Boy.

There are two 11 a-side grass football pitches at Kingston Playing Fields in Neilston, these are maintained by East Renfrewshire Council and utilised by amateur and youth teams.

Neilston Leisure Centre has a 25-metre (82 ft) swimming pool and a gym. Activities in the leisure centre include casual swimming, swimming lessons, pool fun sessions, fitness classes, sauna, gym sessions. It has a mural from the 1960s.

Neilston has two lawn bowling clubs: Neilston Bowling Club formed in 1903 and Crofthead Bowling Club formed in 1921.

The Neilston Agricultural Show (an annual Cattle show) is held on the first Saturday of May each year and hosts many competitive sporting events including tug of war, relay races (between local schools), equine sports and dog agility. The showground is also the start and finish point for The Pad Race, a 4.5 mile trail running race where entrants lap Neilston Pad.

Neilston formerly hosted two senior football clubs which played in the Scottish Cup in the 1870s and 1880s - Glenkilloch F.C. and an earlier Neilston F.C.

== Public services ==
Neilston forms part of the Western water and sewerage regions of Scotland. Waste management is provided by the East Renfrewshire local authority. Water is supplied by Scottish Water, a government-owned corporation of the Scottish Government. Neilston's distribution network operator for electricity is Scottish Power. There are no hospitals in Neilston—the nearest are in the larger settlements of Paisley, Glasgow and Newton Mearns—but some local health care is provided by the Doctors Surgery in central Neilston. The NHS board is NHS Greater Glasgow and Clyde. Strathclyde Fire and Rescue is the statutory fire and rescue service which operates in Neilston. The nearest fire station is in Barrhead.

Policing in Neilston is provided by Police Scotland. The Strathclyde Partnership for Transport, a public body in Scotland, has direct operational responsibilities, such as supporting (and in some cases running) local bus services, and managing integrated ticketing in Neilston and other areas from the former Strathclyde region. Transport Scotland manages the local rail network.

== Notable people ==
People from Neilston are called Nulsoners. Gregor Fisher, acclaimed comedian who portrayed Rab C. Nesbitt, was raised by his aunt and uncle in Neilston. Shamus O'Brien was a Scottish American football striker born in Neilston in 1907. In his career in the United States, O'Brien spent eight seasons in the first American Soccer League and another five in the second American Soccer League. John Robertson who built the engine for the steamship PS Comet in 1811, was born in Neilston in 1782. A granite obelisk in his honour is erected opposite the parish church. The Stevenson family of lighthouse designers and civil engineers, which included Robert, Alan and Thomas, as well as Treasure Island writer Robert Louis Stevenson, came of a family that farmed land in Neilston parish.
