= List of Category A listed buildings in East Renfrewshire =

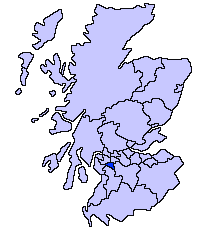
East Renfrewshire shown within Scotland

This is a list of Category A listed buildings in East Renfrewshire, Scotland.

In Scotland, the term listed building refers to a building or other structure officially designated as being of "special architectural or historic interest". Category A structures are those considered to be buildings of "national or international importance, either architecturally or historically". Listing was begun by a provision in the Town and Country Planning (Scotland) Act 1947, and the current legislative basis for listing is the Planning (Listed Buildings and Conservation Areas) (Scotland) Act 1997. The authority for listing rests with Historic Environment Scotland, an executive agency of the Scottish Government, which inherited this role from the Scottish Development Department in 1991. Once listed, severe restrictions are imposed on the modifications allowed to a building's structure or its fittings. Listed building consent must be obtained from local authorities prior to any alteration to such a structure. There are approximately 47,000 listed buildings in Scotland, of which around 8 percent (some 3,800) are Category A.

The council area of East Renfrewshire covers 513 square kilometres (198 sq mi), and has a population of around 89,000. The area contains five Category A listed buildings, comprising a 15th-century tower house, three 18th-century country houses, and a 19th-century water works.

== Listed buildings ==
Name	Location	Date listed	Geo-coordinates	Notes	LB number	Image
Caldwell House	Gleniffer Road, by Uplawmoor	14 April 1971	55°45′17″N 4°31′38″W	18th-century castellated house by Robert Adam	14255	Upload another image See more images
Capelrig House	Next to Eastwood High School, Capelrig Road, Newton Mearns	10 June 1971	55°47′12″N 4°19′36″W	Georgian country house, in use as council offices	18523	Upload another image See more images
Mearns Castle	Next to Mearns Castle High School, Waterfoot Road, Newton Mearns	10 June 1971	55°46′11″N 4°18′33″W	15th-century tower house, much restored and used by a local church	18536	Upload another image See more images
Greenbank House	In National Trust site at Greenbank Garden, Flenders Road, Clarkston	10 June 1971	55°46′54″N 4°17′45″W	Georgian country house, property of the National Trust for Scotland	18537	Upload another image See more images
Waulkmill Glen Reservoir	Dams to Darnley Country Park, between Newton Mearns and Barrhead	5 November 2008	55°47′30″N 4°21′28″W	Mid 19th-century reservoir and Italianate waterworks	51186	Upload another image See more images

== See also ==
- Scheduled monuments in East Renfrewshire
