= Mearns =

Mearns may refer to:

- Kincardineshire, a county in Scotland also known as the Mearns
  - Mearns Academy
  - Mearns FM
- Mearns, a parish in Renfrewshire, Scotland
  - Newton Mearns
  - Mearns Castle
  - Mearns Castle High School
  - Mearns Primary School
- Mearns, Somerset, England
- Mearns, Alberta, Canada
- Mearns (surname)

== See also ==
- Chihuahuan grasshopper mouse or Mearns's grasshopper mouse
- Máel Petair of Mearns
- Mearns's flying fox, a species of bat endemic to the Philippines
- Mearns's pouched mouse, a species of rodent in Ethiopia, Kenya, Somalia, Tanzania, and Uganda
- Mearns's squirrel, a species of squirrel native to Mexico
- Montezuma quail or Mearns quail
