= List of listed buildings in East Renfrewshire =

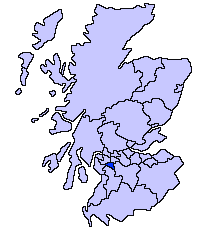
East Renfrewshire shown within Scotland

This is a list of listed buildings in East Renfrewshire. The list is split out by parish.

- List of listed buildings in Barrhead, East Renfrewshire
- List of listed buildings in Beith, East Renfrewshire
- List of listed buildings in Cathcart, East Renfrewshire
- List of listed buildings in Eaglesham, East Renfrewshire
- List of listed buildings in Eastwood, East Renfrewshire
- List of listed buildings in Mearns, East Renfrewshire
- List of listed buildings in Neilston, East Renfrewshire

== See also ==
- List of Category A listed buildings in East Renfrewshire
- Scheduled monuments in East Renfrewshire
