= Barrhead Burgh Hall =

Municipal Building in Barrhead, Scotland

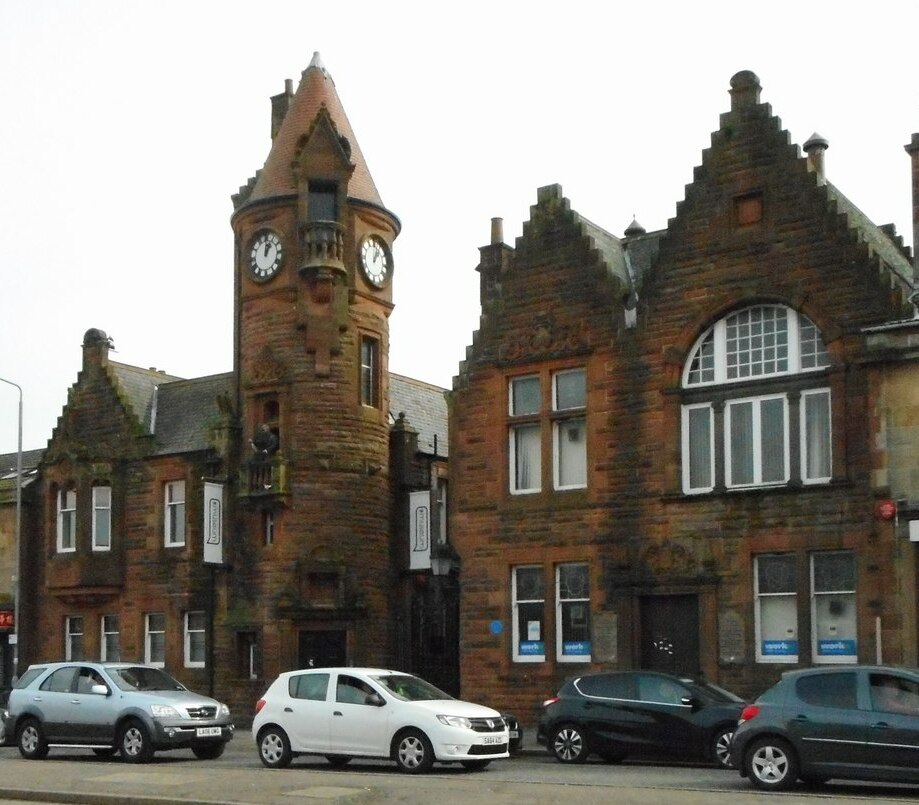
- The Burgh Court Hall (on the left) and the Burgh Chambers (on the right)

- Shown in East Renfrewshire
- 55.8002°N 4.3908°W
- Location: Main Street, Barrhead

History
- Built: 1904

Site notes
- Architect(s): Ninian MacWhannell and John Rogerson
- Architectural style: Renaissance style

Listed Building – Category C(S)
- Official name: 128 Main Street, Burgh Court Hall
- Designated: 27 June 1980
- Reference no.: LB22115

Listed Building – Category C(S)
- Official name: 124 Main Street, Burgh Chambers
- Designated: 27 April 2004
- Reference no.: LB49833

Barrhead Burgh Hall, also known as Barrhead Burgh Court Hall and Burgh Chambers and as the James McGuire Building, is a municipal complex in Main Street, Barrhead, East Renfrewshire, Scotland. The complex was the headquarters of Barrhead Burgh Council. It consists of two distinct buildings separated by an iron gate: Barrhead Burgh Court Hall, which is a Category C listed building, and, Barrhead Burgh Chambers, which is also a Category C listed building, although, as a group, they are listed at Category B.

== History ==
After significant population growth, largely associated with the manufacturing industries, Barrhead became a police burgh in 1894. In this context, the new civic leaders decided to procure municipal offices for the burgh: the site they selected in Main Street was owned by Zechariah John Heys who chose to donate it to the town. Heys was the town's second provost and the owner of the South Arthurlie Printworks.

Work started on the new complex in 1902. It was designed by Ninian MacWhannell and John Rogerson in the Renaissance style, built in rubble masonry by the local contracting firm, Houston and Young, and was officially opened on 15 April 1904.

The design of the burgh court hall involved an asymmetrical main frontage with three bays facing onto Main Street; the left hand bay featured an oriel window with a stepped gable above, while the right hand bay featured a circular tower with a doorway flanked by pilasters supporting an entablature on the ground floor: there was a rectangular balcony with a window in the next stage and a semi-circular balcony with a window flanked by clock faces in the final stage. The tower was surmounted by a conical roof. Internally the principal room in the building was the courtroom.

The design of the burgh chambers involved an asymmetrical main frontage with two bays facing onto Main Street; on the ground floor there was a central doorway flanked by pilasters supporting an entablature and a carved coat of arms. The right hand bay featured a Diocletian window on the first floor and both bays had stepped gables. Internally, the principal rooms in the building were the council chamber and the burgh treasurer's office.

The area was advanced to the status of small burgh with the burgh hall as its headquarters in 1930. The complex continued to serve as the headquarters of the burgh council for much of the 20th century, but ceased to be the local seat of government when the enlarged Renfrew District Council was formed in 1975. The complex continued to operate as the local police station until the police service relocated to Bank Street, but it was then brought back into use as a community centre, the Main Street Centre, in 1995. In its capacity as a community centre, the structure was renamed the James McGuire Building in March 1996. McGuire had been the provost of Barrhead and the owner of a local butchers' business. The complex then served as a work and employability centre until the centre moved to the Barrhead Foundry in January 2015. After remaining vacant for some five years, it was brought back into use as a community hub again in March 2020.

== See also ==
- List of listed buildings in Barrhead
