= List of listed buildings in Barrhead =

This is a list of listed buildings in the parish of Barrhead in East Renfrewshire, Scotland.

== List ==
Name	Location	Date Listed	Grid Ref. (Note: Sometimes known as OSGB36, the grid reference (where provided) is based on the British national grid reference system used by the Ordnance Survey. • "Guide to National Grid". Ordnance Survey. • "Get-a-map". Ordnance Survey.)	Geo-coordinates	Notes	LB Number (Note: Historic Environment Scotland assign a unique alphanumeric identifier to each designated site in Scotland, for listed buildings this always begins with "LB", for example "LB12345".)	Image
"The Trees", Now Fereneze Golf Clubhouse, Fereneze Ave				55°48′17″N 4°24′07″W	Category B	22122	Upload Photo
Darnley Road, Montford House, Including Boundary Walls, Gatepiers And Railings				55°48′18″N 4°22′24″W	Category B	49538	Upload Photo
Barrhead, 5 Arthurlie Avenue, Ferndean Including Gatepiers				55°47′52″N 4°23′26″W	Category C(S)	51578	Upload Photo
Salterland Road, Bridge At Salterland				55°48′45″N 4°22′30″W	Category C(S)	22123	Upload Photo
Masonic Temple, Cochrane Street				55°48′00″N 4°23′45″W	Category C(S)	22117	Upload Photo
Arthurlie House Community Centre, Springhill Road				55°47′40″N 4°23′46″W	Category B	22119	Upload another image See more images
Barrhead South Parish Church Main Street				55°48′01″N 4°23′23″W	Category B	22114	Upload Photo
128 Main Street, Burgh Court Hall				55°48′00″N 4°23′25″W	Category C(S)	22115	Upload another image
Bourock Parish Church, Main Street				55°47′59″N 4°23′42″W	Category B	22116	Upload another image
124 Main Street, Burgh Chambers				55°48′00″N 4°23′27″W	Category C(S)	49833	Upload Photo
Viaduct At Salterland				55°48′45″N 4°22′31″W	Category B	22124	Upload Photo
Chapell House, Gateside Road				55°47′59″N 4°24′19″W	Category B	22120	Upload Photo
Stable-Block Of Chapell House, Gateside Road				55°48′00″N 4°24′17″W	Category B	22121	Upload Photo

== Key ==
The scheme for classifying buildings in Scotland is:

- Category A: "buildings of national or international importance, either architectural or historic; or fine, little-altered examples of some particular period, style or building type."
- Category B: "buildings of regional or more than local importance; or major examples of some particular period, style or building type, which may have been altered."
- Category C: "buildings of local importance; lesser examples of any period, style, or building type, as originally constructed or moderately altered; and simple traditional buildings which group well with other listed buildings."

In March 2016 there were 47,288 listed buildings in Scotland. Of these, 8% were Category A, and 50% were Category B, with the remaining 42% being Category C.

== See also ==
- List of listed buildings in East Renfrewshire
