= List of listed buildings in Mearns, East Renfrewshire =

This is a list of listed buildings in the parish of Newton Mearns in East Renfrewshire, Scotland.

== List ==
| Name | Location | Date Listed | Grid Ref. (Note: Sometimes known as OSGB36, the grid reference (where provided) is based on the British national grid reference system used by the Ordnance Survey. • "Guide to National Grid". Ordnance Survey. • "Get-a-map". Ordnance Survey.) | Geo-coordinates | Notes | LB Number (Note: Historic Environment Scotland assign a unique alphanumeric identifier to each designated site in Scotland, for listed buildings this always begins with "LB", for example "LB12345".) | Image |
|---|---|---|---|---|---|---|---|
| Mearnskirk Hospital, Former Nurses' Home Administration Block Former Domestic Residence General Store House Lodge And Southfield House | | | | 55°45′47″N 4°19′59″W | Category B | 19215 | Upload Photo |
| Ayr Road, No 71 Newton Mearns | | | | 55°47′01″N 4°18′48″W | Category B | 18526 | Upload Photo |
| Aurs Road, Balgray Reservoir Draw-Off Tower | | | | 55°47′00″N 4°21′55″W | Category B | 51185 | Upload Photo |
| Robert Pollock Monument, At Junction Of Old Mearns Road With Ayr Road Near Loganswell | | | | 55°44′37″N 4°21′54″W | Category C(S) | 19889 | Upload another image See more images |
| Newton Mearns Broom Road East Kirkhill House | | | | 55°46′29″N 4°18′14″W | Category B | 18524 | Upload Photo |
| Ayr Road, Fa'side House | | | | 55°45′53″N 4°20′48″W | Category B | 18527 | Upload Photo |
| Church Of Maxwell, Mearns Castle, Broom Road, By Newton Mearns | | | | 55°46′11″N 4°18′33″W | Category A | 18536 | Upload another image |
| "Croyland", No. 202 Ayr Road, Newton Mearns | | | | 55°46′31″N 4°19′41″W | Category B | 18531 | Upload Photo |
| Balgray House, Off Stewarton Road (B769) | | | | 55°46′46″N 4°22′22″W | Category B | 18533 | Upload Photo |
| "Holytree" (Formerly "Todhill"), Capelrig Road By Newton Mearns | | | | 55°46′47″N 4°19′51″W | Category B | 18529 | Upload Photo |
| Humbie Road, Kirkhouse Newton Mearns | | | | 55°46′00″N 4°19′21″W | Category B | 18534 | Upload Photo |
| Ayr Road, Gates And Gatepiers At No 71. Newton Mearns | | | | 55°47′01″N 4°18′48″W | Category C(S) | 18525 | Upload Photo |
| Capelrig, Capelrig Road, By Newton Mearns | | | | 55°47′12″N 4°19′36″W | Category A | 18523 | Upload Photo |
| Belmont House School, Formerly "Broom House", Sandringham Avenue, Newton Mearns | | | | 55°46′53″N 4°18′48″W | Category B | 18528 | Upload Photo |
| Mearns Kirk, Mearnskirk Newton Mearns | | | | 55°46′01″N 4°19′30″W | Category B | 18532 | Upload another image See more images |

== Key ==
The scheme for classifying buildings in Scotland is:

- Category A: "buildings of national or international importance, either architectural or historic; or fine, little-altered examples of some particular period, style or building type."
- Category B: "buildings of regional or more than local importance; or major examples of some particular period, style or building type, which may have been altered."
- Category C: "buildings of local importance; lesser examples of any period, style, or building type, as originally constructed or moderately altered; and simple traditional buildings which group well with other listed buildings."

In March 2016 there were 47,288 listed buildings in Scotland. Of these, 8% were Category A, and 50% were Category B, with the remaining 42% being Category C.

== See also ==
- List of listed buildings in East Renfrewshire
