= Edward Arthur Walton =

Scottish painter (1860–1922)

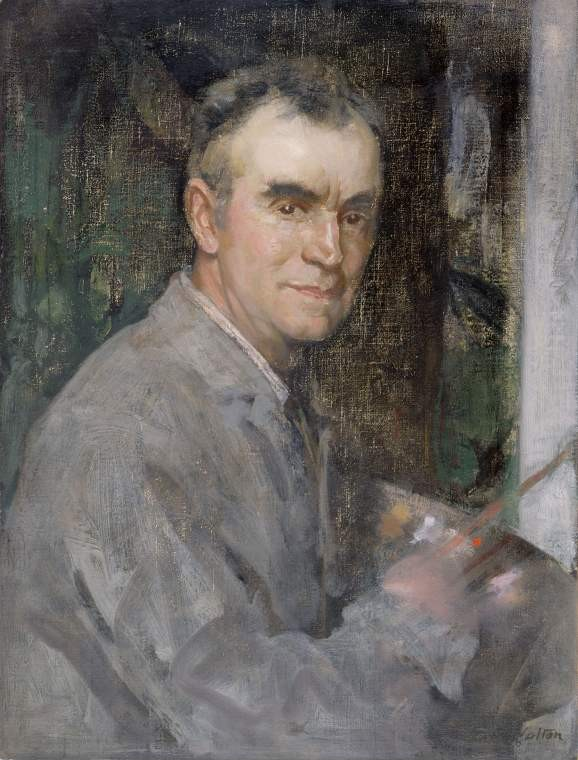
Self-portrait

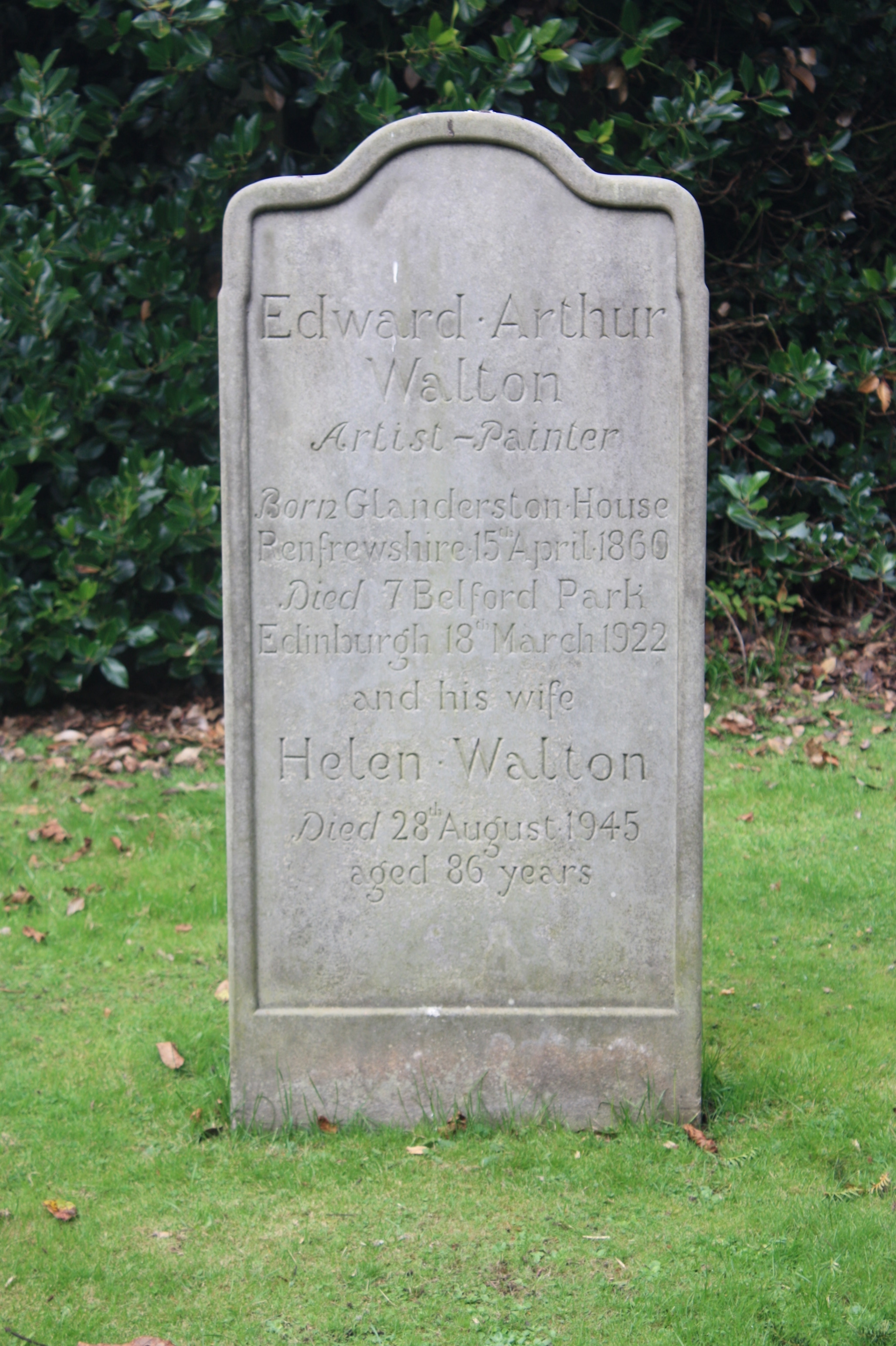
The grave of Edward Arthur Walton, Dean Cemetery

Edward Arthur Walton RI (15 April 1860 in Glanderston House, Barrhead, Renfrewshire – 18 March 1922 in Edinburgh) was a Scottish painter of landscapes and portraits, associated with the Düsseldorf school of painting.

== Life ==
Edward was one of twelve children of Jackson Walton, a Manchester commission agent and a competent painter and photographer. Some of Edward's siblings were well known in their time - his brother George Henry Walton (1867–1933) was a noted architect, furniture designer and stained glass designer, Constance Walton was an acclaimed botanical painter, while Helen Walton, born 1850, was a decorative artist who studied at the Glasgow Government School of Design and was artistic mentor to the family.

Walton enjoyed his art training at the Kunstakademie Düsseldorf and then at the Glasgow School of Art. He was a close friend of Joseph Crawhall – Walton’s brother Richard having married Judith Crawhall in 1878 – George Henry and James Guthrie and lived in Glasgow until 1894 where he became part of the Glasgow School or Glasgow Boys, all of whom were great admirers of Whistler. Their favourite painting haunts were in the Trossachs and at Crowland in Lincolnshire. In 1883 Walton joined Guthrie, who had taken a house in the Berwickshire village of Cockburnspath. He also produced a remarkable set of watercolours in Helensburgh in 1883, showing the affluent suburb and its decorous people. These images are regarded as some of the finest of the Glasgow School and praised for their clarity, colour and strong decorative sense. Carrying out portrait commissions became Walton's main source of income. In the 1880s and 1890s he painted murals in the main building of the Glasgow International Exhibition of 1888 and other buildings in the city. dw

In 1889 Walton appeared at the Glasgow Art Club Fancy Dress Ball as Hokusai which coincided with an exhibition of Hokusai's (Walton's) Japanese prints at the gallery of Alexander Reid at 124 St Vincent Street. At the same event Walton announced his engagement to Helen Law, an artist's model known as "Butterfly" by James Whistler.

Walton also attended painting classes at the Glasgow studio of W. Y. Macgregor, one of the central figures of the Glasgow School. Walton exhibited from 1880 in both Glasgow, at the Royal Glasgow Institute of Fine Arts, and Edinburgh, at the Royal Scottish Academy, being elected an associate of the Academy in 1889 and a full member in 1905. He was in London from 1894 until 1904, living in Cheyne Walk in Chelsea, and a neighbour of Whistler and John Lavery. While in London, Walton often painted in Suffolk, spending summers at the Old Vicarage in Wenhaston. Here he painted pastoral scenes in oil and watercolour, the latter often on buff paper with creative interplay between paper and paint. He used extensive underpainting in his oils, thereby creating subtle effects.

In 1907 he accompanied Guthrie on a painting trip to Algiers and Spain and in 1913 worked in Belgium. The World War I years led to his discovering Galloway and he became a frequent visitor to the area.

From 1915 he served as President of the Royal Scottish Water Colour Society. Walton's use of oil was reserved largely for important portraits in the Whistlerian manner.

Walton married the artist Helen Law (née Henderson) after becoming engaged on 29 November 1889. Helen gave up her painting career in order to tend to their family. Their son John (1895–1971), became Regius Professor of Botany at the University of Glasgow. Their daughter Cecile (1891–1956), was a successful painter, sculptor and illustrator in Edinburgh. Their youngest daughter Margery married William Oliphant Hutchison in 1918.

A member of Glasgow Art Club work by Walton was included in the club's Memorial Exhibition of 1935, in memory of those of its members who had died since the First World War.

He died at 7 Belford Park in Edinburgh and is buried in Dean Cemetery in Edinburgh, near the north-east corner of the northern Victorian section.

== Family ==
Walton was married to Helen Law and they had a sons and two daughters. Their children included the botanist John Walton FRSE (1895–1971) who he portrayed at least once.

== Gallery ==
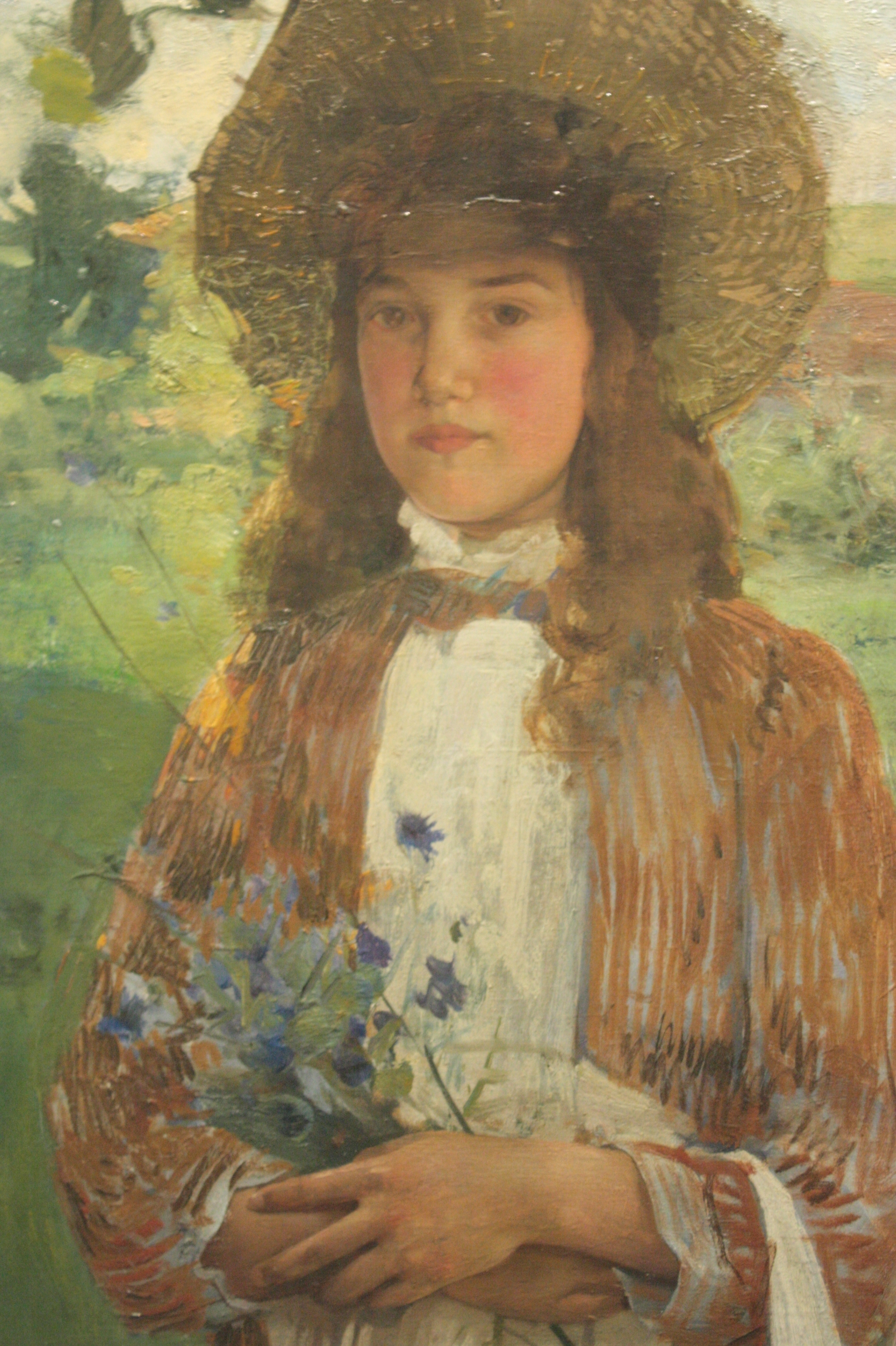
Bluette by Edward Arthur Walton, 1891, National Gallery of Scotland

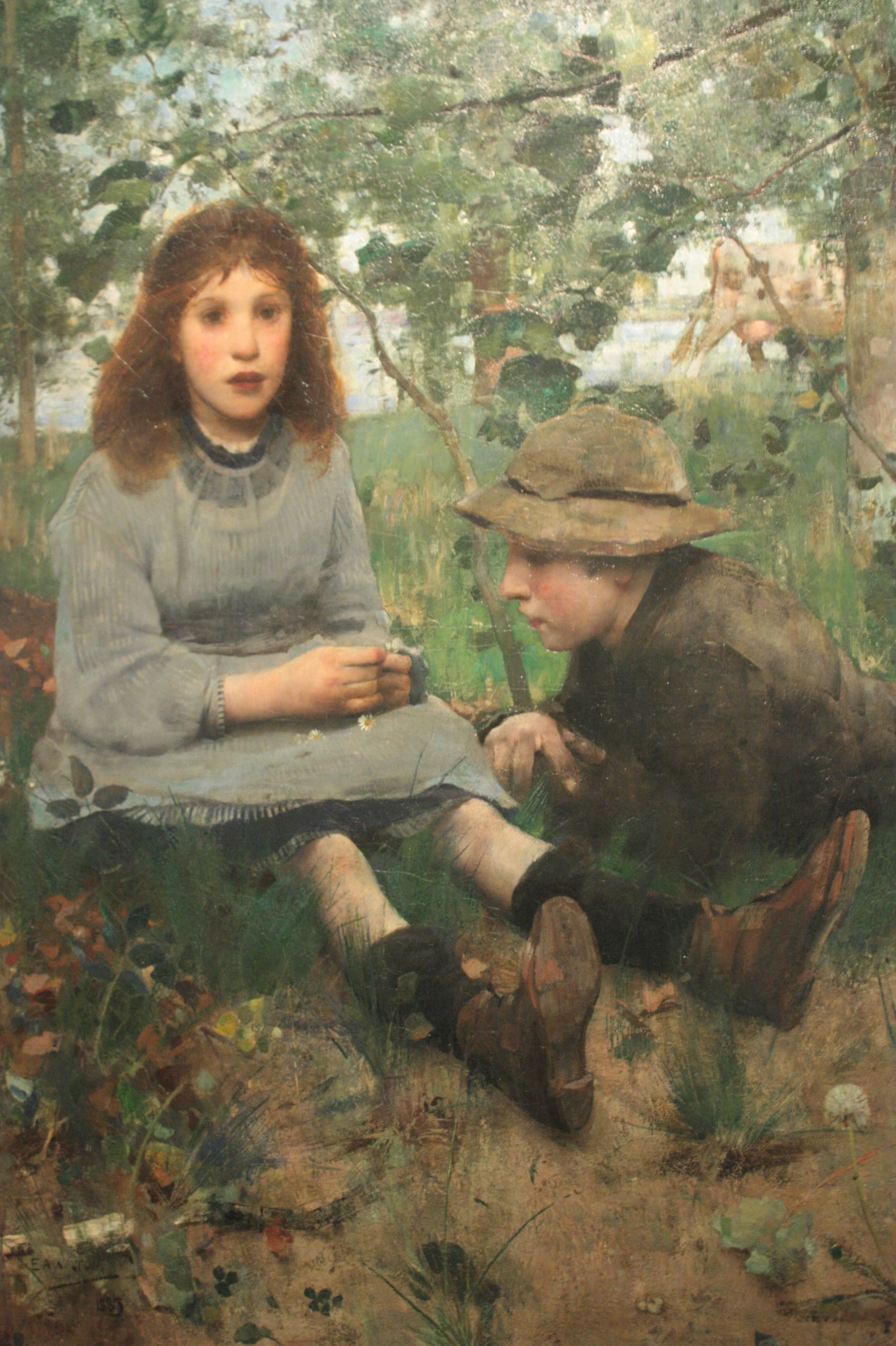
A Daydream by Edward Arthur Walton, 1885, National Gallery of Scotland

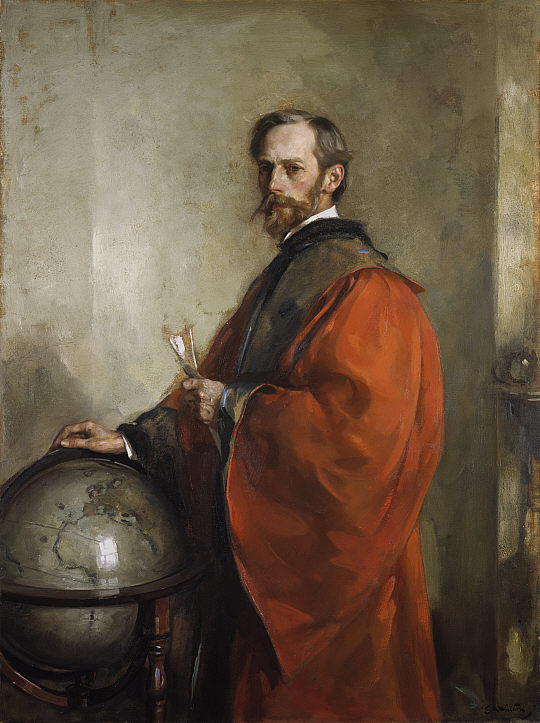
John George Bartholomew (cartographer)
by Edward Arthur Walton (1911)

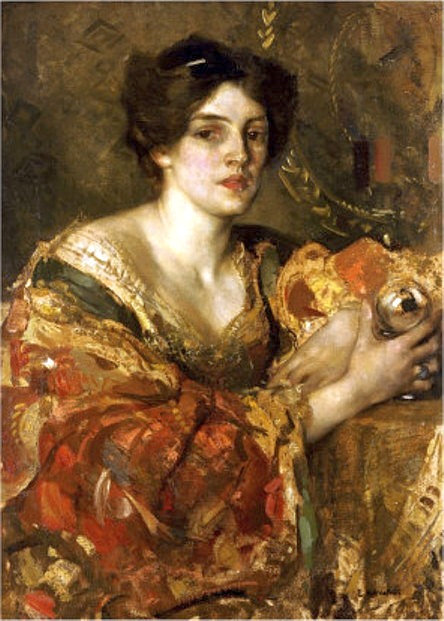
Miss Jane Aitken

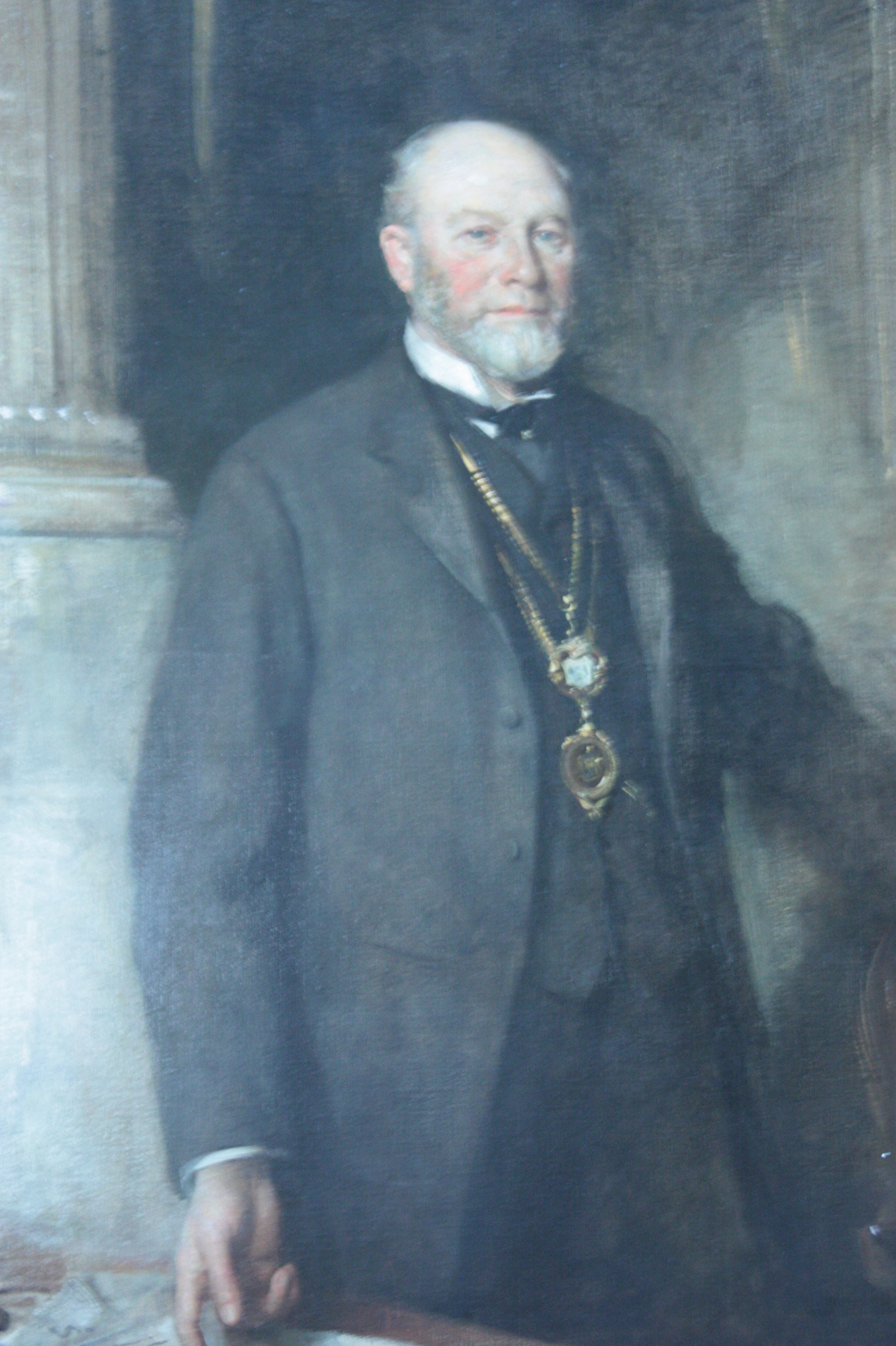
James Laidlaw Ewing, Master of the Merchant Company in Edinburgh, c.1910

== Bibliography ==
- Edward Arthur Walton - Fiona MacSporran, Glasgow, 1987.
