= Belmont House School =

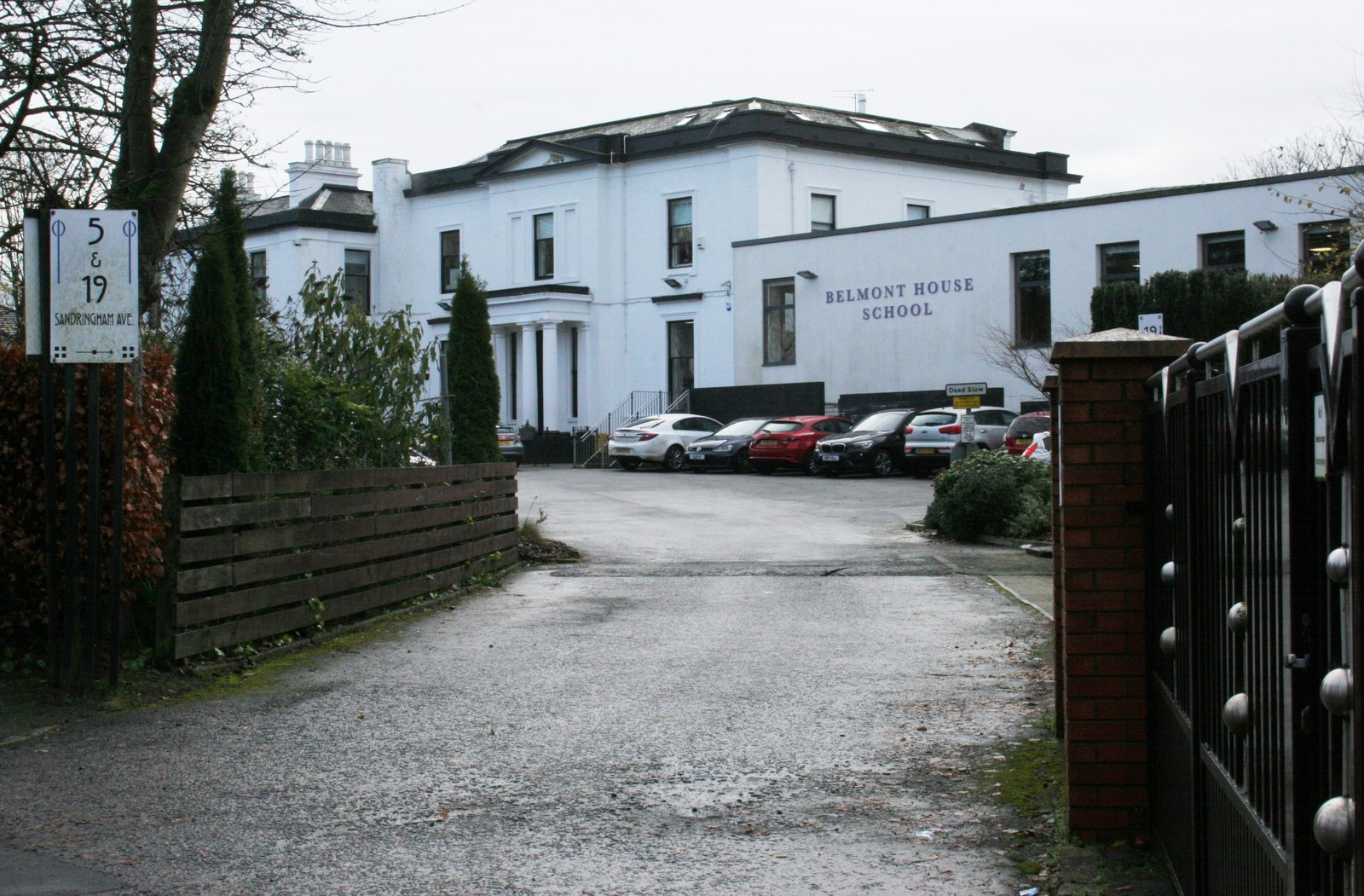

Location
- Sandringham Avenue, Broom; Newton Mearns, G77 5DU; Scotland

Information
- Type: Private school
- Motto: Strenue sed aeque strong but fair
- Established: 1929
- Principal: Melvyn Shanks
- Staff: 55
- Gender: Mixed
- Age: 3 to 18
- Enrolment: 300
- School Years: Nursery - S6
- Website: http://www.belmontschool.co.uk/home

Belmont House School is a private co-educational school in Newton Mearns, East Renfrewshire, Scotland, in the greater Glasgow area, providing primary and secondary education. It is based in the former Broom House, a Georgian category B listed building.

== History ==
The school was founded in 1929 in Greenhill Avenue, Giffnock as a boys' preparatory school, and moved to its current home in the former mansion house of the Broom Estate in 1934. The Broom House was built in 1840, possibly to a design by David Hamilton, and was the birthplace of Margaret Campbell, Duchess of Argyll. In 1977, the secondary department opened, and the school began admitting female pupils in 2000.

== Junior school ==
The school was originally established as a preparatory (or primary) school. Today, pupils sit the cycling proficiency test and a programme of Emergency First Aid in Primary 6.
