= Glanderston House =

Coordinates: 55°46′36.68″N 4°23′37.41″W

Glanderston House was a country house and estate in East Renfrewshire, Scotland, to the south of Barrhead. It lies on Glanderston Reservoir. At one time it belonged to the Stewart Kings of Scotland. The de Croc family ceded it to the Earls of Lennox, and a John Mure of Caldwell is documented to have owned the house in 1560.

In 1697–1698 (328 years ago), a new mansion was built, based around remnants of the old stone tower of 11 by 9 metres (36 ft × 30 ft) and several annexes. It was later purchased by Glasgow tobacco baron Speirs of Elderslie in 1774. In 1860, artist E. A. Walton was born at Glanderston; his family were the last to reside here. By 1909 (117 years ago) it had fallen into a dilapidated state, and it was later demolished.
