= List of listed buildings in Eastwood, East Renfrewshire =

This is a list of listed buildings in the parish of Eastwood in East Renfrewshire, Scotland.

== List ==
| Name | Location | Date Listed | Grid Ref. (Note: Sometimes known as OSGB36, the grid reference (where provided) is based on the British national grid reference system used by the Ordnance Survey. • "Guide to National Grid". Ordnance Survey. • "Get-a-map". Ordnance Survey.) | Geo-coordinates | Notes | LB Number (Note: Historic Environment Scotland assign a unique alphanumeric identifier to each designated site in Scotland, for listed buildings this always begins with "LB", for example "LB12345".) | Image |
|---|---|---|---|---|---|---|---|
| Rhuallan House, 1 Montgomery Drive, Giffnock | | | | 55°47′53″N 4°17′48″W | Category B | 5121 | Upload Photo |
| Clarkston Road Maclaren Place | | | | 55°48′09″N 4°16′12″W | Category B | 5126 | Upload Photo |
| Giffnock, 192-210 (Even Nos) Fenwick Road, Maverton Buildings | | | | 55°48′06″N 4°17′44″W | Category C(S) | 5133 | Upload Photo |
| Orchardhill Church Of Scotland, Church Road, Giffnock | | | | 55°48′01″N 4°17′36″W | Category B | 5123 | Upload Photo |
| Unitas Building, 2-12 Main Street, Thornliebank | | | | 55°48′21″N 4°19′07″W | Category C(S) | 87 | Upload Photo |
| Aurs Road, Main House Including Workshops And Former Water Testing Tower | | | | 55°47′40″N 4°21′26″W | Category C(S) | 51184 | Upload Photo |
| Giffnock South Church Of Scotland, Greenhill Avenue, Giffnock | | | | 55°47′44″N 4°18′01″W | Category B | 5125 | Upload another image See more images |
| "Eastwood Park" Rouken Glen Road, Giffnock | | | | 55°47′55″N 4°18′23″W | Category C(S) | 5128 | Upload Photo |
| Alexander Crum Memorial Library, Speirsbridge Road, Thornliebank | | | | 55°48′19″N 4°19′07″W | Category B | 5131 | Upload Photo |
| 4 Park Road/Fenwick Road, Orchard Park Hotel | | | | 55°48′08″N 4°17′44″W | Category C(S) | 5122 | Upload Photo |
| 43 Ayr Road, Whitecraigs House, Including Terraces And Staircase, Perimeter Wall And Gatepiers | | | | 55°47′19″N 4°18′29″W | Category B | 6625 | Upload Photo |
| Thornliebank Public School, Main Street, Thornliebank | | | | 55°48′34″N 4°18′51″W | Category B | 5129 | Upload another image |
| 2 And 4 Mains Avenue, Giffnock | | | | 55°47′46″N 4°18′02″W | Category C(S) | 47276 | Upload Photo |
| Thornliebank (Woodlands) Parish Church | | | | 55°48′11″N 4°19′08″W | Category C(S) | 5130 | Upload Photo |
| Eastwood Toll, Lodge House And Gatepiers At Eastwood Park | | | | 55°47′48″N 4°18′09″W | Category B | 5132 | Upload Photo |
| "Old Mains", Cadzow Avenue, Giffnock | | | | 55°47′35″N 4°17′55″W | Category B | 5124 | Upload Photo |
| "Eastwoodhill" 238 Fenwick Road, Giffnock | | | | 55°47′51″N 4°17′59″W | Category B | 5127 | Upload Photo |

== Key ==
The scheme for classifying buildings in Scotland is:

- Category A: "buildings of national or international importance, either architectural or historic; or fine, little-altered examples of some particular period, style or building type."
- Category B: "buildings of regional or more than local importance; or major examples of some particular period, style or building type, which may have been altered."
- Category C: "buildings of local importance; lesser examples of any period, style, or building type, as originally constructed or moderately altered; and simple traditional buildings which group well with other listed buildings."

In March 2016 there were 47,288 listed buildings in Scotland. Of these, 8% were Category A, and 50% were Category B, with the remaining 42% being Category C.

== See also ==
- List of listed buildings in East Renfrewshire
