= Capelrig House =

Building in East Renfrewshire, Scotland

Coordinates: 55.786729°N 4.326631°W

Capelrig House is an 18th-century house in Newton Mearns, East Renfrewshire, Scotland, upon whose lands is situated Eastwood High School. The house is protected as a Category A listed building.

The lands of Capelrig were held by the Knights Templar in the 12th century. Upon the suppression of the Templars, their property passed to the Knights Hospitaller. At the time of the Scottish Reformation, the Hospitallers' lands were surrendered to the Crown, but were returned by Mary, Queen of Scots to Sir James Sandilands, the last preceptor of the Hospitallers in Scotland.

Capelrig was later acquired by the Mure family of Caldwell. The Mures sided with the Covenanters during the religious conflicts of the 17th century, and Capelrig was briefly taken by the Royalist General Tam Dalyell of the Binns. The family regained their lands upon the Glorious Revolution of 1688.

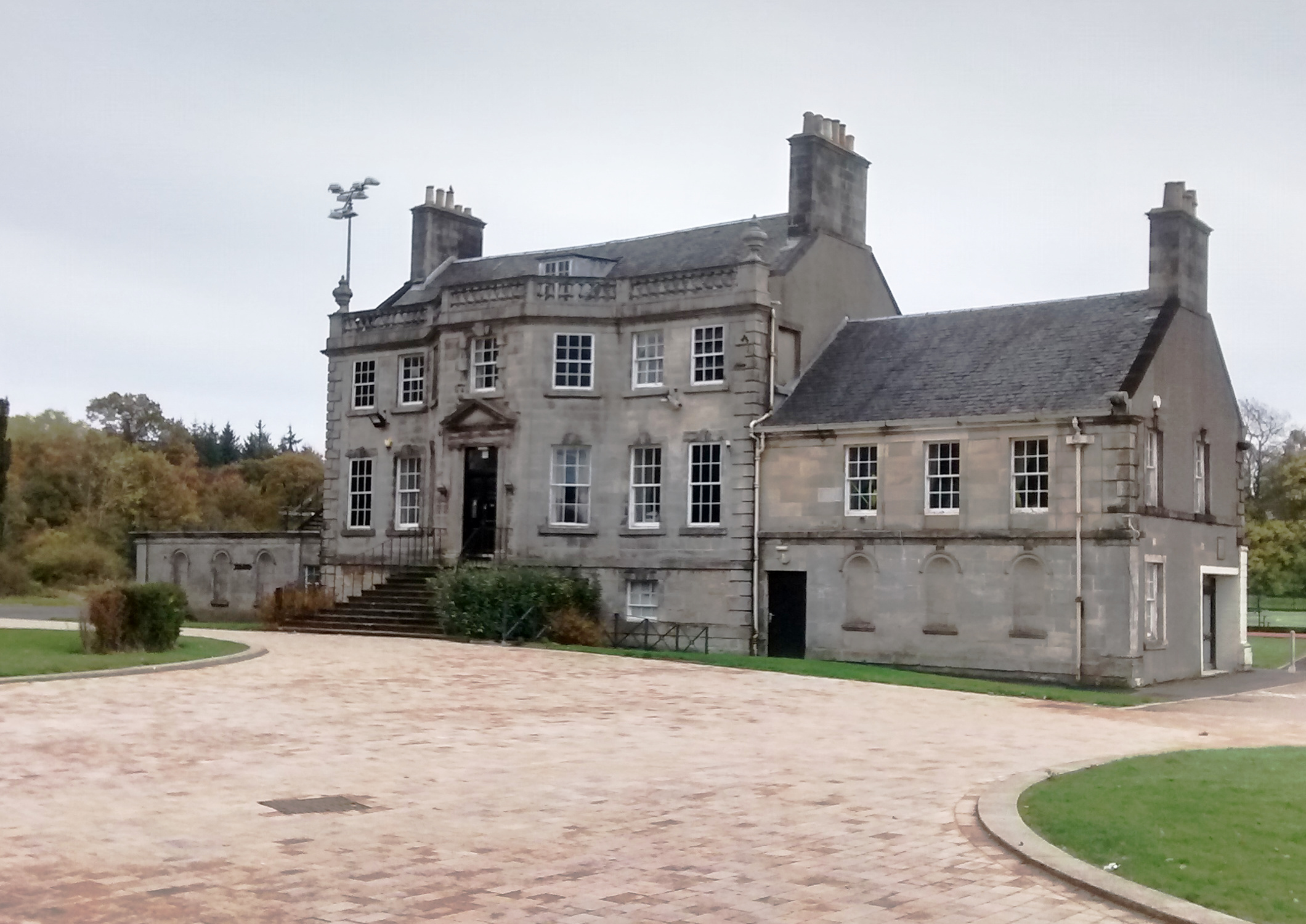
Capelrig House

In 1765 Capelrig Estate was bought by Robert Barclay, whose mentor was William Mure and who gave him a lucrative post as a tax collector, becoming Depute Admiral of the Clyde. Barclay was regarded as the best whist player in Glasgow in his day and was a lawyer in the city in the firm of Barclay & Grahame. In 1769 a new house was erected, the present house in the Georgian style. It and the Estate descended through his family to James Barclay Murdoch, noted historian and antiquarian - and himself a descendant of the Browns and of the Murdochs who were Provosts of Glasgow. A wing was added to the south-west in 1913 by its new owner Kenneth Weir, on the occasion of his marriage. He later became the 2nd Viscount Weir of Eastwood. Much of the Estate continued to be owned by the Murdoch Trust families.

In 1948 Kenneth Weir sold the House and farmlands to John Lawrence & Co Ltd, housebuilders, To provide for a new school Capelrig House and its immediate policies were purchased by the then Council of County of Renfrew who wished to demolish the building but were dissuaded after a public outcry. It was refurbished as an arts centre, and has been used as offices by East Renfrewshire Council.
