= List of listed buildings in Uplawmoor =

This is a list of listed buildings in the parish of Uplawmoor in East Renfrewshire, Scotland.

== List ==
Name	Location	Date listed	Grid ref. (Note: Sometimes known as OSGB36, the grid reference (where provided) is based on the British national grid reference system used by the Ordnance Survey. • "Guide to National Grid". Ordnance Survey. • "Get-a-map". Ordnance Survey.)	Geo-coordinates	Notes	LB number (Note: Historic Environment Scotland assign a unique alphanumeric identifier to each designated site in Scotland, for listed buildings this always begins with "LB", for example "LB12345".)	Image
Gleniffer Road, Caldwell Estate, Former Keeper's House				55°45′01″N 4°31′59″W	Category B	49695	Upload Photo
Gleniffer Road, Caldwell Estate, Water Pump				55°45′24″N 4°31′31″W	Category B	49697	Upload Photo
Gleniffer Road, Caldwell Estate, Ram's Head Cottage Walled Garden				55°45′28″N 4°31′25″W	Category C(S)	49696	Upload Photo
Gleniffer Road, Caldwell House				55°45′17″N 4°31′38″W	Category A	14255	Upload another image

== Key ==
The scheme for classifying buildings in Scotland is:

- Category A: "buildings of national or international importance, either architectural or historic; or fine, little-altered examples of some particular period, style or building type."
- Category B: "buildings of regional or more than local importance; or major examples of some particular period, style or building type, which may have been altered."
- Category C: "buildings of local importance; lesser examples of any period, style, or building type, as originally constructed or moderately altered; and simple traditional buildings which group well with other listed buildings."

In March 2016 there were 47,288 listed buildings in Scotland. Of these, 8% were Category A, and 50% were Category B, with the remaining 42% being Category C.

== See also ==
- List of listed buildings in East Renfrewshire
