= List of listed buildings in Neilston =

This is a list of listed buildings in the parish of Neilston in East Renfrewshire, Scotland.

== List ==
Name	Location	Date Listed	Grid Ref. (Note: Sometimes known as OSGB36, the grid reference (where provided) is based on the British national grid reference system used by the Ordnance Survey. • "Guide to National Grid". Ordnance Survey. • "Get-a-map". Ordnance Survey.)	Geo-coordinates	Notes	LB Number (Note: Historic Environment Scotland assign a unique alphanumeric identifier to each designated site in Scotland, for listed buildings this always begins with "LB", for example "LB12345".)	Image
Snypes, By Snypes Dam, Neilston				55°45′57″N 4°25′19″W	Category C(S)	18682	Upload Photo
Lyoncross By Auchenback, Barrhead				55°47′31″N 4°22′07″W	Category C(S)	18683	Upload Photo
Hall Of Caldwell Uplawmoor				55°45′46″N 4°31′45″W	Category B	18685	Upload Photo
Crofthead Mill, Neilston				55°47′08″N 4°26′10″W	Category B	18959	Upload Photo
Tower Of The Place Of Caldwell, By Old Barn Farm, Caldwell				55°45′49″N 4°30′58″W	Category B	18684	Upload Photo
Uplawmoor, Neilston Road, Old School Hall Including Boundary Walls And Gatepiers				55°45′55″N 4°29′44″W	Category B	48118	Upload Photo
Neilston Parish Church, Main Street, Neilston				55°47′08″N 4°25′31″W	Category B	18699	Upload Photo
Waulkmill Glen Reservoir Including Draw-Off Tower, Self-Activating Sluice And Regulating House				55°47′30″N 4°21′28″W	Category A	51186	Upload Photo
Wraes Mill				55°47′26″N 4°24′36″W	Category C(S)	19899	Upload Photo
Nether Kirkton House, Neilston Road, Neilston				55°47′15″N 4°25′08″W	Category B	19902	Upload Photo

== Key ==
The scheme for classifying buildings in Scotland is:

- Category A: "buildings of national or international importance, either architectural or historic; or fine, little-altered examples of some particular period, style or building type."
- Category B: "buildings of regional or more than local importance; or major examples of some particular period, style or building type, which may have been altered."
- Category C: "buildings of local importance; lesser examples of any period, style, or building type, as originally constructed or moderately altered; and simple traditional buildings which group well with other listed buildings."

In March 2016 there were 47,288 listed buildings in Scotland. Of these, 8% were Category A, and 50% were Category B, with the remaining 42% being Category C.

== See also ==
- List of listed buildings in East Renfrewshire
