= List of listed buildings in Cathcart =

This is a list of listed buildings in the civil parish of Cathcart, Scotland. Although parishes ceased to be used for administrative purposes in 1930, Historic Scotland continue to use them and burghs for the purposes of geographically categorising listed buildings. The parish includes areas that were historically split between the counties of Renfrew and Lanark, and are today in the council areas of Glasgow and East Renfrewshire. However, as Historic Scotland categorise buildings within former burgh boundaries under that location rather than their parish, this list only covers the portion of Cathcart parish that was not within the Glasgow burgh boundary.

== List ==
| Name | Location | Date listed | Grid ref. (Note: Sometimes known as OSGB36, the grid reference (where provided) is based on the British national grid reference system used by the Ordnance Survey. • "Guide to National Grid". Ordnance Survey. • "Get-a-map". Ordnance Survey.) | Geo-coordinates | Notes | LB number (Note: Historic Environment Scotland assign a unique alphanumeric identifier to each designated site in Scotland, for listed buildings this always begins with "LB", for example "LB12345".) | Image |
|---|---|---|---|---|---|---|---|
| Netherlee Parish Church Ormonde Avenue | | | | 55°48′11″N 4°16′19″W | Category B | 5166 | Upload Photo |

== Key ==
The scheme for classifying buildings in Scotland is:

- Category A: "buildings of national or international importance, either architectural or historic; or fine, little-altered examples of some particular period, style or building type."
- Category B: "buildings of regional or more than local importance; or major examples of some particular period, style or building type, which may have been altered."
- Category C: "buildings of local importance; lesser examples of any period, style, or building type, as originally constructed or moderately altered; and simple traditional buildings which group well with other listed buildings."

In March 2016 there were 47,288 listed buildings in Scotland. Of these, 8% were Category A, and 50% were Category B, with the remaining 42% being Category C.

== See also ==
- List of listed buildings in East Renfrewshire
- List of listed buildings in Glasgow for buildings in the Glasgow burgh part of Cathcart parish
