= List of listed buildings in Eaglesham =

This is a list of listed buildings in the parish of Eaglesham in East Renfrewshire, Scotland.

== List ==
Name	Location	Date Listed	Grid Ref. (Note: Sometimes known as OSGB36, the grid reference (where provided) is based on the British national grid reference system used by the Ordnance Survey. • "Guide to National Grid". Ordnance Survey. • "Get-a-map". Ordnance Survey.)	Geo-coordinates	Notes	LB Number (Note: Historic Environment Scotland assign a unique alphanumeric identifier to each designated site in Scotland, for listed buildings this always begins with "LB", for example "LB12345".)	Image
25 (Two Houses) 26, 27 Polnoon Street				55°44′21″N 4°16′46″W	Category B	5217	Upload Photo
1 And 2 Cheapside Street				55°44′24″N 4°16′20″W	Category B	5235	Upload Photo
3 Cheapside Street				55°44′25″N 4°16′18″W	Category B	5236	Upload Photo
21 And 22 Montgomery Street				55°44′20″N 4°16′30″W	Category B	5239	Upload Photo
50, 51, And 'The Hobby Horse' 52, 53 Montgomery Street				55°44′16″N 4°16′40″W	Category B	5243	Upload Photo
64 Montgomery Street				55°44′15″N 4°16′44″W	Category B	5245	Upload Photo
10 Polnoon Street				55°44′26″N 4°16′35″W	Category B	5257	Upload Photo
17 Polnoon Street				55°44′24″N 4°16′39″W	Category B	5263	Upload Photo
19 Polnoon Street				55°44′24″N 4°16′41″W	Category B	5264	Upload Photo
16, 17, 18, 19 Montgomery Street				55°44′21″N 4°16′29″W	Category B	5269	Upload Photo
'Pillar House' 20 Montgomery Street				55°44′20″N 4°16′30″W	Category B	5270	Upload Photo
21 & 22 Polnoon Street				55°44′23″N 4°16′43″W	Category B	5215	Upload Photo
'swan Inn', 23 And 'La Petite', 24 Polnoon Street				55°44′22″N 4°16′43″W	Category B	5216	Upload Photo
'Coney Craig' 38 Polnoon Street				55°44′17″N 4°16′54″W	Category C(S)	5221	Upload Photo
35-39 And 41-45 Montgomery Street				55°44′18″N 4°16′36″W	Category B	5242	Upload Photo
68 Montgomery Street				55°44′14″N 4°16′46″W	Category B	5247	Upload Photo
11 Polnoon Street				55°44′26″N 4°16′35″W	Category B	5258	Upload Photo
9 And 'Pandora', 10 Cheapside Street				55°44′26″N 4°16′14″W	Category B	57	Upload Photo
'Woodend Cottage' 29 And 30 (Three Houses) Polnoon Street				55°44′20″N 4°16′48″W	Category B	5218	Upload Photo
'Hillhead' 46 & 47, 47A Polnoon Street				55°44′14″N 4°16′59″W	Category B	5223	Upload Photo
7A Montgomery Square				55°44′20″N 4°16′23″W	Category C(S)	5231	Upload Photo
'Woodview', 66 And "Holmlea', 67 Montgomery Street				55°44′15″N 4°16′45″W	Category B	5246	Upload Photo
'The Treasure Chest' 73; Victoria House, 74; 75 Montgomery Street				55°44′14″N 4°16′49″W	Category B	5249	Upload Photo
'Westbank' Cottage 84, And 'Ashlea' House' 85, Montgomery Street				55°44′13″N 4°16′51″W	Category B	5251	Upload Photo
'Linn Cottage', Montgomery Street				55°44′14″N 4°16′51″W	Category C(S)	5253	Upload Photo
13 And 14 Polnoon Street				55°44′25″N 4°16′37″W	Category B	5261	Upload Photo
15(West Part, A Cowan) And 'The Village Forge' 16 Polnoon Street				55°44′25″N 4°16′38″W	Category B	5262	Upload Photo
11-12 & 14 Montgomery Street				55°44′21″N 4°16′28″W	Category B	5268	Upload Photo
1 And 2 Polnoon Street And 73 And 75 Gilmour Street				55°44′29″N 4°16′30″W	Category B	58	Upload Photo
32 (Two Houses Including" Ivy Cottage" ), 33 (One House) And 34 (Two Houses) Polnoon Street				55°44′19″N 4°16′50″W	Category B	5220	Upload Photo
'Helenvale' 2 Montgomery Square				55°44′21″N 4°16′19″W	Category C(S)	5230	Upload Photo
'seaforth Cottage' 7 And 'Park View' 8, Cheapside Street				55°44′26″N 4°16′16″W	Category B	5238	Upload Photo
61, 62 And 'The Wishing Well', 63 Montgomery Street				55°44′15″N 4°16′43″W	Category B	5244	Upload Photo
70, 72 Montgomery Street				55°44′14″N 4°16′47″W	Category B	5248	Upload Photo
5 And 'six Fathoms', 6 Polnoon Street				55°44′28″N 4°16′33″W	Category B	5256	Upload Photo
St Bridget's Rc Church Polnoon Street To Rear Of 'Mayfield House'				55°44′26″N 4°16′36″W	Category C(S)	5260	Upload Photo
Cross Keys Inn, 1 Montgomery Street And "Cross Keys Cottage" Montgomery Square				55°44′21″N 4°16′26″W	Category B	5266	Upload Photo
11 & 12 Cheapside Street And Outbuilding Of No 12				55°44′27″N 4°16′13″W	Category B	5205	Upload Photo
Toft Kennels				55°45′03″N 4°17′43″W	Category C(S)	5213	Upload Photo
'Quarry House' At Quarry Lane				55°44′20″N 4°16′51″W	Category C(S)	5219	Upload Photo
Old School House, Gilmour Street				55°44′24″N 4°16′23″W	Category B	5227	Upload Photo
35; 37, 39; 41, 43 (Formerly 5, 4, 3) Gilmour Street				55°44′22″N 4°16′19″W	Category C(S)	5228	Upload Photo
'Kirkstyle' Off Gilmour Street				55°44′22″N 4°16′22″W	Category C(S)	5229	Upload Photo
'Cheapside House' 6 Cheapside Street				55°44′25″N 4°16′16″W	Category B	5237	Upload Photo
26, And 29, 30 Montgomery Street				55°44′20″N 4°16′31″W	Category B	5240	Upload Photo
'Lynn View' 77 Montgomery Street				55°44′13″N 4°16′50″W	Category B	5250	Upload Photo
3 Polnoon Street				55°44′28″N 4°16′31″W	Category B	5255	Upload Photo
'Mayfield House' 12 Polnoon Street				55°44′26″N 4°16′36″W	Category B	5259	Upload Photo
2-7 Montgomery Street				55°44′21″N 4°16′27″W	Category B	5267	Upload Photo
Eaglesham Old & Carswell Manse Cheapside Street				55°44′27″N 4°16′06″W	Category B	5207	Upload Photo
Mid Bridge Over Eaglesham Burn, The Common				55°44′22″N 4°16′34″W	Category C(S)	5208	Upload Photo
Millhall: House, Cottages And Stable				55°44′00″N 4°15′25″W	Category B	5210	Upload Photo
Low Borland				55°45′02″N 4°16′44″W	Category C(S)	55	Upload Photo
'Janefield House' 20 Polnoon Street				55°44′23″N 4°16′42″W	Category B	5214	Upload Photo
'Ross Cottage' 50 Polnoon Street				55°44′14″N 4°17′01″W	Category C(S)	5224	Upload Photo
Eaglesham Old And Carswell Church And Session House, Montgomery Street				55°44′22″N 4°16′24″W	Category B	5265	Upload Photo
Humbie Bridge Over Earn Water				55°45′39″N 4°18′48″W	Category B	5209	Upload Photo
51 Polnoon Street				55°44′13″N 4°17′02″W	Category C(S)	5225	Upload Photo
No. 4 Montgomery Square,				55°44′21″N 4°16′21″W	Category C(S)	5233	Upload Photo
8 Montgomery Square				55°44′20″N 4°16′24″W	Category B	5234	Upload Photo
'Mansfield House', 32 & 33 Montgomery Street				55°44′19″N 4°16′33″W	Category B	5241	Upload Photo
'Linton Cottage' 35 Polnoon Street				55°44′18″N 4°16′52″W	Category B	56	Upload Photo
'Moorland Cottage' 45 Polnoon Street				55°44′15″N 4°16′58″W	Category B	5222	Upload Photo
Eglinton Arms (Original N W Part Only) Gilmour Street				55°44′26″N 4°16′25″W	Category C(S)	5226	Upload Photo
Nos 5, 6 Montgomery Square				55°44′20″N 4°16′22″W	Category C(S)	5232	Upload Photo
86 Montgomery Street				55°44′12″N 4°16′52″W	Category C(S)	5252	Upload Photo
Polnoon Lodge Gilmour Street				55°44′30″N 4°16′28″W	Category B	5254	Upload Photo
'The Toll House' Cheapside Street				55°44′28″N 4°16′13″W	Category B	5206	Upload Photo
Polnoon Bridge Over Polnoon Water At Millhall				55°43′58″N 4°15′18″W	Category C(S)	5211	Upload Photo
Stoneybyres				55°43′06″N 4°14′02″W	Category C(S)	5212	Upload Photo

== Key ==
The scheme for classifying buildings in Scotland is:

- Category A: "buildings of national or international importance, either architectural or historic; or fine, little-altered examples of some particular period, style or building type."
- Category B: "buildings of regional or more than local importance; or major examples of some particular period, style or building type, which may have been altered."
- Category C: "buildings of local importance; lesser examples of any period, style, or building type, as originally constructed or moderately altered; and simple traditional buildings which group well with other listed buildings."

In March 2016 there were 47,288 listed buildings in Scotland. Of these, 8% were Category A, and 50% were Category B, with the remaining 42% being Category C.

== See also ==
- List of listed buildings in East Renfrewshire
