= John Kelly (footballer, born 1921) =

Scottish footballer

Personal information
- Full name: John Carmichael Kelly
- Date of birth: 21 February 1921
- Place of birth: Paisley, Scotland
- Date of death: 2 January 2001 (aged 79)
- Place of death: Paisley, Scotland
- Position: Left winger

Senior career*
Years	Team	Apps	(Gls)
1937–1939	Arthurlie		
1939–1941	Celtic	0	(0)
1941–1945	Morton	0	(0)
1945–1953	Barnsley	217	(25)
1953–1955	Falkirk	26	(0)
1955–1956	Morton	17	(6)
1956–1958	Halifax Town	38	(2)
- Portadown
Total		298	(33)

International career
1945	Scotland (wartime)	1	(0)
1948	Scotland	2	(0)
- * Club domestic league appearances and goals

John Carmichael Kelly (21 February 1921 – 2 January 2001) was a Scottish footballer, who played as a left winger for Arthurlie, Celtic, Morton, Barnsley, Falkirk, Halifax Town and Portadown. Kelly represented Scotland twice, in 1949 British Home Championship matches against Wales and Ireland.
