= Arthurlie =

Suburb of Barrhead, East Renfrewshire, Scotland

Coordinates: 55.796290°N 4.396691°W

Arthurlie is an area of the town of Barrhead, East Renfrewshire, Scotland.

== History of Arthurlie ==
The lands of Arthurlie were held in medieval times by the Stewart family, a branch of the noble Stewarts of Darnley. Later the lands became the property of Allan Pollock, Esq. and remained in his family for several generations before being inherited by Gavin Ralston of Woodside in Beith. The area has long been associated with the legends of King Arthur. The name means 'Arthur's meadow.' Arthurlie was a barony of considerable extent, however it eventually came to be purchased by Henry Dunlop Esq. in 1818 from Gavin Ralston, a distant relative.

The Dunlop family ran Gateside Cotton Mill under the name of James Dunlop & Son. The old house was torn down and Arthurlie House was erected with the old gardens extended and remodelled in 1818. The estate remained in the hands of the Dunlop family until about 1938. It was a Mr. Charles Taylor who discovered the ancient Arthurlee Cross being used as a gatepost on the estate and persuaded Henry Dunlop to rescue it.

=== Arthurlie House 2008 ===
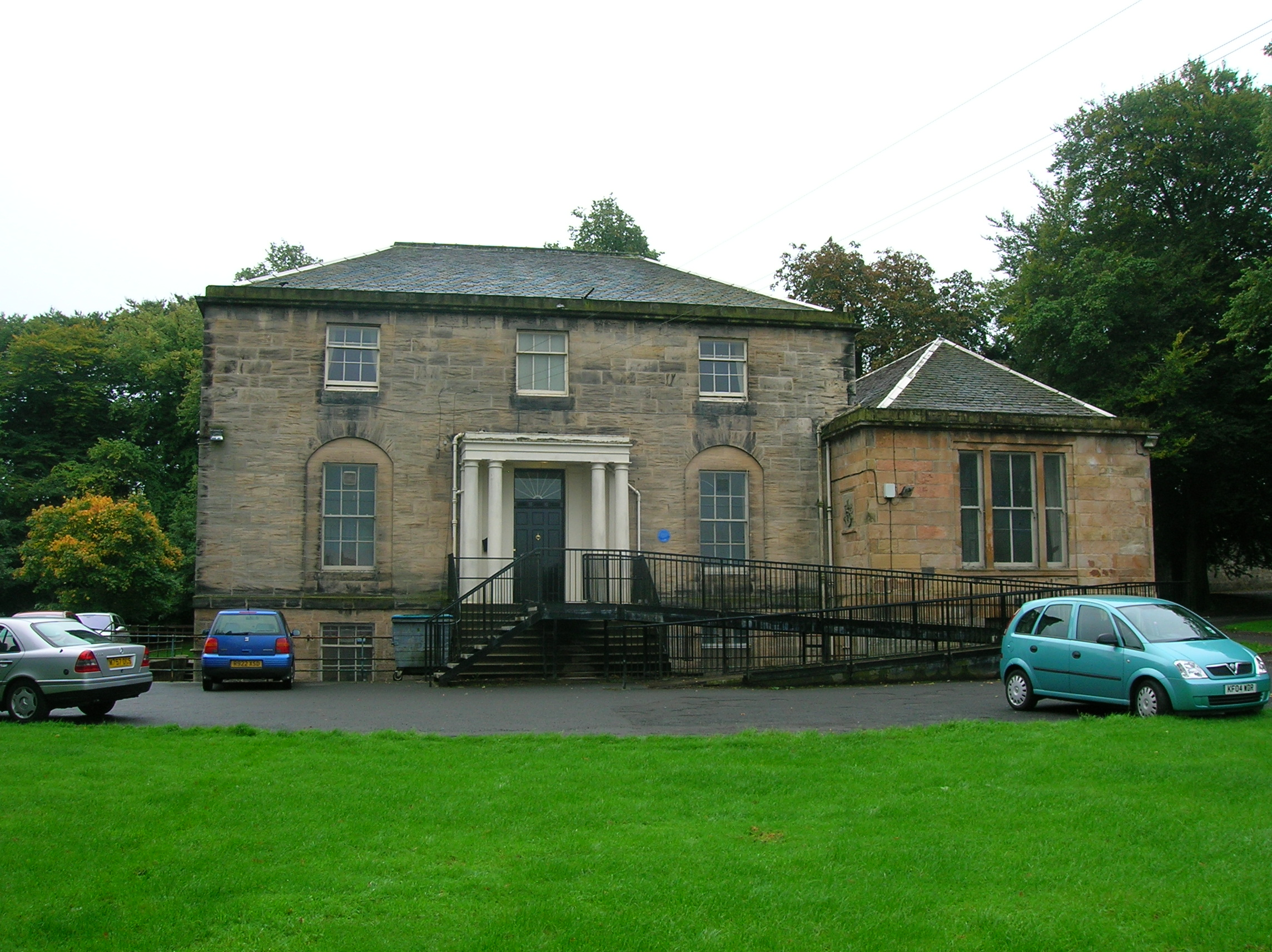
Arthurlie House from the front.

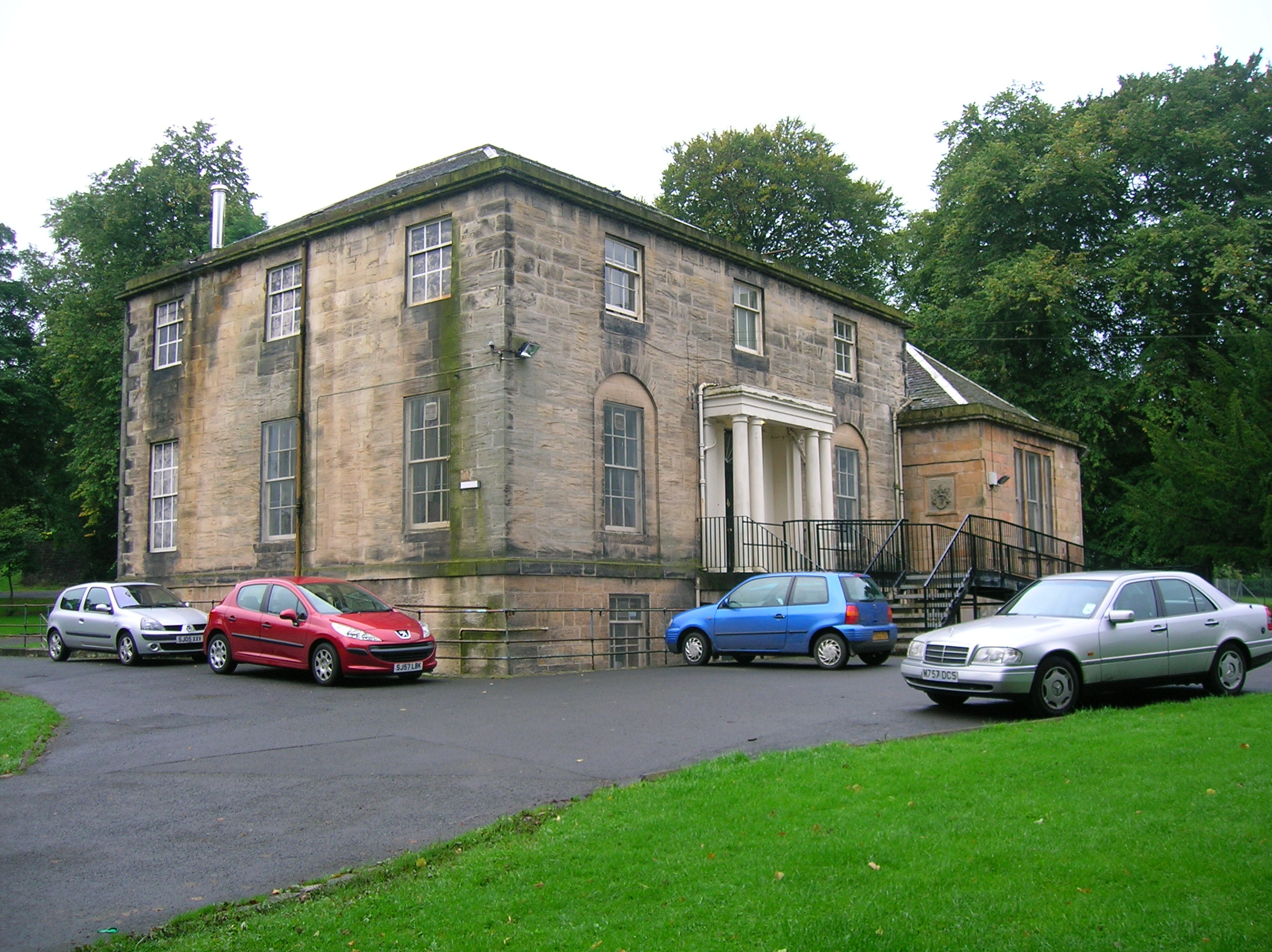
Arthulie House from the main driveway.

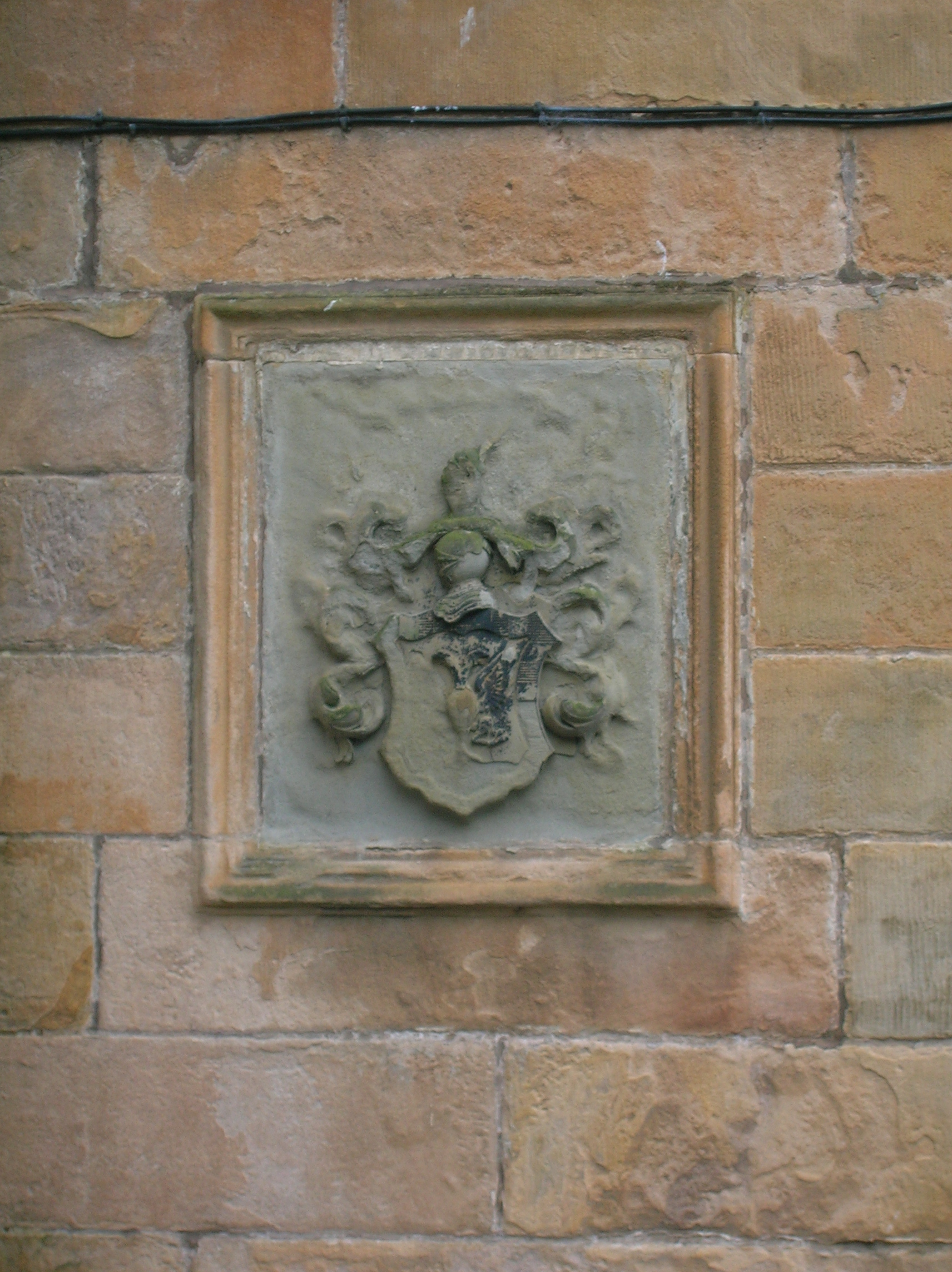
The Dunlop family Coat of Arms on the wall of the house.

== The Arthurlie Cross ==
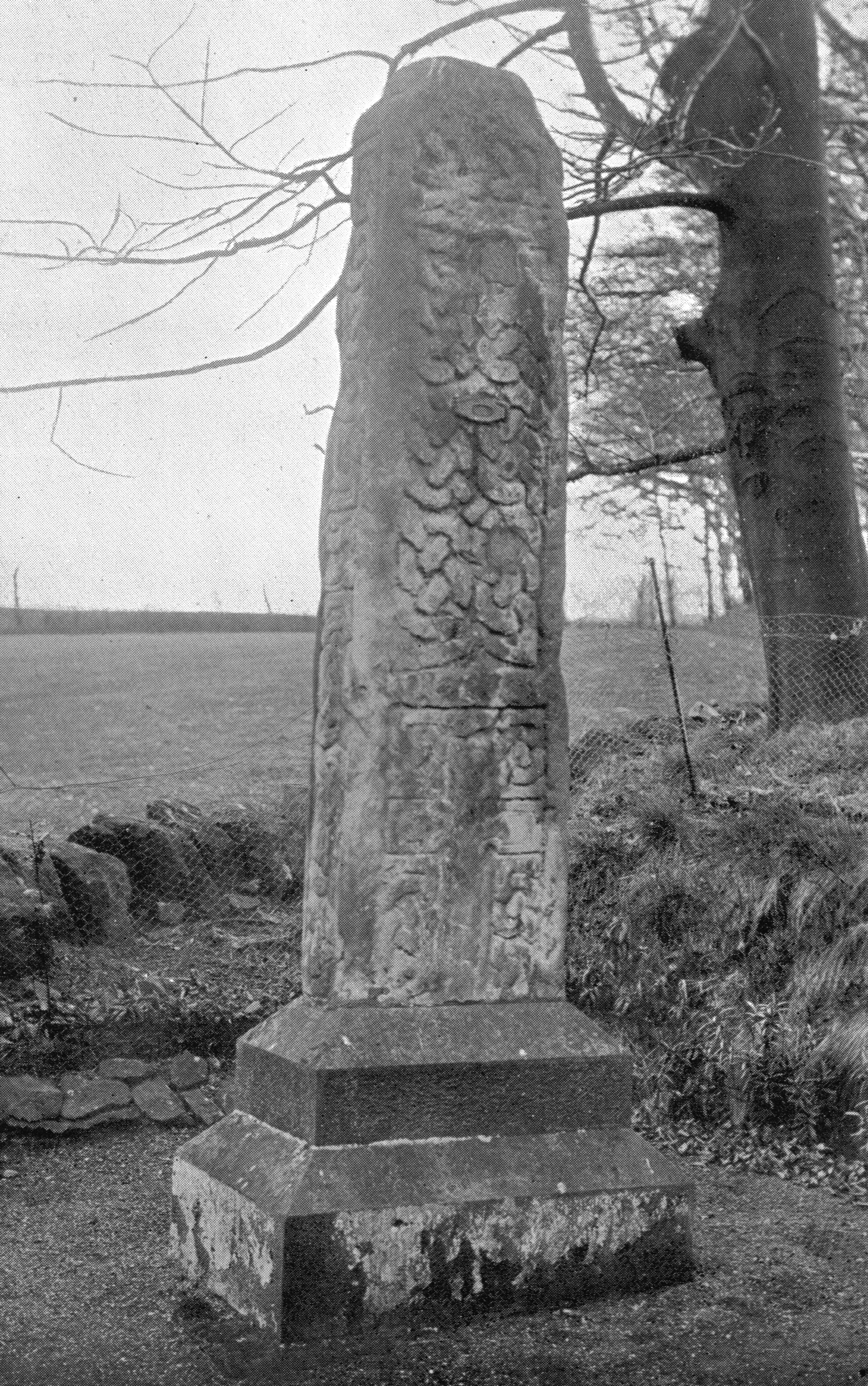
The Arthulie Stone or Cross in its setting of 1910 at Arthurlie House before it was moved.

This stone is a 9th - 10th century cross-shaft made from a very hard and compact sandstone, and it now stands at NS 4997 5854, by the roadside, set in a modern rectangular base and protected by railings. Stylistically, it belongs to the 'Govan School' of carving, as seen most notably in The Govan Stones collection at Govan Old Parish Church.

The cross measures 2.2 m (7 ft 3 in) high, 0.5 m (1 ft 8 in) wide, and 0.2 m (8 in) thick and is in good condition except that one face is badly worn. One side had an iron ring indented into it, almost flush with the surface, this being done during its time when it was being used as a gate post after it was no longer used as a bridge. In the 1857 Name Book it was believed that its original site had been at NS 4968 5813 in a field called Cross-stane-park. In 1795 it was acting as a footbridge over a stream in the Colinbar Glen area at the bottom of the Cross-stane-park (NS 497 580). It stayed there long enough to be worn smooth on one face; it was seen by the OS surveyor in 1857

In approximately 1870 it was erected in the grounds of Arthurlee House at NS 4979 5814 as shown in the photograph. Sometime prior to 1942 it was moved yet again by Barrhead Council to its present position.

The stone is said to be associated with Arthur, King of the Britons. Locally it was said to mark Arthur's grave or a conspicuous leader of that name.

=== Views of Arthurlie Cross 2008 ===
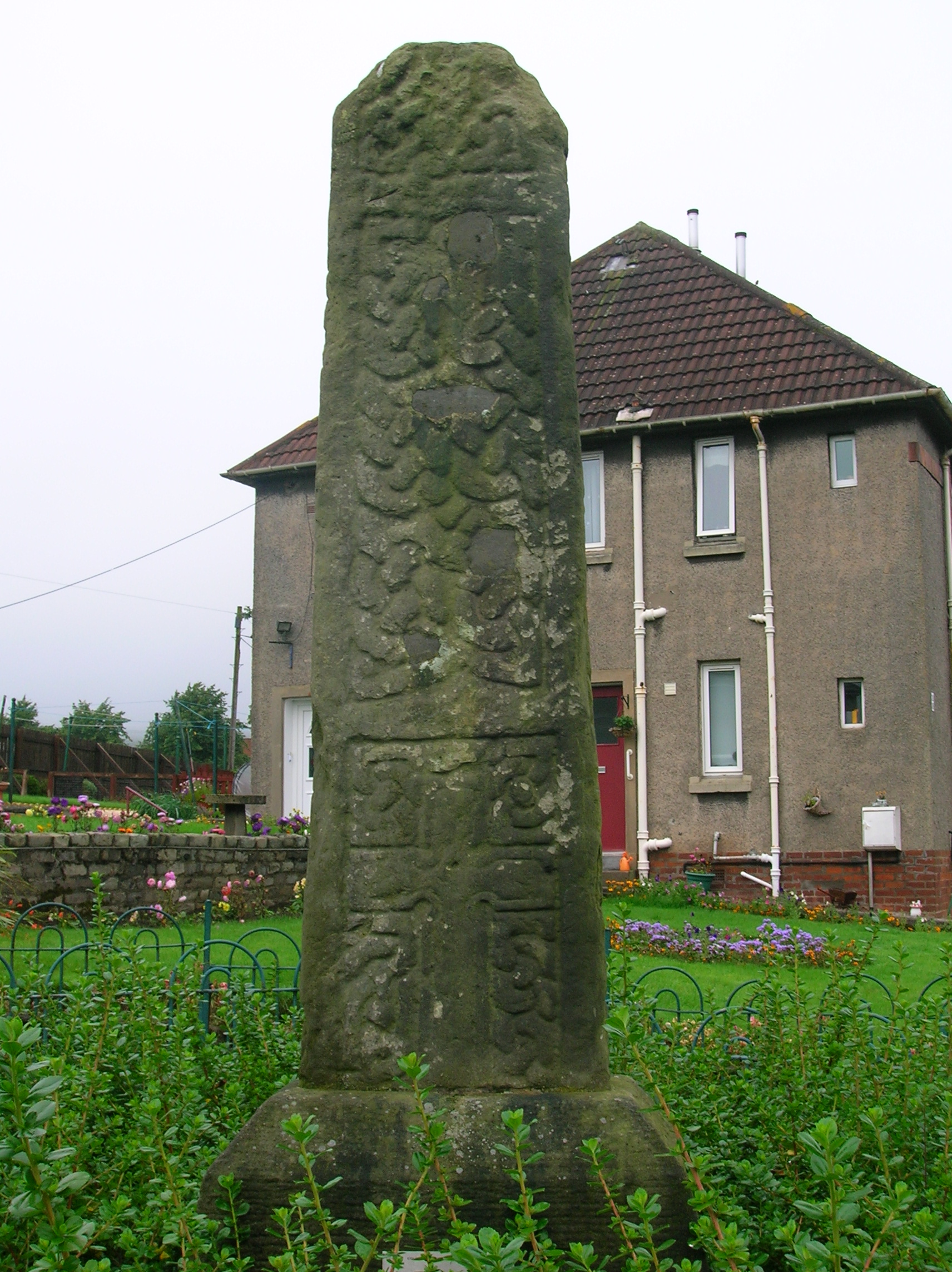
A view of the cross and Celtic interlace carving.

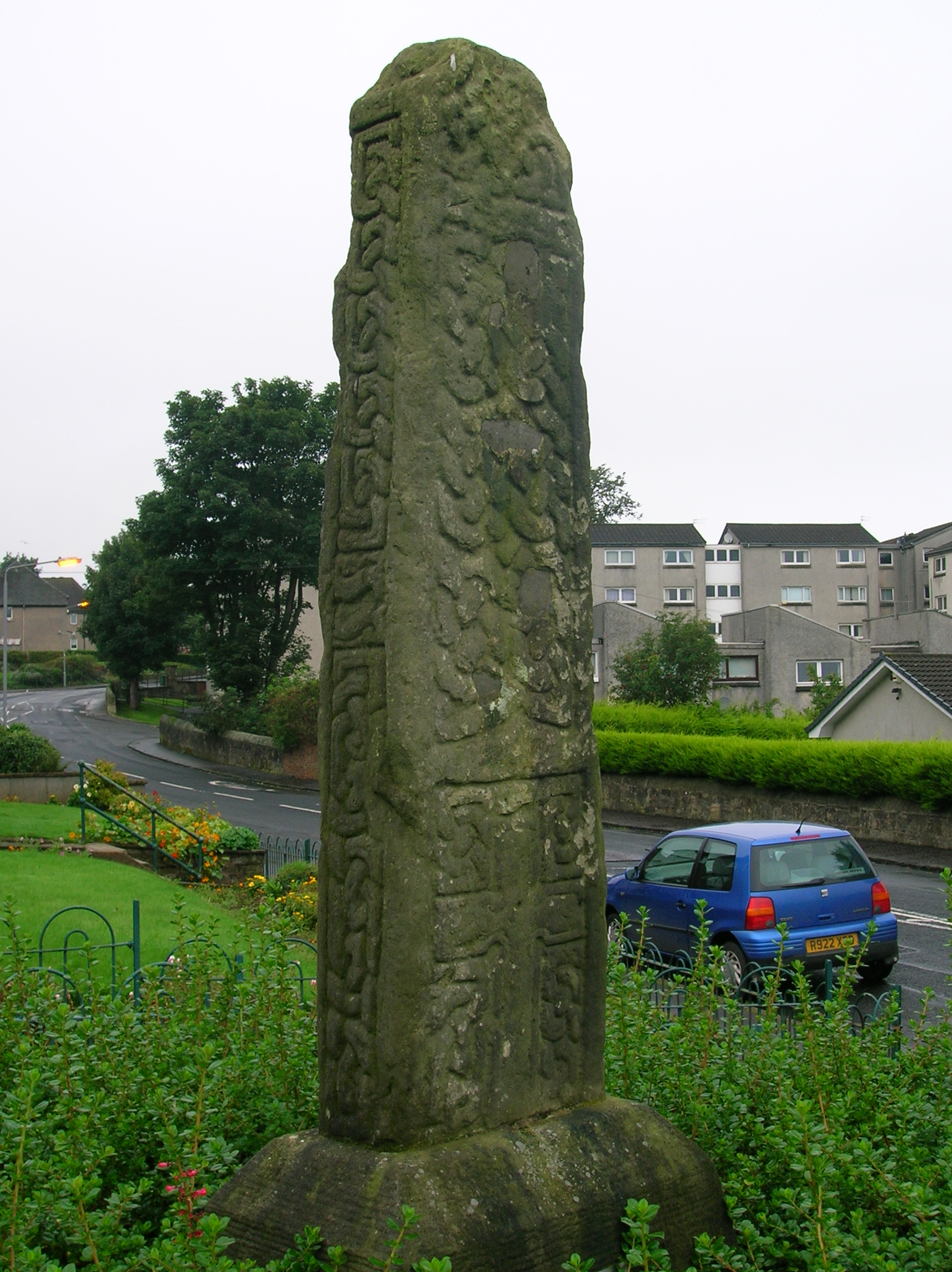
A view of the Celtic interlace carved panels on the side of the cross.

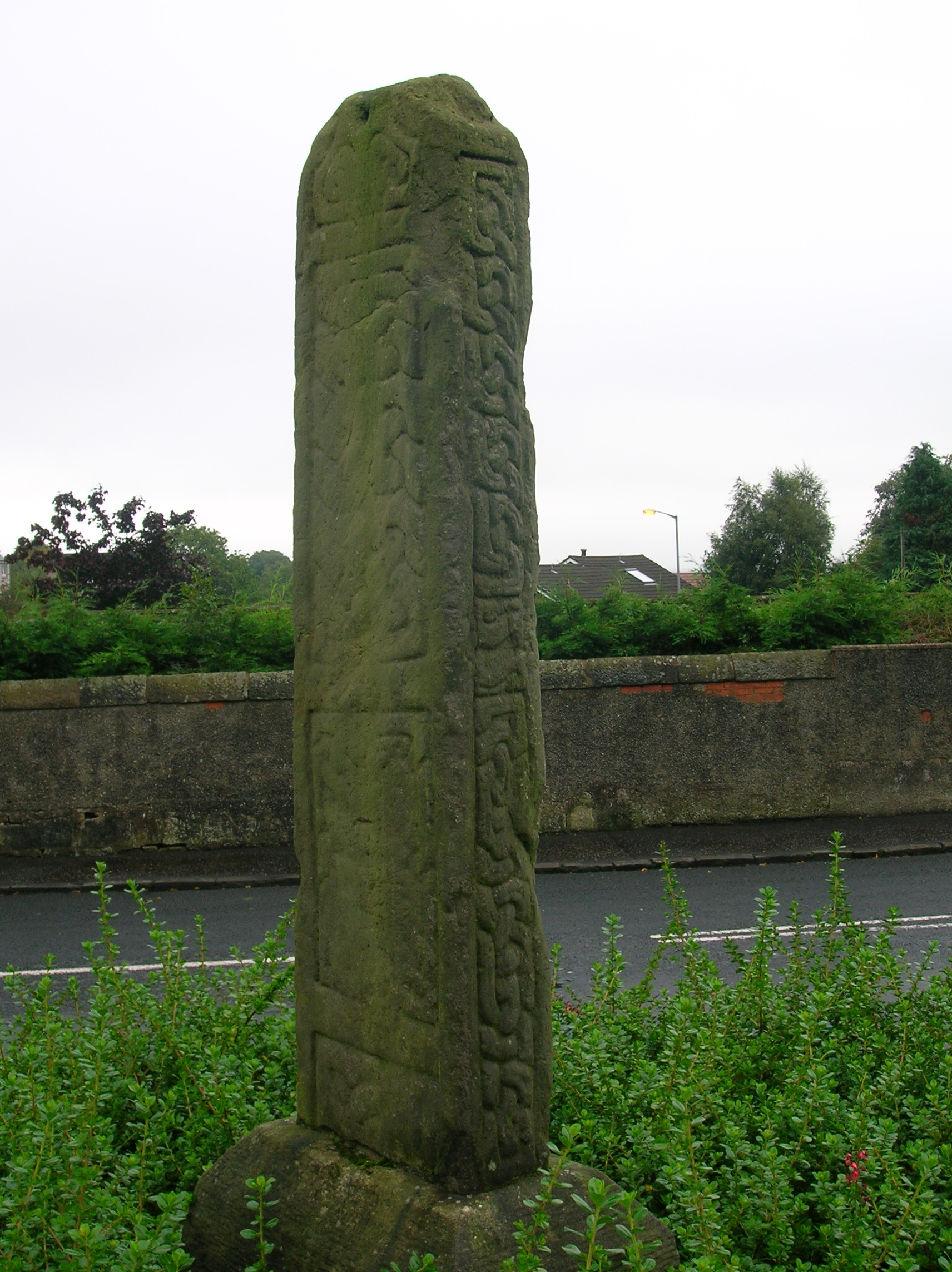
The worn side of the cross.

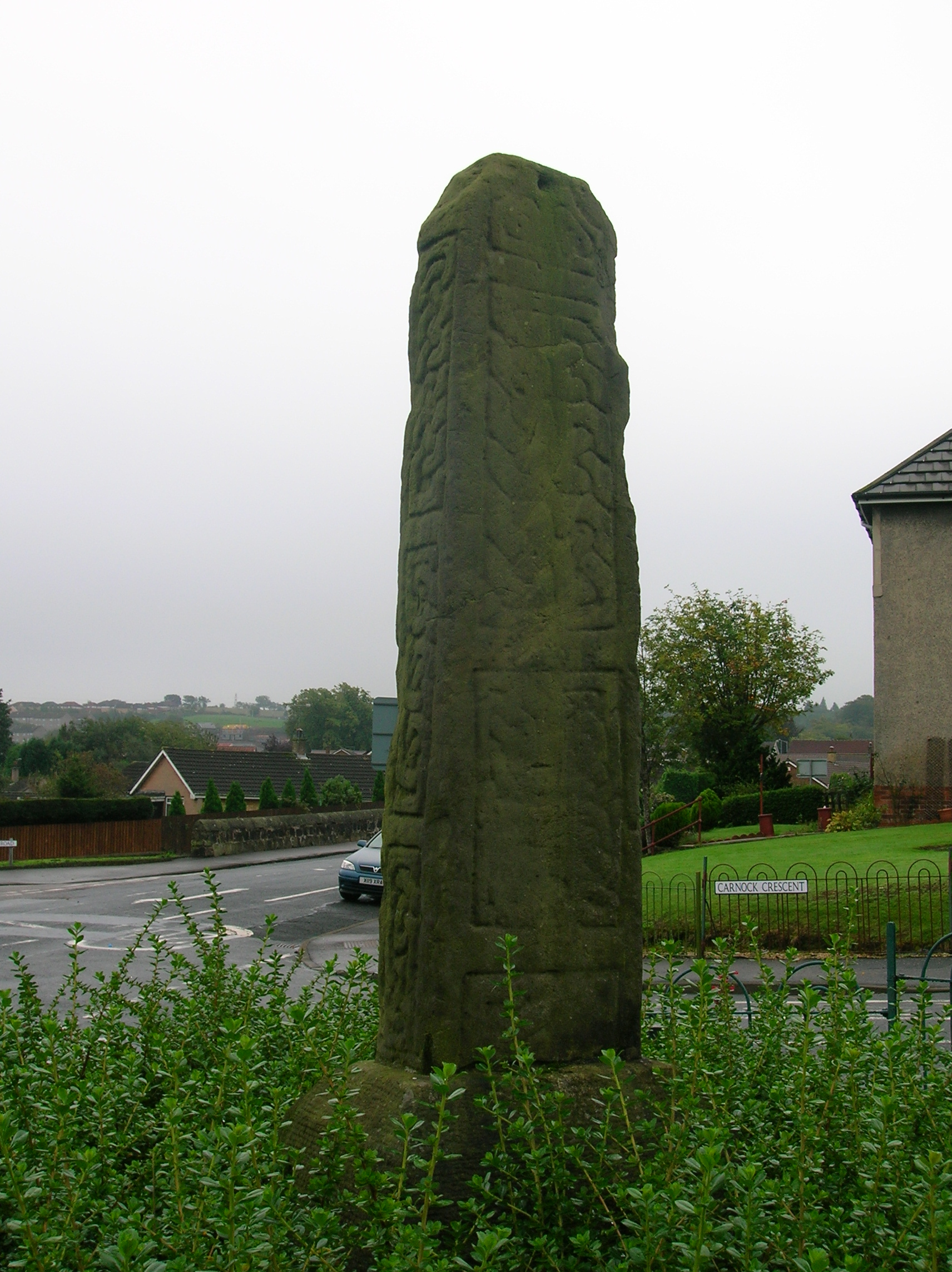
The other edge panels of the cross.
