= Ninian MacWhannell =

Scottish architect, author, and footballer

Personal information
- Date of birth: 15 October 1860
- Place of birth: Hutchesontown, Glasgow, Scotland
- Date of death: 23 December 1939 (aged 79)
- Place of death: Shawlands, Glasgow, Scotland

Senior career*
Years	Team	Apps	(Gls)
1885–1886	Queen's Park	0	(0)
- * Club domestic league appearances and goals

Ninian MacWhannell (15 October 1860 – 23 December 1939) was a Scottish architect, author, and footballer.

Born in Hutchesontown, MacWhannell attended Glasgow High School and Glasgow School of Art before becoming an architect.

He played football for Queen's Park, making five appearances for them, including appearing in the 1885 FA Cup Final.

He also wrote books about the Doric language and Robert Burns. He served as a councillor and magistrate.

MacWhannell was a prominent humanist and rationalist, serving as the President of the Glasgow branch of the Rationalist Press Association from its formation. On his death, he had a secular funeral, at the Western Crematorium, led by J. McCormick, Vice President of the Glasgow R.P.A.
