= Eastwood High School, Newton Mearns =

School in East Renfrewshire, Scotland

Coordinates: 55.788°N 4.329°W

Eastwood High School

Location
- Capelrig Road, Newton Mearns, G77; Newton Mearns, East Renfrewshire; Scotland

Information
- Type: Secondary
- Motto: Floreat Labore
- Established: 1936
- Head teacher: Kate Sinclair
- Enrolment: >1500
- Colours: Black, blue and yellow
- Website: blogs.glowscotland.org.uk/er/Eastwood

Eastwood High School is a comprehensive, non-denominational school located centrally in East Renfrewshire to the south of Glasgow, Scotland. It is one of the successor schools to Eastwood Senior Secondary School which opened in 1936 in Clarkston, Glasgow.

Eastwood High School is situated on Capelrig Road and has a large suburban, and partly rural, catchment area. It stands in the grounds of Capelrig House, constructed in 1769, which is a Category A building listed as being of architectural and historical importance. The school serves the immediate area of Newton Mearns and the villages of Neilston and Uplawmoor.

Eastwood High School's cluster primary schools are Crookfur, Mearns, Neilston and Uplawmoor.

A new state-of-the-art school building was built, replacing the 1960s building, and is now in full use. It was opened in August 2013. This has improved the teaching facilities. The improvements include two all-weather pitches and a new sports complex.

Past student enrollments have had upwards of 1500 pupils.

== Achievements ==
- Scottish Education Award (2005)
- Award for Multicultural Education, University of Aberdeen
- Investors in People award since 2005

Old school building 1965–2013	Current school building 2013–present

- Scotland's Evening Times ranked the Eastwood High School seventh in West Scotland in its 2009 rankings.
- Listed in the Herald Scotland's top fifty schools in Scotland (2011), with 21% of Eastwood High pupils achieving 5 or more Highers
- Gained Silver award (June 2010) in the Eco Schools Scotland Award Program
- Fair Trade School Status 2013

=== New school building ===
Work began on the new £32 million 'Eastwood High School' in August 2011. The building is now complete and the school is now fully functional. There is a swimming pool, sports halls, all-weather running track and sports grounds, which are also open to the public and clubs outwith school hours.

== Inspections ==
Eastwood High was last inspected by HMIE in December 2006 and gained a very favourable report with only three points identified for action. These were addressed by the time of the local authority follow up inspection in 2008.

A further inspection was carried out in 2015. The report was very good and the pupils were noted as friendly and hardworking.

== Departments ==
The subject areas in Eastwood High School are structured into nine faculties. Each has a faculty head who has overall management responsibility and leads the learning and teaching. The faculties are:

- English
- Mathematics
- Social Subjects (History/Geography/RMPS)
- Modern Languages (French/Spanish)
- Science (Biology/Chemistry/Physics)
- Technical Education/Home Economics
- Creative and Performing Arts (Art/Music/Drama)
- Physical Education
- BECS (Business Education and Computing Science)

== Notable former pupils ==
- Amy Corbett, designer (Lego Group), judge (Lego Masters (American TV series))
- Sir William Kerr Fraser GCB, senior civil servant and chancellor of Glasgow University
- Ricky Gardiner, guitarist
- Ricky Gillies, footballer (St Mirren)
- Kelly Macdonald, actress
- Peter May, author and screenwriter
- Gordon McIlwham, Scottish International rugby player (Glasgow Hawks)
- Shade Munro, Scottish International rugby player
- David Newton, jazz pianist and composer
- Tony Osoba, actor
- Brian Robertson, guitarist, Thin Lizzy
- James Simpson, former Moderator of the Church of Scotland
- Craig Watson, footballer (Airdrieonians)
- Jon Welsh, rugby player (Glasgow Warriors)
