= Mearns Castle High School =

Coordinates: 55.768°N 4.318°W

Location
- Waterfoot Road; Newton Mearns, East Renfrewshire, G77 5GU; Scotland

Information
- Type: Secondary School
- Motto: Servitium
- Established: 1978
- Local authority: East Renfrewshire
- Headteacher: Stuart Clark
- Staff: 132
- Gender: Mixed
- Age: 11 to 18
- Enrolment: 1,700
- Houses: Balmoral; Caledonia; Gleneagles; Sutherland; Ramsay; Wallace
- Colours: Red and Black
- Qualifications: Scottish Qualifications Certificate
- Website: www.ea.e-renfrew.sch.uk/mearnscastle/

Mearns Castle High School is a secondary school situated on Waterfoot Road in Newton Mearns, East Renfrewshire, Scotland roughly seven miles (eleven kilometres) from Glasgow. It was built in 1978, and pupils from Eaglesham Primary, Kirkhill Primary, Maidenhill Primary, Calderwood Lodge and Mearns Primary are all part of the school's catchment area.

Mearns Castle is situated next to Maxwell Mearns Church. It is also positioned next to Mearns Castle (15th century), hence the name, "Mearns Castle High School".

== Awards and recognition ==
The school's Senior Concert Band achieved significant success in the NCBF competitions achieving Gold Awards at both a Regional and National Level.

== Notable people ==
=== Faculty ===
- Harry Cairney, football player

=== Alumni ===
- Andrew Mullen, Paralympian swimmer
- Gayle Rankin, actress
- Aidan Zamiri, photographer and filmmaker
