= Barrhead =

Town in East Renfrewshire, Scotland

Coordinates: 55.801°N 4.389°W

Barrhead: Scottish Gaelic: Ceann a' Bharra; Scots: Baurheid
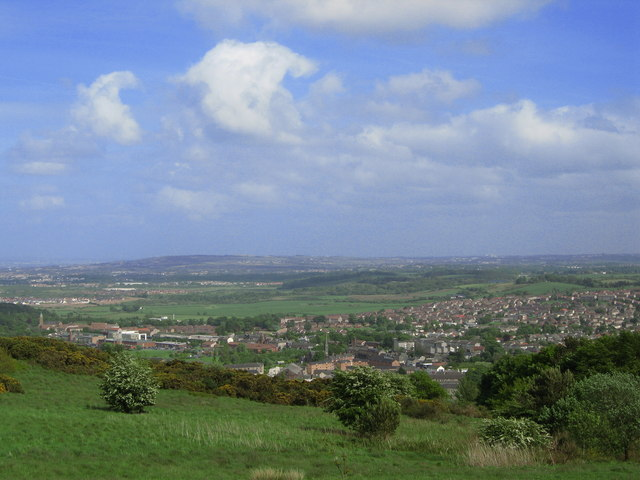
- Barrhead from the Fereneze Hills

- Location within East Renfrewshire Barrhead (East Renfrewshire)
- Population: 17,890 (2020)
- OS grid reference: NS505585
  - Edinburgh: 48 mi (77 km)
  - London: 344 mi (554 km)
- Council area: East Renfrewshire
- Lieutenancy area: Renfrewshire
- Country: Scotland
- Sovereign state: United Kingdom
- Post town: GLASGOW
- Postcode district: G78
- Dialling code: 0141
- Police: Scotland
- Fire: Scottish
- Ambulance: Scottish
- UK Parliament: East Renfrewshire
- Scottish Parliament: Renfrewshire South

Barrhead (Scots: Baurheid, Scottish Gaelic: Ceann a' Bharra) is a town in East Renfrewshire, Scotland, thirteen kilometres (8 mi) southwest of Glasgow city centre on the edge of the Fereneze Braes. At the 2011 census its population was 17,268.

== History ==
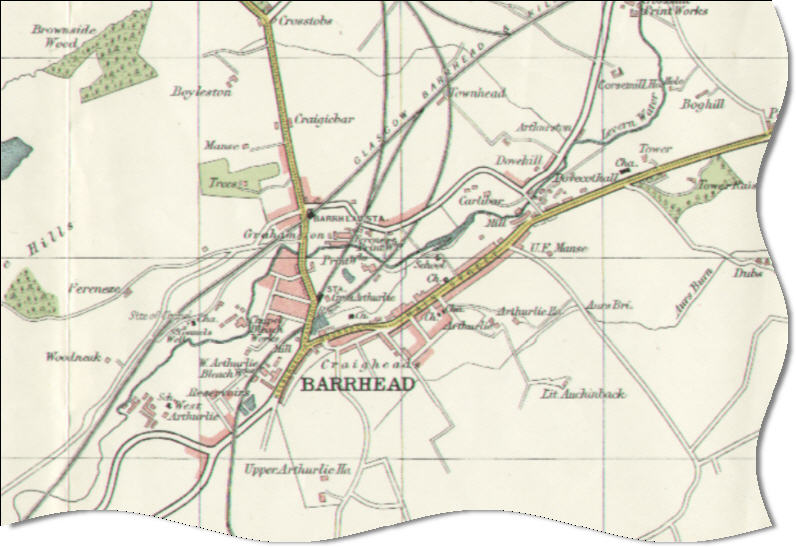
Map of Barrhead published in 1923

Barrhead was formed when a series of small textile-producing villages (Barrhead, Arthurlie, Grahamston and Gateside) gradually grew into one another to form one continuous town. According to local historian James McWhirter, the name "Barrhead" first appeared in 1750. Glanderston House, to the south, at one time belonged to the Stewart kings of Scotland.

In 1851 there was an explosion at the Victoria Pit colliery in nearby Nitshill, killing 63 men and boys who worked in the mine, many of whom lived in Barrhead. The victims were buried in a mass grave in the yard at St John's Church on Darnley Road, and although some bodies were later exhumed and reburied in other cemeteries, some may still reside at St John's in an unmarked grave.

In 1890, with a rapidly expanding population approaching 10,000, various local residents formed a Barrhead Burgh Formation Committee. The status of police burgh was granted in 1894 and William Shanks, proprietor of a local company, was elected as the first provost of Barrhead.

During the 19th and early 20th centuries, the town was a major centre for manufacturing, with industries including an iron foundry, a tannery, and the Armitage Shanks porcelainware works, as well as Gaskell's carpet factory, employing generations of the town's residents. In the later 20th century, the decline and closure of nearly all of these industries caused a fall in local employment and population. In recent years, Barrhead has found new life as a popular residential commuter town for nearby Paisley and Glasgow.

During World War II, several bombs fell on Barrhead from German planes headed towards Clydebank and Yoker.

== Governance ==
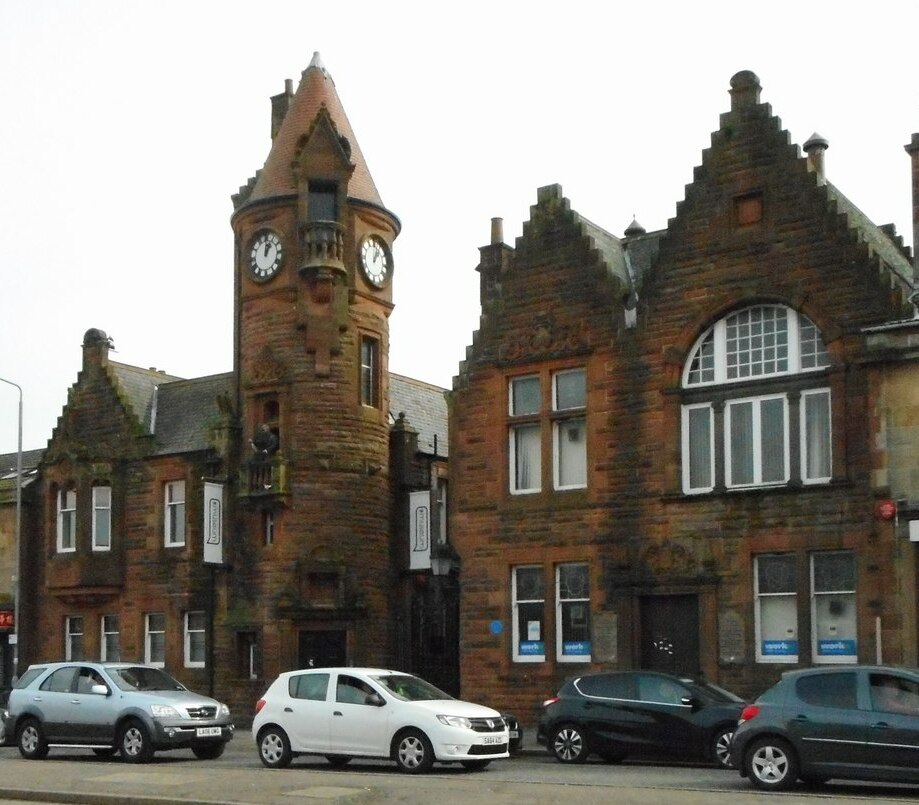
Barrhead Burgh Hall

In 1894 Barrhead became a burgh of barony, meaning that it had its own town council. The council was based at Barrhead Burgh Hall. The burgh status was abolished in 1975 under the Local Government (Scotland) Act 1973 when Strathclyde Regional Council and Renfrew District Council were formed. Subsequent reorganisation to a single-tier local authority in 1996 placed Barrhead under the auspices of East Renfrewshire Council. Barrhead is a single council ward, electing four members to serve as part of East Renfrewshire Council.

Barrhead is part of the county constituency of East Renfrewshire, electing one Member of Parliament (MP) to the House of Commons of the Parliament of the United Kingdom. Blair McDougall of Scottish Labour was elected to represent East Renfrewshire in the 2024 UK general election.

In the Scottish Parliament, Barrhead forms part of the Renfrewshire South constituency, represented by Tom Arthur of the SNP. Barrhead is also represented by seven regional MSPs from the West of Scotland electoral region.

== Geography ==
Barrhead forms part of the Greater Glasgow conurbation. Areas within the town include Arthurlie, Auchenback, Gateside and Grahamston.

The town is about 1 mile (1.5 kilometres) from the edge of the Glasgow urban area (Hurlet and Parkhouse neighbourhoods), separated by farmland and countryside, much of which is now part of the Dams to Darnley Country Park, encompassing the Balgray and Waulkmill Glen Reservoirs and the course of the Brock Burn.

== Economy ==
Major businesses within the town include Barrhead Travel, Kelburn Brewing Company, and JM Murdoch & Son, among others. The town's largest employer is East Renfrewshire Council and the public sector. In 2002, part of the administration of East Renfrewshire Council relocated from Eastwood Park to Barrhead Main Street.

East Renfrewshire Council committed nearly £100 million to a masterplan to redevelop and modernise Barrhead's economy between 2007 and 2017. The Glasgow Road corridor is being redeveloped into a dedicated business district which includes Crossmill Business Park, Blackbyres Court, and the former Bowerwalls housing area.

There are four industrial estates: Robertson Street Industrial Estate, Levern Industrial Estate at Cogan Street, Muriel Street, and the Barrhead Cargo Centre and Shanks Industrial Park, located on the former site of the Armitage Shanks factory.

In 2005 local businesses created the Barrhead Business Forum, which liaises with East Renfrewshire Council, Barrhead Community Council, and East Renfrewshire Chamber of Commerce.

The administration and collection of business rates for Barrhead is undertaken by Renfrewshire Council.

In October 2016, Barrhead businesses voted in favour of becoming a Business Improvement District (BID), which is a model proving successful for town centres across the UK and beyond. The Barrhead BID is called 'All About Barrhead' and is the third BID in East Renfrewshire, following Giffnock which established in 2013 and Clarkston which is now in its second term, establishing in 2010.

The town is part of the NHS Greater Glasgow and Clyde Health Board. The nearest accident and emergency unit is located at the Royal Alexandra Hospital in Paisley.

== Transport ==
Barrhead is accessible via Junction 2 (Pollok) or Junction 3 (Darnley) of the M77 motorway.

Local bus services, McGill's Bus Services, travel from Barrhead to Glasgow, Paisley, Neilston, and Newton Mearns.

Barrhead railway station, which serves the town, is on the Glasgow South Western Line. Trains from Barrhead run north-east to Glasgow Central and south to Kilmarnock, Stranraer, and Carlisle. However a new train station, Balgray railway station is set to open in Spring 2026, to serve the south of Barrhead.

At the beginning of the 20th century, several railway lines ran through Barrhead to accommodate the town's manufacturing industries: the Glasgow Barrhead and Neilston Direct Railway and the Glasgow and Kilmarnock Joint Railway, which merged to become the Glasgow, Barrhead and Kilmarnock Joint Railway; the Glasgow & South Western Railway, which built Barrhead Central railway station as the terminus of its short-lived Barrhead branch; and the Caledonian Railway. Evidence of these lines can still be seen within the town, including two standalone sections of railway viaduct, one near the Tesco store and the other now carrying a footpath between Springhill Road and the Woodside Park in Upper Auchenback (known locally as the Jerry Park).

Barrhead was formerly served by routes 14 and 28 of the once extensive Glasgow Corporation Tramways system. Trams ran from Barrhead to Glasgow and Paisley. Glasgow tram service 14 was once the longest in Great Britain, running from Milngavie on the far north-western edge of Greater Glasgow, through the city centre and then through Thornliebank, Spiersbridge, Barrhead and Paisley to reach Renfrew Ferry on the south side of the Clyde. Tramway services in Paisley and Barrhead were withdrawn in 1957; the entire system was dismantled by September 1962.

=== Future ===
A new railway station, Balgray railway station, opened on 27 September 2026.

== Education ==
Barrhead has five primary schools: Carlibar Primary School, Cross Arthurlie Primary School, Hillview School, St. John's Roman Catholic Primary School and St. Mark's Roman Catholic Primary School. In 2007, St. Mark's received an outstanding report from HM Inspectorate of Education with 11 "excellents" – the most ever recorded by HMIE – making St. Mark's officially the best primary school in Scotland.

The new Carlibar Primary School, opened in the autumn of 2006 to replace an outdated building, hosts a family centre, a pre-school assessment unit, community and adult learning services, and a state-of-the-art language and communication unit which serves nearly 50 children with autism from across East Renfrewshire.

The town has two secondary schools: St. Luke's High School and Barrhead High School, both in the Auchenback area. In 2017, a £30 million replacement building for Barrhead High was opened. The new Barrhead High School, opened in 2017 to replace an old building, now hosts a wide range of courses with state of the art resources and equipment, with the new building Barrhead High School is very lucky to be one of the few schools in Scotland to be able to offer vocational courses.

== Culture ==
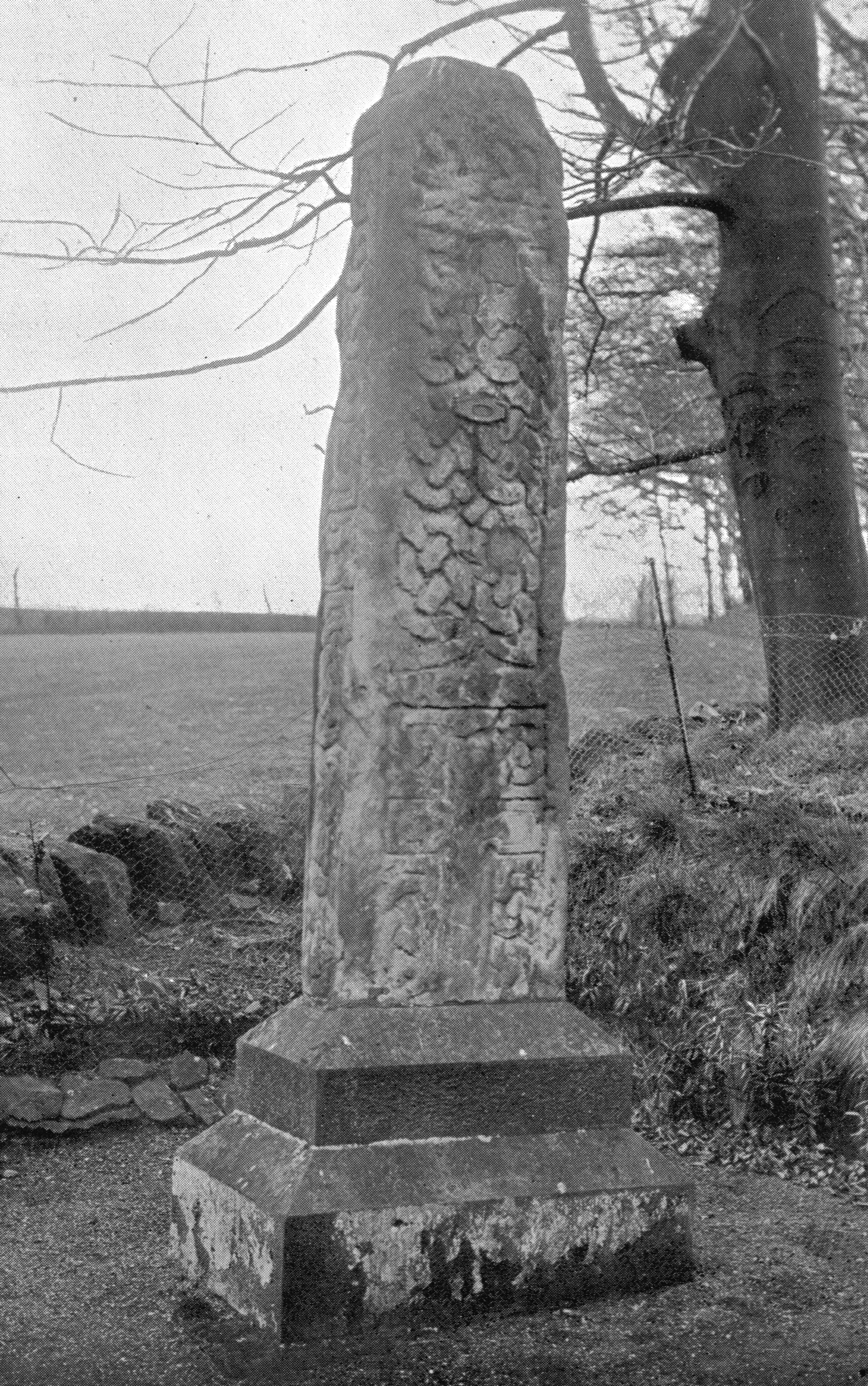
The Arthurlie Stone or Cross in its 1910 setting at Arthurlie House before it was moved to the housing scheme

The Royal Shakespeare Company has staged full performances in Barrhead five times, most recently "The Canterbury Tales" in 2006, using a mobile performance venue set up in Barrhead Sports Centre.

There are several public houses in Barrhead. These include Cross Stobs, The Kelburn, The Arthurlie Inns, and The Brig Inn. The Cross Stobs dates back to at least 1695.

== Sports ==
An active Scottish Junior football team, Arthurlie, plays in Barrhead, with a previous club of the same name having played as a senior league side until 1929. The earlier team was renowned for its 4–2 defeat of Celtic in the 1897 Scottish Cup. Arthurlie's Johnny Kelly went on to play for Celtic and Barnsley and won several caps for Scotland. The team won the Scottish Junior Cup in 1998.

Alex McLeish, Scotland's most capped defender with 77 caps and national team coach, went to school in Barrhead. In the early 20th century, the town produced three brothers, Alec Logan, James Logan and Tommy Logan who all played for either Scotland or the Scottish League XI.

Barrhead Boys Club, founded in 1972 and recently renamed as Barrhead Youth Football Club, caters for children as young as 6 years old, up to 21, and also has adult and veteran teams.

Barrhead is home to four bowling clubs: Barrhead, Arthurlie, Shanks, and St John's. Founded in 1904, the Fereneze Golf Club is the town's mature moorland 18-hole course boasting spectacular panoramic views over the Clyde Valley. Barrhead Boxing Club has produced several contenders at Scottish Amateur level as well as several professional contenders in recent years, while the town's several Muay Thai clubs have produced some notable championship fighters.

A greyhound racing track, was opened on ground off the Aurs Road on Saturday 7 July 1934. The racing was independent (not affiliated to the sports governing body the National Greyhound Racing Club) known as a flapping track, which was the nickname given to independent tracks. The track raced over 300 and 325 yards. The date of closure is not known.

== Churches ==
Major churches in Barrhead include St. John the Evangelist Roman Catholic Church on Aurs Road, the Church of Scotland parish churches of Bourock and St. Andrew's, both on Main Street, and the United Reformed Church on Arthurlie Street.

There is also a Methodist church and several small Evangelical churches. There is also a small Church of God in Barrhead.

== In literature ==
Barrhead Station features in The Five Red Herrings, a detective novel by Dorothy L Sayers.

== Notable people ==
- Lee Ashcroft, footballer
- Christopher Brookmyre, author
- Sir Harry Burns, professor of global health
- Ken Currie, artist
- John Davidson, poet
- Ellen Dawson, radical and trade unionist
- Dr John Duignan, writer
- James David Provins Graham, pharmacologist
- Paul Hanvidge, darts player
- Jamie Harvey, darts player
- Douglas Henshall, actor
- Johnny Kelly, footballer
- Helen Macfarlane, radical writer
- Barrie McKay footballer
- Alex McLeish ex-footballer and ex-Scotland manager
- Bob McPhail, footballer
- James Maxton, socialist
- David Nish, chief executive of Standard Life
- Mark O'Hara, football player
- Marianne Saliba, Australian mayor
- James Shaw, schoolmaster
- Adam S. T. Thomson, engineer
