= Mearns Castle =

Coordinates: 55°46.1101′N 4°18.5415′W

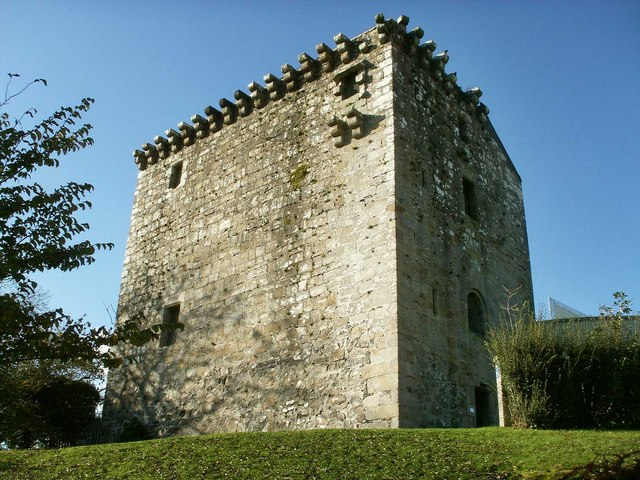
Mearns Castle

Mearns Castle is a 15th-century tower house in Newton Mearns, East Renfrewshire, south of Glasgow, Scotland. It is a Category A listed building. The castle has been restored and is now part of the Maxwell Mearns Castle Church. It also gives its name to nearby Mearns Castle High School.

== History ==
The castle was built by Herbert, Lord Maxwell, under a royal warrant issued in 1449, and remained with the family until James VI required the fifth Lord to deliver it up to the crown. It was sold to Sir George Maxwell of Nether Mearns in the mid-17th century, and later passed to the Shaw-Stewart family. In 1971 the tower's remaining storeys were converted to a link between two Church of Scotland buildings.

== Description ==
The castle was originally a four-storey rectangular tower measuring 30 by 40 feet (9.1 by 12.2 m) with walls 10 feet (3.0 m) thick; parts of the original corbelling remain. Its lower walls are rubble masonry up to a height of about 10 feet, the upper walls are constructed from well-cut ashlar blocks, demonstrating that the tower was probably built on the foundations of an earlier building. The arched main entrance on the first storey was reached by a ladder, but is now walled up.

Only faint traces of the castle's outerworks can be located. A barmkin followed the edges of the rocky knoll on which the building stands and the sloping ground on the southeast has been cut away to form a bank approximately 10 feet high, over which a causeway led to the tower's gatehouse.

There is a vaulted basement room, approached from the main entrance. The first-floor hall, which is also vaulted, is approached by a straight mural stair; it has stone window seats and once had a minstrels’ gallery.

== Bibliography ==
- Lindsay, Maurice (1994) The Castles of Scotland. Constable. ISBN 0-09-473430-5
- Historic Environment Scotland. "Church of Maxwell, Mearns Castle, Broom Road, by Newton Mearns (Category A Listed Building) (LB18536)".
