= Newton Mearns =

Coordinates: 55.7716°N 4.3347°W

Newton Mearns: Scottish Gaelic: Baile Ùr na Maoirne
- Town
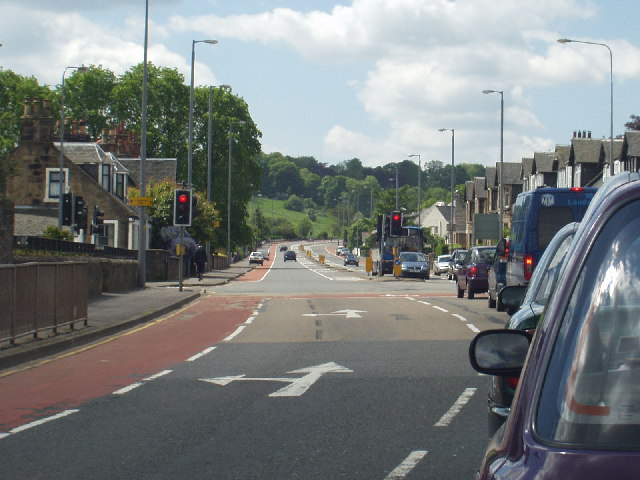
- Mearns Cross

- Location within East Renfrewshire Newton Mearns (East Renfrewshire)
- Population: 28,210 (2020)
- OS grid reference: NS536556
- Council area: East Renfrewshire
- Lieutenancy area: Renfrewshire
- Country: Scotland
- Sovereign state: United Kingdom
- Post town: GLASGOW
- Postcode district: G77
- Dialling code: 0141
- Police: Scotland
- Fire: Scottish
- Ambulance: Scottish
- UK Parliament: East Renfrewshire
- Scottish Parliament: Eastwood

Newton Mearns (Scottish Gaelic: Baile Ùr na Maoirne [ˈpalə ˈuːɾ nə ˈmɯːrˠɲə]) is a town and the largest settlement in East Renfrewshire, Scotland. It lies 7 miles (11 km) south-west of Glasgow City Centre on historically the main road to Ayrshire, 410 feet (125 m) above sea level. It has a population of approximately 26,993, stretching from Whitecraigs and Kirkhill in the north-east to Maidenhill in the south-east, to Westacres and Greenlaw in the west and Capelrig/Patterton in the north-west.

It is part of the Greater Glasgow conurbation. Its name derives from being a new town of the parish of Mearns (from Brythonic maoirne, meaning a stewartry). It is known for being one of Greater Glasgow's wealthiest areas, and historically has been part of one of the strongest Conservative-voting constituencies in Scotland.

== History ==
The area surrounding Newton Mearns has been inhabited since prehistory, with the remains of an Iron Age hillfort visible on the nearby Duncarnock hill. Ownership of the region passed from Roland de Mearns, who was granted the land by Walter fitz Alan, to the Pollocks (whose name is perpetuated in the nearby Glasgow housing estate of Pollok), and then to the Maxwells of Caerlaverock around 1300. During the 15th century, the towerhouse of Mearns Castle was built. The town then passed to the Maxwells of Nether Pollok in 1648 and then the Stewarts of Blackhall in 1660. A new turnpike road from Eastwood Toll, now the main Ayr Road, was constructed in 1832. By the end of the 18th century quarrying had developed and more importantly numerous textile mills and finishing works became established availing themselves of the numerous rivers and lochs for water supply. The 1893 'Ordnance Gazetteer of Scotland' describes it as "pleasantly situated on a rising ground 410 feet [120 metres] above sea-level". It also reveals that it was a 'burgh of barony' which bestowed the right to hold a weekly market and two annual fairs. However, the Gazetteer also describes the village as being only a "single street on the Glasgow and Kilmarnock highroad".

From the early 20th century, with the introduction of improved roads and railways to the area, it gradually became a growing commuter suburb of Glasgow. In the 1930s, between speculative and local authority housing ventures, a further 6,000 houses were added to the area and after a lull during the war years, in the 1950s, house building began again in earnest. Unfortunately, the old core village suffered neglect during and after World War II and was all but derelict by the 1960s. It was purchased and turned into a shopping centre which was later to become 'The Avenue at Mearns' in 1990.

Historical buildings in the area include the 15th century Mearns Castle, Greenbank House owned by the National Trust for Scotland (just inside neighbouring Clarkston) and the 1813 Mearns Kirk.

=== Pollock Castle ===
Glasgow University Archaeological Research Division (GUARD) undertook work on the Pollock Castle site, and history in 2000.

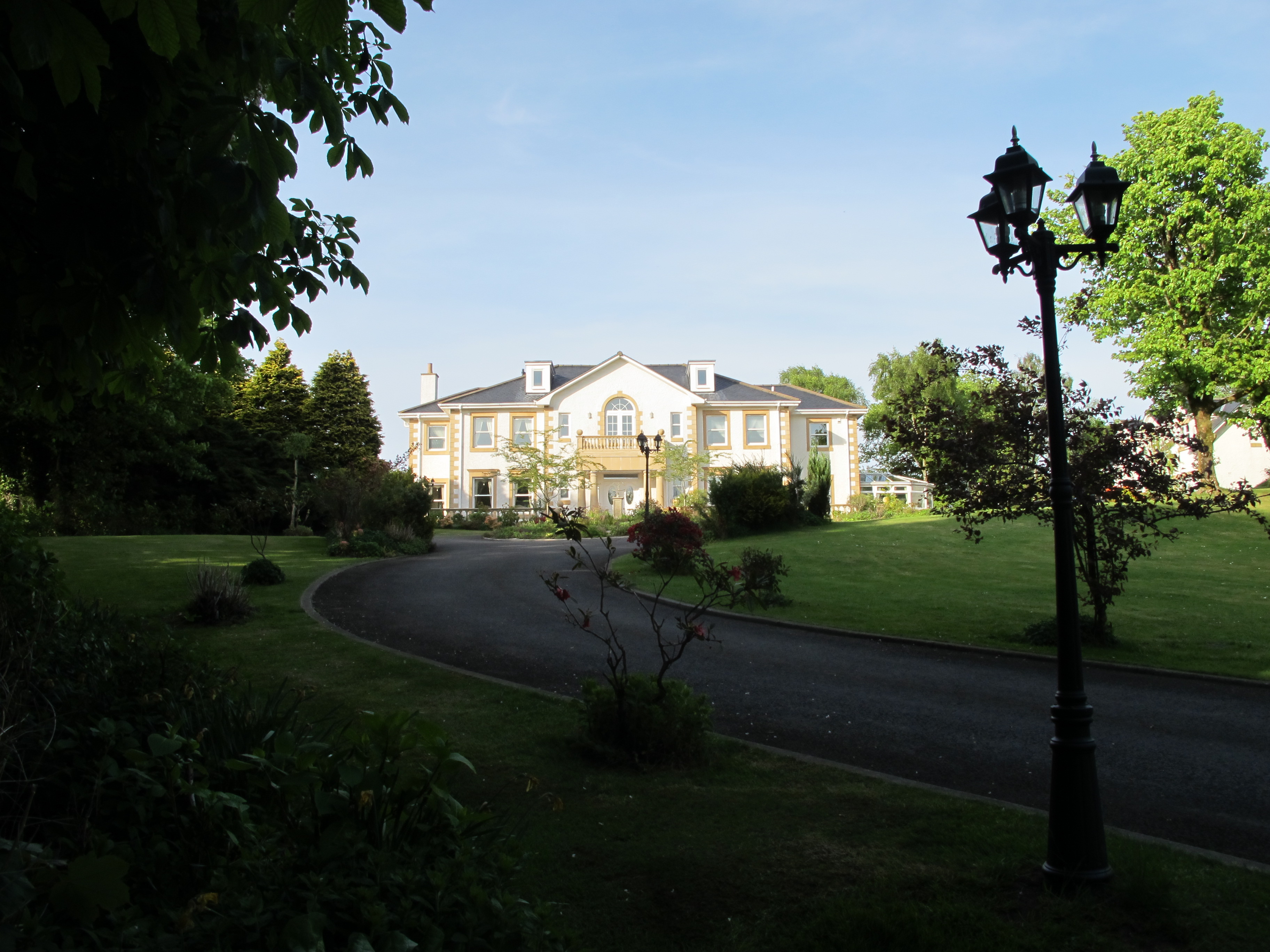
Pollok Castle, built 2003

The castle appears to be noted by Pont's sixteenth-century map. The castle was demolished and rebuilt as a large stately house 1686 by Sir Robert Pollok. It was completely destroyed by fire in 1882 (after remaining empty for some while) and then rebuilt again shortly after in the Scottish Baronial style. It was finally abandoned in the 1940s and fell into ruin. Some of the ruins were dynamited in the 1970s and a large prefabricated house erected on the castle foundations. The prefabricated house was removed and the site cleared in the early 1990s, and the castle was again rebuilt in 2003, in the Scottish Adam style. Some of the original foundations and castle walls remain.

== Governance ==
At national level, Newton Mearns forms part of the Eastwood constituency (since renamed to its original name of East Renfrewshire), and historically, it was one of Scotland's safest Conservative seats in the Parliament of the United Kingdom. From the 1997 general election, when Barrhead and Neilston were added to the constituency, until 2015 the seat was held by Labour. In the 2015 election it was gained represented by the SNP's Kirsten Oswald, but in 2017 general election it was gained by the Conservative Paul Masterton. Oswald regained the seat in the 2019 general election.

Newton Mearns forms part of the Eastwood constituency in the Scottish Parliament. The seat was held by Labour's Ken Macintosh from 1999, when the parliament reconvened, until 2016. In 2016, Jackson Carlaw MSP, won the seat for the Conservatives.

Following the breakup of Strathclyde Regional Council in 1996, Newton Mearns became part of the new East Renfrewshire Council area.

=== Councillors ===
As a result of the introduction of the Single Transferable Vote system for Scottish local council elections, it was planned that, in time for elections taking place in and after 2007, the town would be divided into two multi-councillor wards: Liboside and Newton Mearns North and Newton Mearns South. However, due to a number of complaints about the new divisions, the former was renamed Neilston, Uplawmoor and Newton Mearns North, in a move to keep Neilston an integral part of the council. The current councillors for the areas are as follows:

==== Newton Mearns North and Neilston ====
Councillor	Party
Andrew Morrison	Conservative
Tony Buchanan	Scottish National Party
Owen O'Donnell	Labour

==== Newton Mearns South and Eaglesham ====
Councillor	Party
Caroline Bamforth	Scottish National Party
Paul Edlin	Conservative
Andrew Anderson	Labour
Jim McLean	Conservative

== Economy ==
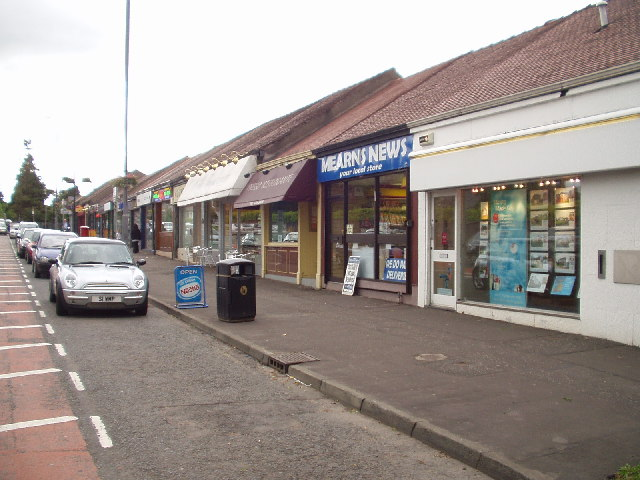
Ayr Road Shops

Newton Mearns is primarily a residential area, with most of its inhabitants travelling by car or public transport to Glasgow for employment and shopping. However, there are a number of small businesses in the area, as well as an indoor shopping centre.

The Avenue Shopping Centre is the main large retail centre in Newton Mearns. It comprises a total of 44 stores, currently including two supermarkets, three banks, nine clothing stores, food shops, restaurants and a library. The line of the main shopping area in the Avenue runs the course of the old Mearns Main Street. There are also shopping units and restaurants at Broom on the Ayr Road, shopping units and restaurants at Broomburn on the Mearns Road, and shopping units and restaurants at Crookfur on Harvie Avenue. The newly constructed Greenlaw Village close to the M77 at Crookfur Road also has two supermarkets, a hotel, smaller shops and a number of restaurants.

The 120 homes in the Hugh Fraser Retirement Estate have been fitted with smart technology and sensors, giving residents control of heating, lighting and doorbells using Amazon Alexa, its first use in an assisted living setting for a Scottish retirement community.

Farming continues to be important to the south of Mearns Cross and stretching to Fenwick and Eaglesham Moors. A major Bleach Works and textile finishing centre was constructed at Netherplace. The empty building was demolished in 2016 after it was the source of a major fly infestation across Newton Mearns and Clarkston. The site where the building was is visible from the M77 motorway.

== Transport ==
Traffic through the town's A77 or Ayr Road was reduced significantly after the M77 motorway extension opened in 1997. Transport links improved further in May 2006 with the opening of the Glasgow Southern Orbital dual carriageway, and its connection to the M77.

As well as minor and major roads, the town has bus links with the centre of Glasgow, Kilmarnock, and Ayr. The town is served by two local railway stations, Patterton and Whitecraigs which run trains to Glasgow Central station amongst others.

== Education ==
Mearns has nine primary schools and four high schools, including one Private school: The neighbouring town of Giffnock has the local Roman Catholic high school of St Ninians High School.

Primary schools

- Kirkhill Primary School
- St. Cadoc's RC Primary School
- St Clare's Primary School and Calderwood Lodge Primary School (shared campus)
- Crookfur Primary School
- Mearns Primary School
- Maidenhill Primary School
- Belmont House School (private school)
- Isobel Mair School for children with special needs

Secondary schools

- Eastwood High School
- Mearns Castle High School
- Belmont House School (private school)
- Isobel Mair School for children with special needs

== Religion ==
Newton Mearns has four Church of Scotland churches, a Baptist church, a Catholic church, two synagogues, and a mosque. In November 2023 the minister and "the vast majority of elders & many in the congregation of Maxwell Mearns Castle Church" ceded from Maxwell Mearns Parish Church (on theological grounds) to form Newton Mearns Free Church, in the process of affiliating with the Free Church of Scotland.

The town is home to around 25% of Scotland's entire Jewish community.

== Leisure ==
Newton Mearns contains a number of parks, including Broom/Broomburn Park, Mearns/Shawwood Park, Crookfur Park & Parklands Country Club, and the town is adjacent to Rouken Glen Park with its boating pond, gardens and leisure facilities. There are numerous golf clubs, a golf academy, a tennis club, bowling club and rugby club. A public swimming pool and leisure centre is located at Eastwood Park in nearby Giffnock, and the swimming pool and sports centre at Eastwood High School is open to the public. Between Mearns and Barrhead lie the former reservoirs and water runs of the Gorbals Water Works, pioneered in the 19th century, before the building of the Loch Katrine Water Works. The reservoirs and surrounding parklands now form the Dams to Darnley Country Park.

The biggest football clubs near Newton Mearns are Pollok F.C. (Newlands, southern Glasgow) and Arthurlie F.C. (Barrhead), both of which are members of the West of Scotland Football League having previously been among the leading clubs of the Scottish Junior Football Association, West Region. Local team (albeit playing home matches in Govan) St Cadoc's Y.C. joined the West of Scotland setup in 2020 and quickly rose through the divisions, finishing above both Pollok and Arthurlie in 2023–24. Newton Mearns also has an amateur football club, Newton Mearns Rovers AFC; Established in 1962, the club competes in the Caledonian Amateur Football League. Newton Mearns has a Freemasons' lodge, Lodge Newton Mearns No 1706, that meets in the Fairweather Hall on Barrhead Road.

== Literature ==
Newton Mearns was briefly mentioned in John McGrath's play Little Red Hen (1975, first publ. London: Pluto 1977, p. 34). More recently, the town appeared as the setting for the thriller novel Aztec Love Song (Weathervane Press 2009, ISBN 978-0-9562193-2-9) by Marty Ross, a Scottish author best known for his BBC radio plays, who grew up in the town and studied at Mearns Castle High School.
