= Paisley railway station =

Paisley railway station may refer to the closed Paisley railway station in Melbourne, or one of several railway stations in the town of Paisley, Renfrewshire, Scotland:

== Stations with Paisley in the name ==
- Paisley Abercorn railway station (closed)
- Paisley Canal railway station
- Paisley East railway station (closed)
- Paisley Gilmour Street railway station
- Paisley Hamilton Street railway station (closed)
- Paisley St James railway station
- Paisley West railway station (closed)

== Other stations in Paisley ==
- Dykebar railway station (closed)
- Ferguslie railway station (closed)
- Glenfield railway station (closed)
- Hawkhead railway station
- Potterhill railway station (closed)
- Stanely railway station (closed)
