= Balgray railway station =

Railway station in Scotland

Balgray
- Balgray Station in 2026

General information
- Location: Balgraystone Road; Barrhead, East Renfrewshire; Scotland
- Coordinates: 55.7870°N 4.3815°W
- Manager: ScotRail
- Transit authority: SPT
- Line: Cathcart Circle Lines
- Platforms: 2

History
- Opening: 27 September 2026
Location

Balgray railway station is a railway station at the south of Barrhead, Scotland. The station serves communities in the south of Barrhead (particularly Springhill and Auchenback), on the Neilston branch of the Cathcart Circle Lines. The name of the new station was chosen as the station is located next to Balgray Reservoir, part of the Dams to Darnley Country Park. It opened on 27 September 2026.

== History ==
A planned railway station, Lyoncross railway station, was partially built on the line close to the location but never opened to the public. The intended location of the station can be discerned by the widening of the tracks just east of Aurs Road between Newton Mearns and Barrhead. Another disused station, Barrhead South railway station, on the Paisley and Barrhead District Railway, was also located nearby.

In October 2023, preparatory work (outline design, ground and site investigations) took place, with the Final Business Case being submitted to City Deal Cabinet in August 2024 and approved in September 2024. The plan to open this station was announced by Network Rail on 23 November 2023. On 22 July 2025 ground was broken on the construction of the new station, and was expected to be completed and open to the public in autumn 2026. A new bus turning circle and stop have already been delivered as part of the project on Springfield Road by East Renfrewshire Council.

On 9 July 2026, Network Rail announced the railway station would open on 27 September 2026, several weeks earlier than the anticipated November schedule.

On 4 September 2026, the Office of Rail and Road granted official statutory authorisation for the station, confirming it met all safety and accessibility standards ahead of its public opening. The station opened on 27 September 2026.

The construction of the station was delivered through the Glasgow City Region city deal.

== Facilities ==
Balgray station consists of two platforms, connected by a footbridge. Lifts are also provided. Waiting shelters are provided on both platforms, with a ticket vending machine provided inside the shelter on platform 1.

The station includes:

- Bus turning circle for new bus routes.
- 80-space free car park, including 10 electric vehicle charging points and 8 accessible spaces.
- Active travel links such as park and ride, cycling routes, and bus routes.
- Direct connection to Dams to Darnley Country Park.

== Services ==
Balgray is an intermediate station on the Glasgow Central – Neilston line, served by a half-hourly service in each direction, between Glasgow Central and Neilston.

Preceding station	National Rail	Following station
Neilston	ScotRail; Cathcart Circle Lines	Patterton
