= Barrhead railway station (disambiguation) =

Barrhead railway station may refer to one of four railway stations in the town of Barrhead, Renfrewshire, Scotland:

- Barrhead railway station, on the Glasgow, Barrhead and Kilmarnock Joint Railway
- Barrhead (New) railway station, on the Paisley and Barrhead District Railway, closed
- Barrhead South railway station, on the Paisley and Barrhead District Railway, closed
- Barrhead Central railway station, on the G&SWR Barrhead Branch, closed

== See also ==
- Barrhead (disambiguation)
