= Dykebar =

Housing estate in Paisley, Renfrewshire, Scotland

Coordinates: 55°49′49″N 4°23′56″W

Dykebar is a small residential estate at the south-easternmost periphery of Paisley, Renfrewshire, Scotland, close to the local authority boundaries with both East Renfrewshire and Glasgow. It is situated next to the Hawkhead area, with other neighbourhoods in the vicinity including Thornly Park, Lochfield, Hunterhill and Blackhall. Dykebar is home to Paisley's general psychiatric hospital, and is approximately 1.2 miles (1.9 km) from both Barrhead and Nitshill.

Dykebar is a primarily residential area 1.8miles/3 km south east of Paisley off the A726. The area remained rural until after World War II. Map references to Dykebar date back from at least 1596 until after 1640.

== Dykebar Hill ==
Dykebar Hill, at 168 feet / 58 metres, is the highest point in the area. Access to the summit is possible opposite a small car park near the end of Glenapp Avenue. By 1800 the hill was Dikebar, and remained such until the start of the 20th century when the old spelling of Dykebar returned. An archaeological evaluation of the hill was undertaken in February and March 2004 on the site of proposed residential development. Evidence of a medieval defensive work, 18th-century circular landscape features and WW2 anti-aircraft defences were discovered including an intact bunker-like structure and the brick walls and concrete floors of other buildings. The battery was armed with four 3.7-inch guns.

== Dykebar Hospital ==
Dykebar Hospital opened in 1909 as the Renfrew District Lunatic Asylum. In 1948 it joined the National Health Service under the Renfrewshire Mental Hospitals Board of Management (renamed the Dykebar and Associated Hospitals Board of Management in 1964). From 1968 to 1974 it was under the Paisley and District Hospitals Board of Management. At the reorganisation of 1974 it passed to the Renfrew District of the new Argyll and Clyde Health Board. With the dissolution of the Argyll and Clyde Health Board in 2005 the hospital was transferred to NHS Greater Glasgow and Clyde.

== Transport ==
The number 66 McGills service runs from Glasgow Airport to Dykebar Hospital. Paisley and Barrhead District Railway ran through the area. Dykebar station was around 200 yards along Hawkhead Road from its junction with Barrhead Road and there was a branch into Dykebar hospital for coal deliveries. It was known locally as the Dummy Railway. It closed around 1960.
