= Renfrew Fulbar Street railway station =

Disused railway station in Renfrew, Renfrewshire

Renfrew Fulbar Street

General information
- Location: Renfrew, Renfrewshire; Scotland
- Coordinates: 55.8813°N 4.3907°W
- Grid reference: NS505679
- Platforms: 2

Other information
- Status: Disused

History
- Original company: Paisley and Renfrew Railway
- Pre-grouping: Glasgow and South Western Railway
- Post-grouping: London, Midland and Scottish Railway

Key dates
- 3 April 1837: Opened
- 5 June 1967: Closed
Location

Renfrew Fulbar Street railway station served the town of Renfrew, Renfrewshire, Scotland from 1837 to 1967 on the Paisley and Renfrew Railway.

== History ==
The first station opened on 3 April 1837 on the Paisley and Renfrew Railway. A permanent station was opened on 1 December 1865. The station closed to both passengers and goods traffic on 5 June 1967. The station building has been converted to two cottages.

Preceding station	Disused railways	Following station
South Renfrew; Line and station closed	Paisley and Renfrew Railway	Renfrew Wharf; Line and station closed
