= South Renfrew railway station =

Disused railway station in Renfrew, Renfrewshire

South Renfrew

General information
- Location: Renfrew, Renfrewshire; Scotland
- Coordinates: 55.8729°N 4.4044°W
- Grid reference: NS496670
- Platforms: 2

Other information
- Status: Disused

History
- Original company: Glasgow and South Western Railway
- Pre-grouping: Glasgow and South Western Railway
- Post-grouping: London, Midland and Scottish Railway; British Rail (Scottish Region)

Key dates
- 19 April 1897: Opened
- 5 June 1967: Closed
Location

South Renfrew railway station, also known as Renfrew South railway station, served the Renfrew, Renfrewshire, Scotland, from 1897 to 1967 on the Paisley and Renfrew Railway.

== History ==
The station opened on 19 April 1897 by the Glasgow and South Western Railway. To the west was Renfrew Steel Works and to the east was Albert Cabinet Works. The steel works were served by a signal box called Porterfield, which was to the south and it opened before the station. Two replacement signal boxes were built when the station opened, which were named 'South Renfrew No 1' and 'South Renfrew No 2'. Also to the south was a yard which served the sidings for the works. The station closed on 5 June 1967.

Preceding station	Historical railways	Following station
Renfrew Fulbar Street; Line and station closed	Paisley and Renfrew Railway	Sandyford Halt; Line and station closed
