= Sandyford Halt railway station =

Disused railway station in Paisley, Renfrewshire

Coordinates: 55.8661°N 4.4153°W

Sandyford

General information
- Location: Paisley, Renfrewshire; Scotland
- Platforms: 1

Other information
- Status: Disused

History
- Original company: Glasgow and South Western Railway
- Pre-grouping: Glasgow and South Western Railway
- Post-grouping: London, Midland and Scottish Railway; British Rail (Scottish Region)

Key dates
- 1914: Opened privately as Sandyford Platform
- June 1952: Name changed to Sandyford Halt
- 18 April 1966: Opened to the public
- 5 June 1967: Closed
Location

Sandyford railway station served the town of Paisley, Renfrewshire, Scotland, from 1914 to 1967 on the Paisley and Renfrew Railway.

== History ==
The station opened as Sandyford Platform in 1914 by the Glasgow and South Western Railway. It was only available to the workers of Ogston and Tennant's Renfrew Mill, which had sidings to the east. There were more sidings to the south near Sandyford Signal Box, which opened in 1911 and closed in 1936. The station's name changed to Sandyford Halt in June 1952. It opened to the public on 18 April 1966, although it was short-lived, closing a year later on 5 June 1967.

Preceding station	Disused railways	Following station
South Renfrew; Line and station closed	Paisley and Renfrew Railway	Paisley Abercorn; Line and station closed
