= Barrhead South railway station =

Future railway station in Scotland

Barrhead South

General information
- Location: Barrhead, Renfrewshire; Scotland
- Coordinates: 55.795°N 4.401°W

Other information
- Status: Disused

History
- Original company: Paisley and Barrhead District Railway
- Pre-grouping: Caledonian Railway

Key dates
- 1897: Built but never opened
Location

Barrhead South was once one of four railway stations in Barrhead, Renfrewshire (now East Renfrewshire), Scotland.

A new station, Balgray railway station, has been approved, near the site of the old Barrhead South station, by Network Rail in conjunction with East Renfrewshire Council. This station has a Spring 2024 construction start with opening planned for Summer/Autumn 2025. The new station will be located off Balgraystone Road. The road network leading to the new station is now complete.

== History ==
The station was originally planned as part of the Paisley and Barrhead District Railway (P&BDR) and the Lanarkshire and Ayrshire Railway. The P&BDR line opened for freight traffic in 1905, but none of its stations, including this proposed site, were ever opened for passenger service due to intense competition from local tramways and buses.

Situated in the hills south of Barrhead, it was designed as the only side-platform station on the line. Although passenger services never commenced, the site saw freight activity, as evidenced by historic goods wagons documented in the area.

In the 2020s, with extensive residential expansion underway in Barrhead South, Network Rail and East Renfrewshire Council constructed a new railway station near the original site named Balgray railway station. Located on the Neilston branch, the station serves both the new housing developments and the nearby Dams to Darnley Country Park.

Preceding station	Historical railways	Following station
Lyoncross; Line closed; station never constructed	Caledonian Railway; Paisley and Barrhead District Railway	Barrhead (New); Line and station closed
