= Darnley Lime Works Tramway and Mineral Railway =

Railway in Glasgow, United Kingdom

Coordinates: 55.806958°N 4.348215°W

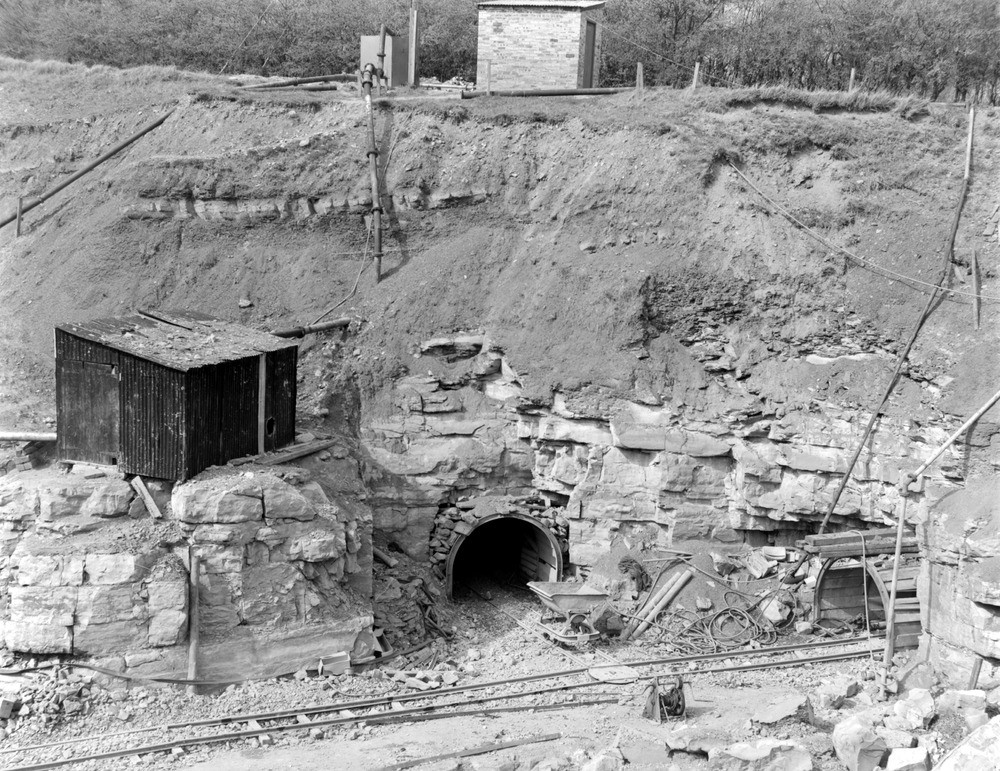
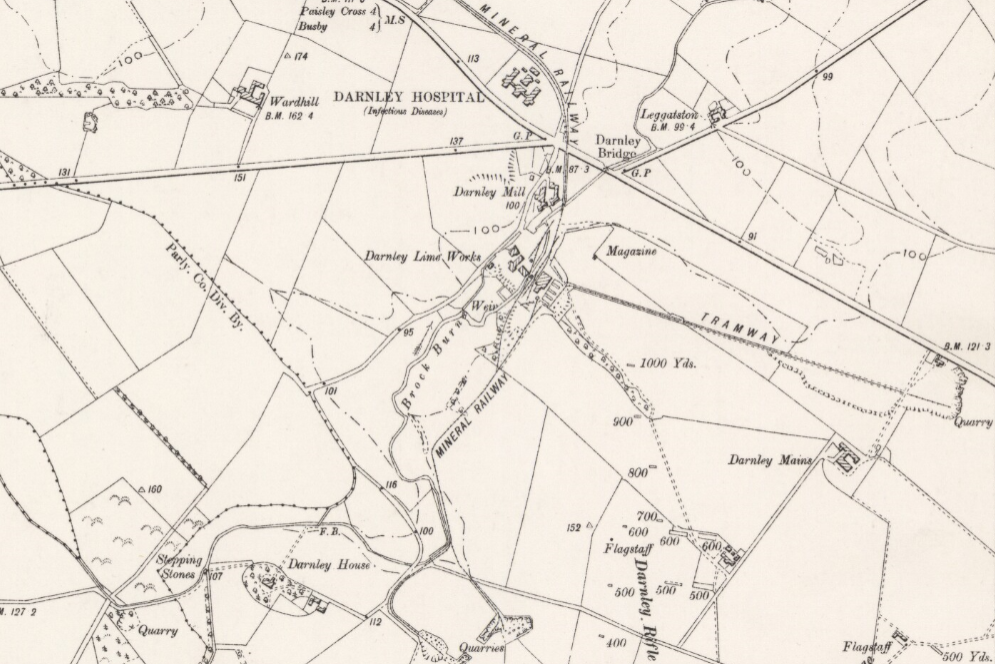
- Darnley Quarry, 1959 Darnley Lime Works on 2nd edition Ordnance Survey map, 1898.

Technical
- Track gauge: Probably 2 ft (610 mm) and probably 1,435 mm (4 ft 8 1/2 in)

The Darnley Lime Works Tramway and Mineral Railway consisted of a narrow gauge field railway and probably a standard gauge works railway at today's Dams to Darnley Country Park in East Renfrewshire, 9.7 km southwest of Glasgow. They were successively operated at least from 1898 to 1959.

== History ==
=== First mines ===
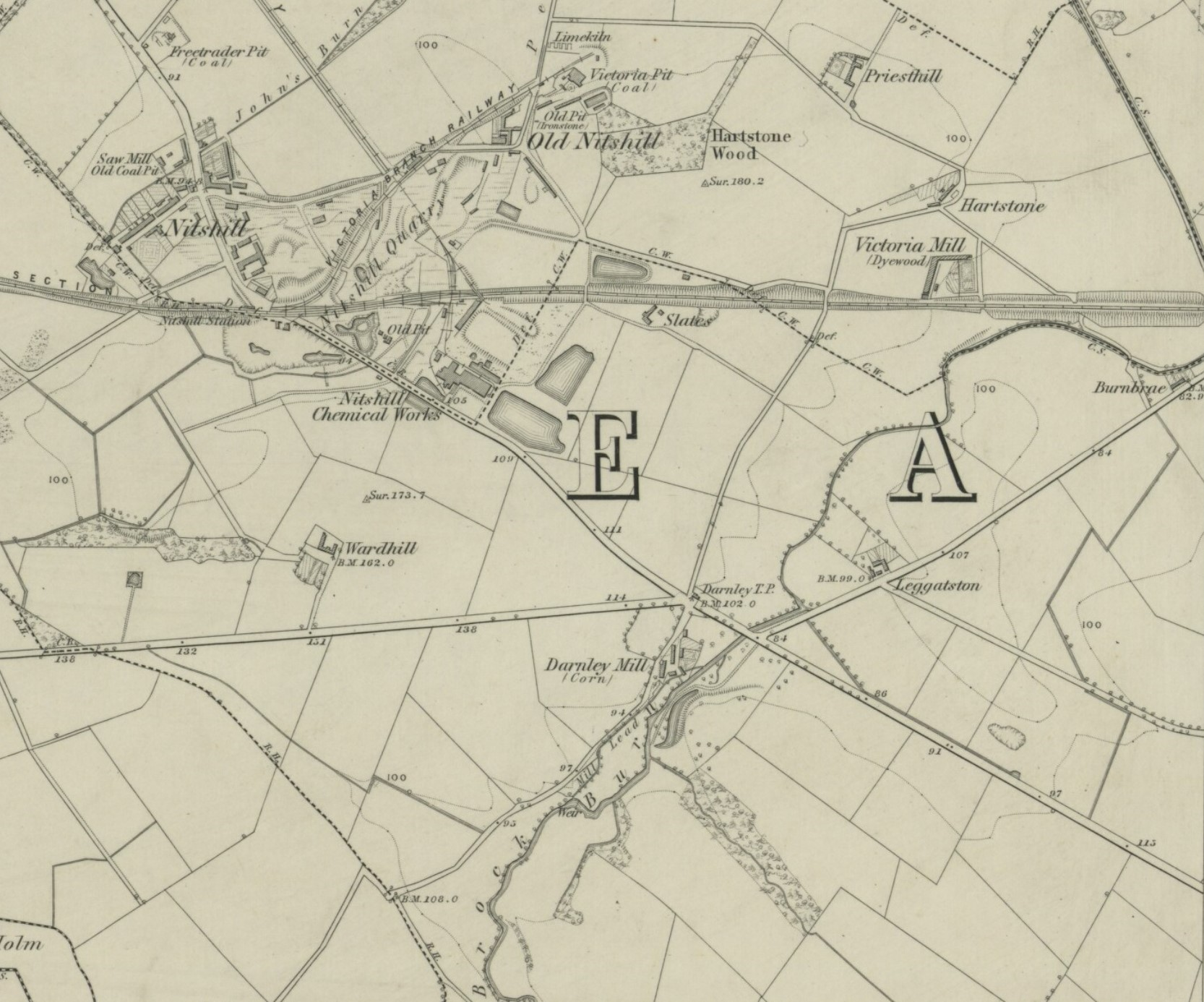
Darnley Mill (Corn), 1864

Mining was conducted in the Darnley area since 1610, as evidenced by a lease agreement between Sir John Maxwell, John Hall and George Stephenson, which is archived together with the Pollock Estate Papers. In it, Stevenson acquired the rights to mine limestone at Over Darnley. As early as 1615 coal was mined, as evidenced by a contract between Robert Milne and Sir John Maxwell in April 1615.

Old maps show how extensive mining was in different places in the area. A map drawn by John Ainslie from 1800 shows limestone quarries close to Darnley Mill east of Brock Burn and two above Upper Darnley.

=== Tramway ===
The second edition of the Ordnance Survey map (1896–1899) shows the quarry picked up by Ainslie on the site of today's interchange No. 3 of the M77 motorway, from which the Tramway ran to the limestone kilns of Darnley Lime Works east of Brock Burn, located just south of today's World Buffet restaurant at the junction of Corselet Road and Nitshill Road.

=== Mineral Railway ===
The Mineral Railway was probably a standard gauge works railway. It was already marked on Ainslie's map and led from the lime works south to the quarries south of today's Southpark Village. Another quarry was west of the spot where Aurs Burn merges into Brock Burn.

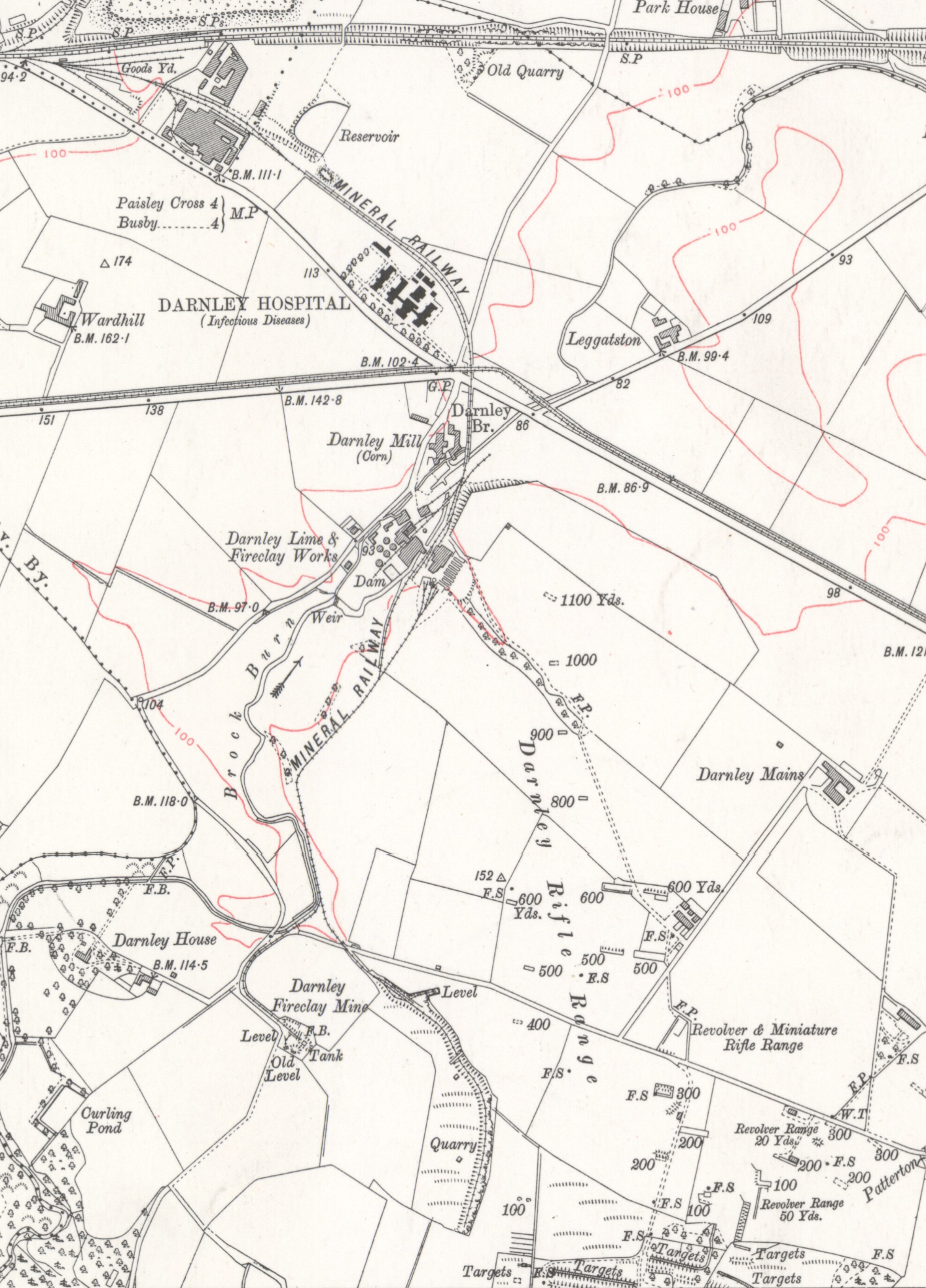
Darnsley Mill und Darnsley Lime & Fireclay Works, 1915

The 1914–1915 map shows a significant increase in mining and quarry activities within the area. West of the Brock Burn, several field railways can be seen that run from the Waulkmill Mine at Waulkmill Glen to the cement works north of North Brae Farm. The quarries south of Southpark Village are now referred to as the Darnley Fireclay Mine and the lime works are now called Darnley Lime and Fireclay Works.

=== Fire clay ===
The fire clay laid in up to two meters thick seams under the limestone and were mined at different times, especially around 1900. Big ovens were used to make bricks, pipes and sanitary ware. The Tramway seems to have been taken out of service, because the quarry, which it once served, is recorded on the map as an old quarry. In the late 1930s, the Darnley Fireclay mine was referred to as Upper Darnley Quarry and the lime cabins in Darnley as Arden Lime Works.

=== Limestone ===
While part of the limestone was used as fertilizer lime for agricultural improvement in the eighteenth century, the Darnley lime was mainly used for the production of bricks for the construction of residential buildings, for example on the Williamwood Estate. Other, later applications included road construction and its sealing properties were recognized and used more frequently. The lime was transported all over the country and became one of the most commonly used building materials in Britain, which appeared in British Standards until the 1950s.

=== Landfill and park ===
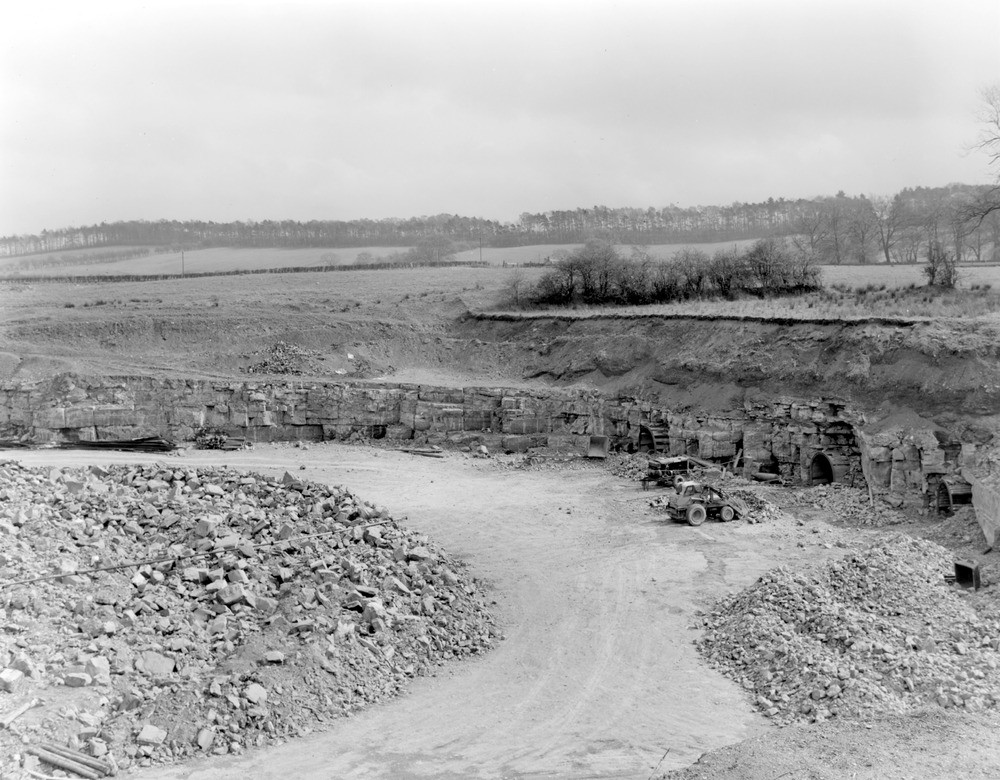
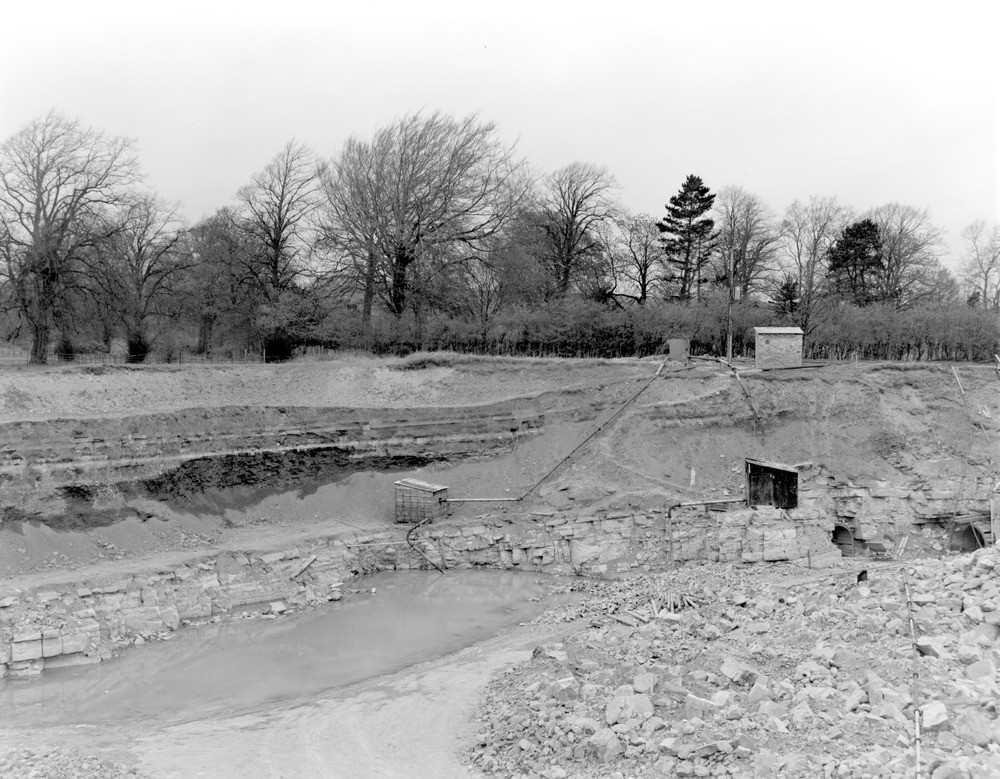
Darnley Quarry, 1959

Mining was practiced in this area until the late 1950s or early 1960s. Then the old quarries were used as landfills. The biggest landfill site lies to the east and west of Corselet Road. It extends beyond the landscaped park towards the B & Q hardware store. The areas where the land was refilled appear coarse and hilly, with rugged, mossy vegetation. In some areas, there have been obvious subsidence and there are deposits from the ground, including bricks, metal and rubble. Elsewhere, the landfill is adjacent to unsettled, higher-quality land. The edges, where the land has not been landscaped, are still visible in the Dams to Darnley Country Park.
