= Barrhead (disambiguation) =

Barrhead is a town in East Renfrewshire, Scotland, UK

Barrhead may also refer to:

== Canada ==
- Barrhead, Alberta, a town
- County of Barrhead No. 11, a municipal district in Alberta
- Barrhead Airport, County of Barrhead, Alberta
- Barrhead (electoral district), Alberta; a provincial electoral district

== United Kingdom ==
- Barrhead railway station, Barrhead, Scotland
- Barrhead Branch, a branch line of the Glasgow and South Western Railway in Scotland
- Barrhead High School, East Renfrewshire, Scotland

== See also ==
- Barrhead railway station (disambiguation)
- Paisley and Barrhead District Railway, Scotland, UK
- Glasgow, Barrhead and Kilmarnock Joint Railway, Scotland, UK
- Barrhead-Westlock, Alberta, Canada; a provincial electoral district
- Athabasca-Barrhead-Westlock, Alberta, Canada; a provincial electoral district
- Barrhead-Morinville-Westlock, Alberta, Canada; a provincial electoral district
- Barrhead, Liboside & Uplawmoor (ward), East Renfrewshire, Scotland, UK; a municipal ward
- Barhead (disambiguation)
