= Paisley Hamilton Street railway station =

Former railway station in Scotland

Paisley Hamilton Street

General information
- Location: Paisley, Renfrewshire; Scotland
- Coordinates: 55.850°N 4.421°W
- Platforms: 2

Other information
- Status: Disused

History
- Original company: Paisley and Renfrew Railway
- Pre-grouping: Glasgow & South Western

Key dates
- 3 April 1837: Opened, with loco haulage
- July 1835: Leased to tenant
- 31 July 1852: Bought by G&SWR
- 23 January 1866: Services suspended for line doubling and re-gauging
- 1 February 1866: Station Closed
Location

Paisley (Hamilton Street) railway station was an early railway station in Paisley, Renfrewshire, Scotland. It was built in 1837 by the Paisley and Renfrew Railway; and, together with the station at Renfrew Wharf, was one of two terminal stations on the line. Both stations offered passengers and goods facilities.

== History ==
The station opened on 3 April 1837, with steam locomotive haulage on the 4 ft 6 in (1,372 mm) gauge, (Scotch gauge) line. The intention was to both supplement and complete with passenger and goods services on the River Cart between Paisley and Renfrew.

The station was entered through either carriage or foot-gates. These led to a booking office, with a passenger waiting room behind it; the upper floor, above, was reserved for the use of the manager. Behind this was the Train shed, which had two platforms running the whole length of the shed. There was a separate locomotive shed; and a goods warehouse, which had one railway line running through it.

During the summer months there was a half-hourly service, the journey took 12 minutes, with ten journeys in each direction per day.

In 1842, to save money, the steam locomotive was replaced by horse haulage.

== Closure ==
On 23 January 1866, train services were suspended on the line to enable the tracks to be doubled throughout; the line to be converted to Standard Gauge and for it to be connected to the Glasgow and Paisley Joint Railway, at Arkleston Junction.

Paisley Hamilton Street station closed on 1 February 1866; it was replaced by the Glasgow and South Western Railway's Paisley Abercorn station, when the line reopened on 1 May 1866.

The station is shown on an Ordnance Survey map of 1923, still with tracks in situ; it is marked as a goods station.

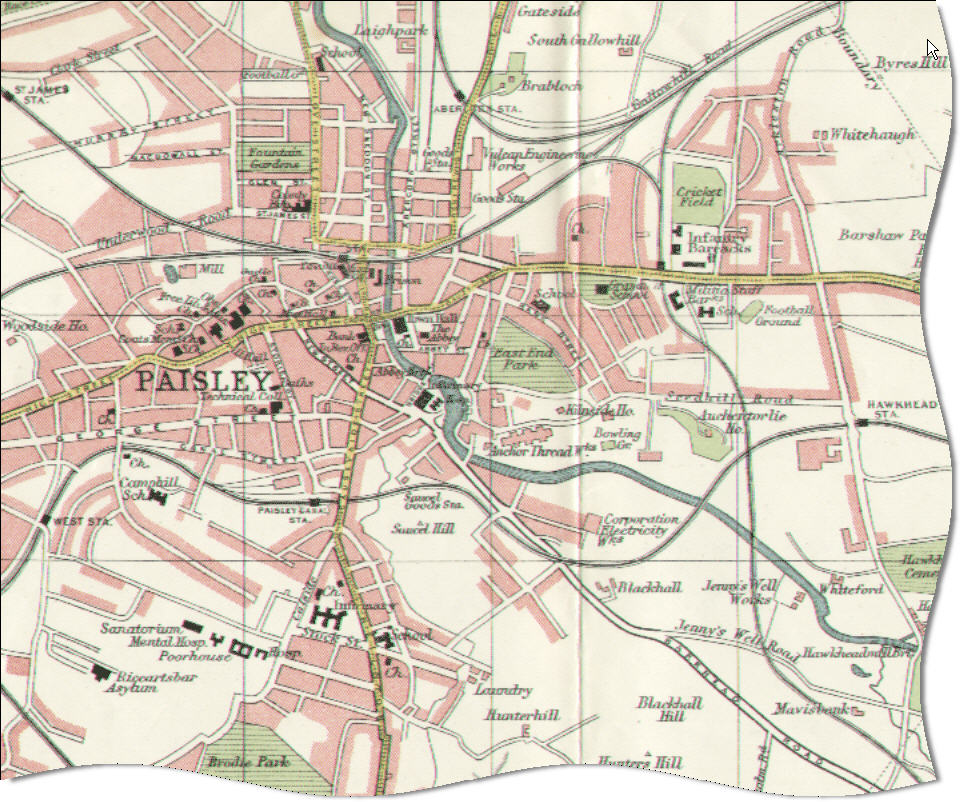
Paisley Hamilton Street Station apparently still in use, for goods in 1923

Preceding station	Historical railways	Following station
Renfrew Wharf; Line and station closed	Glasgow and South Western Railway; Paisley and Renfrew Railway	Terminus
