= Barhead =

Barhead may refer to:

- Barhead, Ontario, a place in Canada
- Barhead spinefoot, or Siganus virgatus, a fish
- Barhead pipefish, a fish of genus Microphis

== See also ==
- Bar-headed goose (Anser indicus)
- Barrhead (disambiguation)
