= Renfrew Wharf railway station =

Disused railway station in Renfrew, Renfrewshire

Renfrew Wharf

General information
- Location: Renfrew, Renfrewshire; Scotland
- Coordinates: 55.8867°N 4.3855°W
- Grid reference: NS508685
- Platforms: 1

Other information
- Status: Disused

History
- Original company: Paisley and Renfrew Railway
- Pre-grouping: Glasgow and South Western Railway
- Post-grouping: London, Midland and Scottish Railway

Key dates
- 3 April 1837: Opened as Renfrew
- 1 February 1866: Closed
- 1 May 1866: Reopened and name changed to Renfrew Wharf
- 5 June 1967: Closed
Location

Renfrew Wharf railway station served the town of Renfrew, Renfrewshire, Scotland, from 1837 to 1967 on the Paisley and Renfrew Railway.

== History ==
The station opened as Renfrew on 3 April 1837 by the Paisley and Renfrew Railway. It closed on 1 February 1866 but reopened on 1 May 1866, the same day that Renfrew Fulbar Street opened. This station's name was changed to Renfrew Wharf to avoid confusion between the two. To the south was the signal box and Meadowside Junction. Several sidings served different works, one being London Works, which had a siding that ran to Renfrew Ferry. The station closed on 5 June 1967.

Preceding station	Disused railways	Following station
Terminus	Paisley and Renfrew Railway	Renfrew Fulbar Street; Line and station closed
