= Dykebar railway station =

Railway station in Renfrewshire, Scotland

Coordinates: 55.8320°N 4.3949°W

Dykebar
- Dykebar Station in 1960

General information
- Location: Paisley, Renfrewshire; Scotland
- Platforms: 2

Other information
- Status: Disused

History
- Pre-grouping: Paisley and Barrhead District Railway

Key dates
- 1897: Built but never opened for passengers
Location

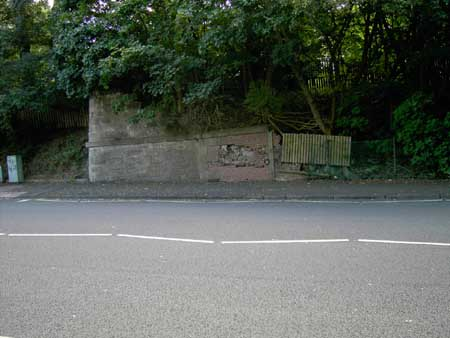
The remains of a bridge can still be seen at the pedestrian crossing at that location (next to the entrance of Dobbie's Garden Centre).

Dykebar was a railway station in the Dykebar area to the south of Paisley, Renfrewshire, Scotland. The station was originally part of the Paisley and Barrhead District Railway . The line was opened in 1897 and used by coal trains until the 1960s but none of the stations including this one opened for passenger travel.

It was situated on the east boundary of what are now the grounds of St Andrews school around 200 yards along Hawkhead Road from its junction with Barrhead Road. The station was converted to a two-room and kitchen house before being dismantled by vandals in the late 1960s. The line through Dykebar from Blackbyres to Paisley East goods closed on 31 December 1960.

Railway photographer Norris Forrest visited the area in February 1960 taking pictures of the station platform, a passenger shelter and a train. By observing Ross House (which is still there) behind the shelter it is possible to pinpoint the original position of the station. There is no sign of the concrete platform today, the only structure on the site being a wall. Other railway artifacts can be seen on the satellite image in the adjoining field including a bridge which would have taken trains into Hawkhead Hospital. St. Andrews school is in the background.

== Notes ==
The Norris Forrest photographs are the copyright of the Great North of Scotland Railway Association.

Preceding station	Historical railways	Following station
Barrhead (New); Line and station closed	Caledonian Railway; Paisley and Barrhead District Railway	Paisley East; Line and station closed
