= Glenfield railway station (Scotland) =

Train station in Scotland

Glenfield
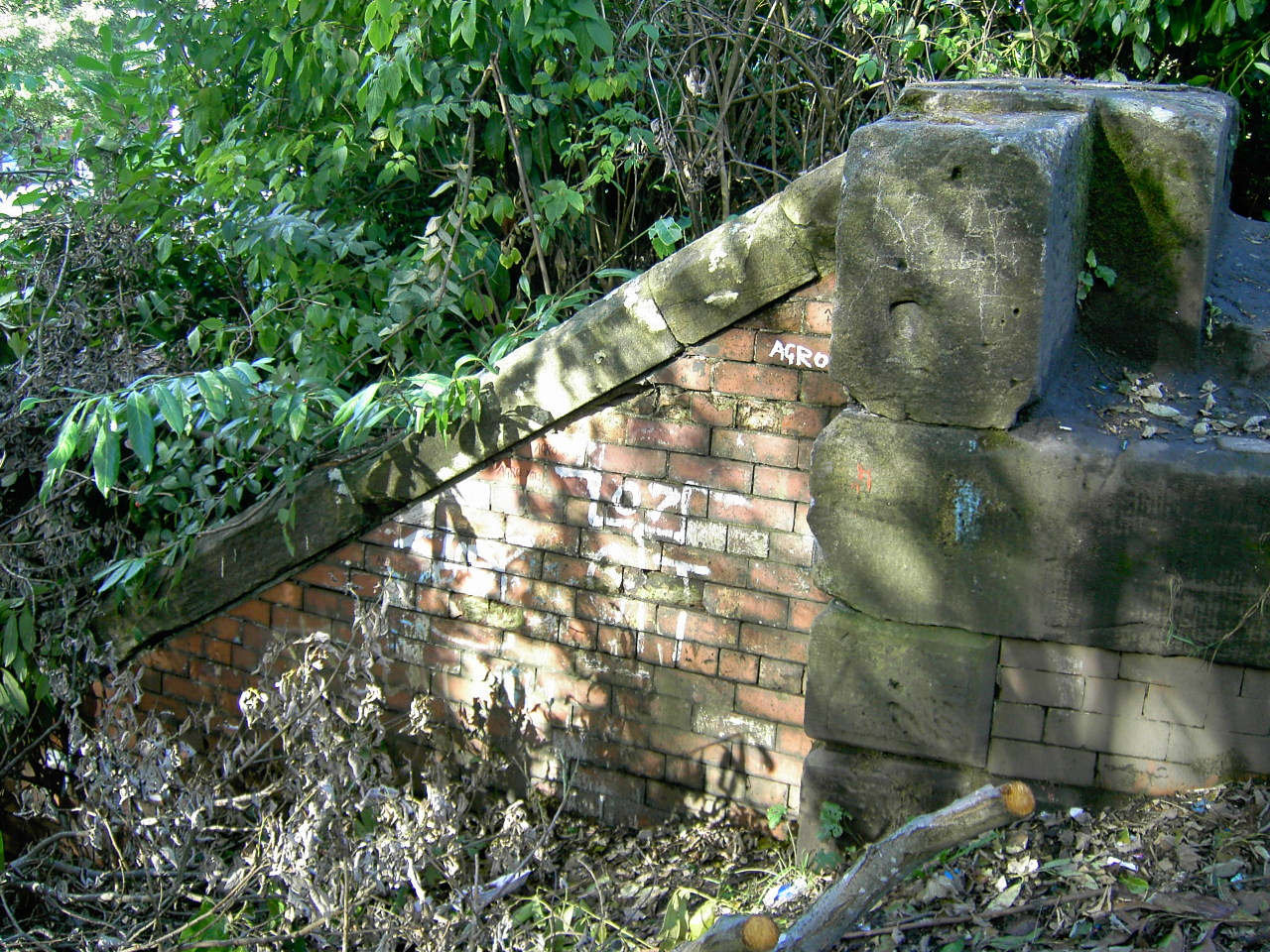
- Base of bridge crossing the station platform 2007

General information
- Location: Paisley, Renfrewshire; Scotland
- Coordinates: 55.819°N 4.434°W
- Grid reference: NS475611

Other information
- Status: Disused

History
- Original company: Paisley and Barrhead District Railway
- Pre-grouping: Caledonian Railway

Key dates
- 1897: Built
- 1897: Never opened for passengers
Location

Glenfield was a railway station to the south west of Paisley, Renfrewshire, Scotland.

== History ==
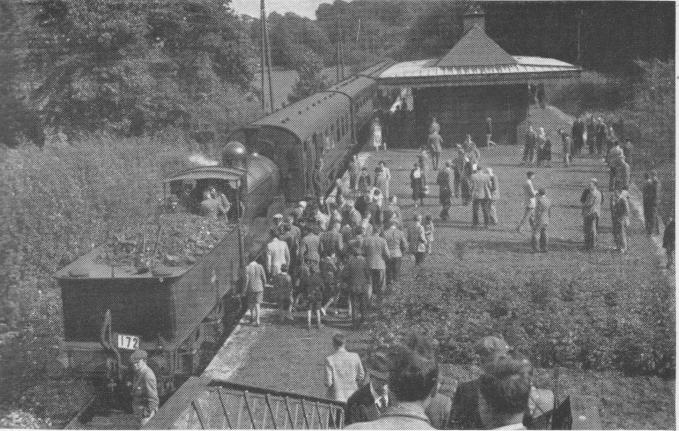
Stephenson Locomotive Society's tour of the Paisley district on 1 September 1951

The station was originally part of the Paisley and Barrhead District Railway. The line was opened in 1897 and used for freight until the 1960s, but none of its stations - including this one - opened for passenger travel. It was on the west side of the present-day Glenburn Road, opposite Knockside Avenue. It is easy to find the long concrete platform by walking into the trees at the above location. Railway photographer G.H. Robin took three pictures there, two of which during the only time passengers disembarked at Glenfield on an excursion for railway enthusiasts in September 1951. The station was later rented out as a private house while goods trains were still using the line. The photograph shows the excursion train and the tenant's vegetable garden.

Preceding station	Historical railways	Following station
Barrhead (New); Line and station closed	Caledonian Railway; Paisley and Barrhead District Railway	Stanely; Line and station closed
