= Ferguslie railway station =

Disused railway station in Renfrewshire, Scotland

Ferguslie
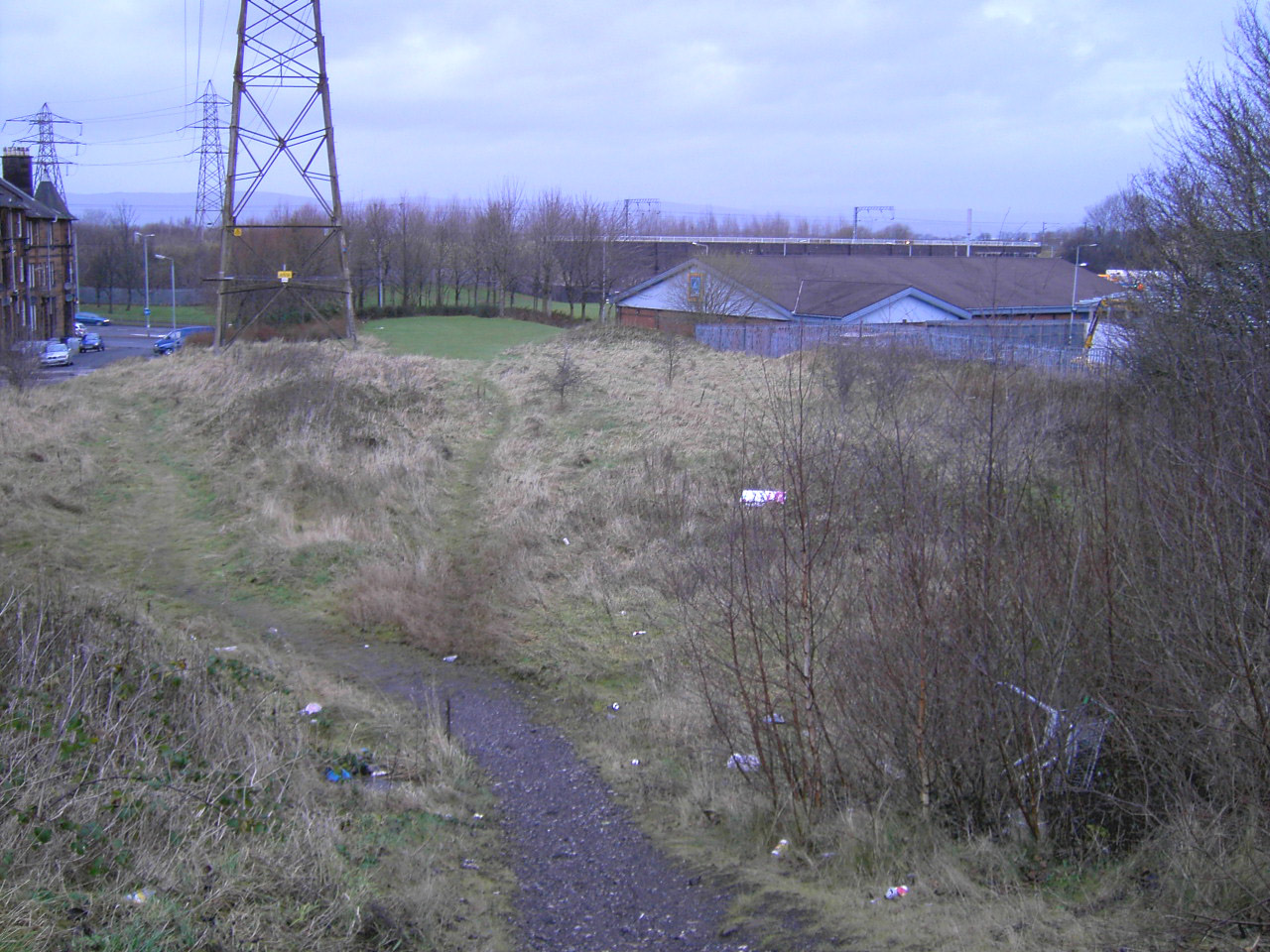
- Site of former Ferguslie station. Aldi shop is on the right, Newton Terrace on the left. The main Glasgow to Ayr railway can be seen in the background. The photograph was taken from the national cycle track, formerly the Paisley Canal line which ran above the station. The bridge has been filled in.

General information
- Location: Paisley, Renfrewshire; Scotland
- Coordinates: 55.838°N 4.464°W
- Grid reference: NS457633
- Platforms: 2

Other information
- Status: Disused

History
- Original company: Paisley and Barrhead District Railway

Key dates
- 1897: Built but never opened for passengers
Location

Ferguslie was a railway station to the west of Paisley, Renfrewshire, Scotland. It was constructed as a planned extension of railway passenger services in the Paisley area by the Paisley and Barrhead District Railway, which opened in 1897, but none of the stations opened for passengers. The line was only used for freight services and closed in the 1960s. The track has been lifted and the station buildings removed.

== History ==
The station was originally part of the Paisley and Barrhead District Railway. The line was opened in 1897 and used for freight until the 1960s but none of the stations including this one opened for passenger travel. It was situated about 100 yards south of the main A761 Paisley to Elderslie road between the Aldi shop at Fulbar Road and Newton Terrace.

Railway photographers Norris Forrest and GH Robin took pictures in the vicinity of the station.

Preceding station	Historical railways	Following station
Stanely; Line and station closed	Caledonian Railway; Paisley and Barrhead District Railway	Paisley St James; Line closed; station open

== Notes ==
The Norris Forrest photographs are the copyright of the Great North of Scotland Railway Association. The GH Robin photographs are the copyright of the Mitchell Library, Glasgow.
