= Paisley East railway station =

Railway station in Scotland

Paisley East
- Paisley East station in the early 1920s

General information
- Location: Paisley, Renfrewshire; Scotland
- Coordinates: 55.847015°N 4.408441°W
- Grid reference: NS493641

Other information
- Status: Disused

History
- Original company: Paisley and Barrhead District Railway

Key dates
- 1897: Built but never opened for passengers
Location

Paisley East was an unopened railway station in Paisley, Renfrewshire, Scotland.

== History ==
The station was originally part of the Paisley and Barrhead District Railway. The line was opened in 1897 and used for freight until the 1960s but none of the stations opened for passenger travel.

As can be seen on the linked map, it was situated on the north side of Glasgow Road on the site of what became the Kelburn cinema, now the Kelburn Retirement Flats near the Sherwood Church. From the station to Seedhill Road, the line ran down Lacy Street along a very high wall. The station was first turned into a garage then demolished in 1928. However, the branch continued into Paisley East goods at Cecil Street crossing Lacy Street at street level. The branch from Blackbyres junction to Paisley East goods closed on 31 December 1960.

The location of the station and the goods yard can be fixed today (as of 2009) because John Lyon's coal shop was still there (at 52 Glasgow Road) with a lion sculpture above the entrance. The shop is now a hairdresser's salon. The station was directly opposite at the other side of Glasgow Road.

A rail tour operated by the Stephenson Locomotive Society on 1 September 1951. started at Paisley East Goods at Cecil Street and made its way to Barrhead South.

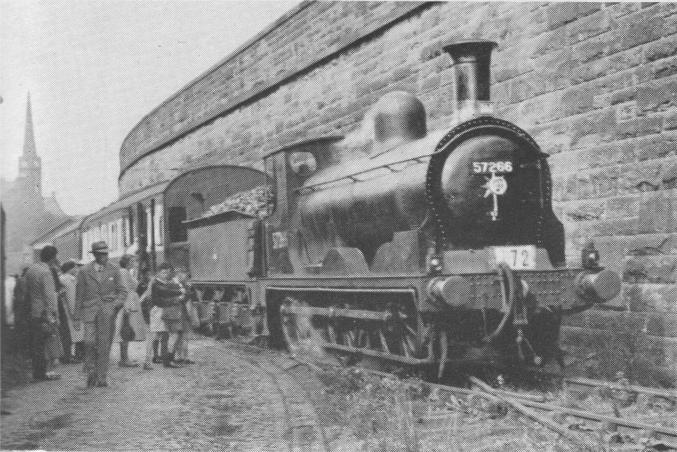
ex-Caledonian Railway 0-6-0 No. 57266 at Paisley East Mineral Depot

Preceding station	Historical railways	Following station
Dykebar; Line and station closed	Caledonian Railway; Paisley and Barrhead District Railway	Paisley Gilmour Street; Line never completed; Station open
