= Stanely railway station =

Railway station in Renfrewshire, Scotland

Stanely
- Guide to the position of Stanely station and the lines to Glenfield and Ferguslie

General information
- Location: Paisley, Renfrewshire; Scotland
- Coordinates: 55.822°N 4.455°W
- Grid reference: NS463615

Other information
- Status: Disused

History
- Original company: Paisley and Barrhead District Railway

Key dates
- 1897: Built but never opened for passengers
Location

Stanely was a railway station to the west of Paisley, Renfrewshire, Scotland.

== History ==
The station was originally part of the Paisley and Barrhead District Railway. The line was opened in 1897 and used for freight until the 1960s but none of the stations including this one opened for passenger travel. It was located directly to the south (toward the Gleniffer braes) of the castle in Stanely Dam. The line ran along the edge of the dam to Glenfield. The platform was the same long concrete island design as the other Paisley and Barrhead District Railway stations.

Preceding station	Historical railways	Following station
Glenfield; Line and station closed	Caledonian Railway; Paisley and Barrhead District Railway	Ferguslie; Line and station closed
