= Paisley Abercorn railway station =

Former railway station in Scotland

Paisley Abercorn
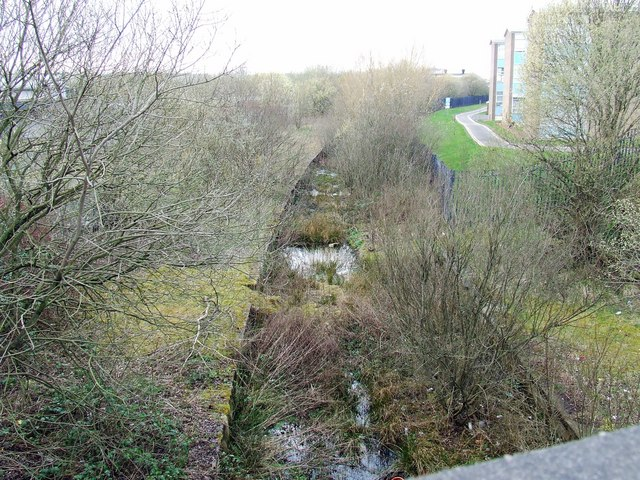
- The station site in 2007

General information
- Location: Paisley, Renfrewshire; Scotland
- Coordinates: 55.8519°N 4.4190°W
- Platforms: 2

Other information
- Status: Disused

History
- Original company: Paisley and Renfrew Railway
- Pre-grouping: Glasgow & South Western

Key dates
- 1 May 1866: Opened as Paisley G&SW
- 2 January 1880: Renamed Paisley Abercorn
- 5 June 1967: Closed
Location

Paisley Abercorn railway station was a railway station in Paisley, Renfrewshire, Scotland. The station was built by the Glasgow and South Western railway when the former Scotch gauge Paisley and Renfrew Railway was converted to Standard Gauge and was joined to the Glasgow and Paisley Joint Railway at Arkleston Junction.

== History ==
The station opened on 1 May 1866, it replaced the earlier terminal station at Paisley Hamilton Street.

The station closed permanently to regular passenger services on 5 June 1967, when passenger services were withdrawn from the branch line. Freight traffic ceased in 1981 and the track was lifted in 1986.

The platform's as of 2026 have been filled in and replaced with a newly laid cycle track. However, the platform closest to West College Scotland can just barely be made out.

The site of the former Paisley Abercorn railway station goods yard was used to build a DIY superstore operated by Tesco in the late 1970s - unlike most Tesco stores, for most of its life it was forbidden to sell food. In the 1980s the store was sold to become a DIY superstore - "Great Mills"; Great Mills has changed ownership and has since been renamed and eventually demolished in 2012. As of 2026 the site is home to a Starbucks, PureGym, Greggs & B&M.

Preceding station	Historical railways	Following station
Sandyford Halt; Line and station closed	Glasgow and South Western Railway; Paisley and Renfrew Railway	Cardonald; Line closed, station open
