= Barrhead New railway station =

Disused railway station in Renfrewshire, Scotland

Barrhead New
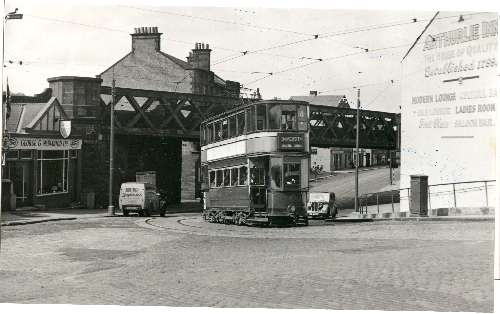
- The station was immediately behind the Arthurlie Inn in the photograph. Barrhead New Station was in fact adjacent to Barrhead Central Station on Mill Road

General information
- Location: Barrhead, Renfrewshire; Scotland
- Coordinates: 55.800°N 4.396°W
- Grid reference: NS498589

Other information
- Status: Disused

History
- Original company: Paisley and Barrhead District Railway
- Pre-grouping: Caledonian Railway

Key dates
- 1897: Built but never opened for passengers
Location

Barrhead New was one of four railway stations in Barrhead, Renfrewshire, Scotland.

== History ==
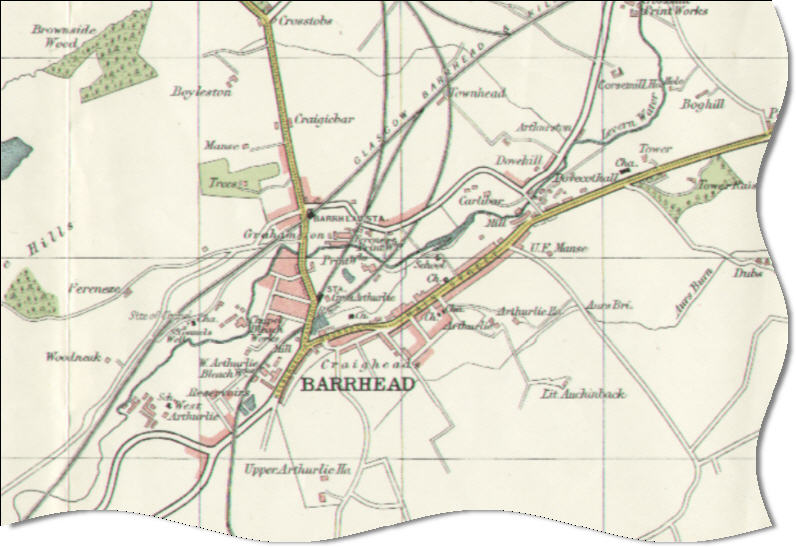
1923 map. Barrhead New is close to the junction of the two yellow roads.

The station was originally part of the Paisley and Barrhead District Railway. The line was opened in 1897 and used for freight until the 1960s but none of the stations including this one opened for passenger travel.

It was adjacent to the Arthurlie Inn (shown with railway bridge on picture) in Cross Arthurlie Street and described as a grand building, a towering edifice with its name picked out in metal letters attached to metal strips. It might have passed as a picture house.

Preceding station	Historical railways	Following station
Barrhead South; Line and station closed	Caledonian Railway; Paisley and Barrhead District Railway	Glenfield; Line and station closed
Barrhead South; Line and station closed	Caledonian Railway; Paisley and Barrhead District Railway	Dykebar; Line and station closed
