= Dykebar Hospital =

- NHS Greater Glasgow and Clyde
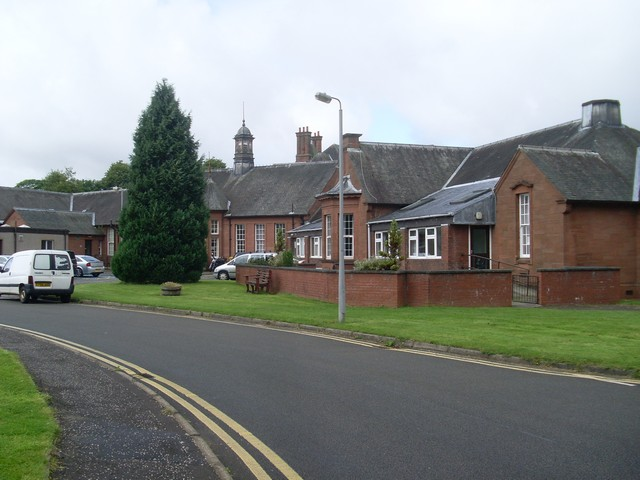
- Dykebar Hospital

- Shown in Renfrewshire

Geography
- Location: Paisley, Renfrewshire, Scotland
- Coordinates: 55.8242°N 4.4014°W

Organisation
- Care system: NHS Scotland
- Type: Psychiatric hospital

Services
- Emergency department: No

History
- Founded: 1909

Links
- Website: Dykebar Hospital
- Lists: Hospitals in Scotland

Dykebar Hospital is a mental health facility in Dykebar, Paisley, Renfrewshire, Scotland. The main building is a Grade B listed building. The hospital is managed by NHS Greater Glasgow and Clyde.

== History ==
The hospital, which was designed by Thomas Graham Abercrombie in the Scottish Baroque style, opened as the Renfrew District Asylum in 1909. Two further villas and a nurses' home were completed in 1914 and it served as a military hospital during the closing stages of the First World War. It became Dykebar Mental Hospital in the 1920s and joined the National Health Service as Dykebar Hospital in 1948. A major extension for geriatric patients was added in 1975.

Three historic wards at a Paisley Hospital have been placed on an at-risk register. Wards 20, 22, 23, at Dykebar Hospital are cited in the Buildings at Risk Bulletin published by the Scottish Civic Trust on behalf of conservation body Historic Scotland. Also on the at-risk list is Mid Dykebar, a large red sandstone building within the grounds of the hospital. Ward 22 - formerly known as Villa 2 - is vacant and has been the target of vandals for some time.

The remaining two wards - before the new hospital was built in the mid-Seventies ward 20 was known as Villa 1 and ward 23 Villa 5 - are also vacant and boarded up. All four buildings were built in 1909 by Abercrombie. Mid Dykebar was built to house the superintendent of the hospital, which was then Renfrew District Asylum. A notable feature of the building is that the east entrance is unusual in having large areas of walling without windows.

== See also ==
- List of listed buildings in Paisley, Renfrewshire
