= Lyoncross railway station =

Proposed railway station in Scotland

Lyoncross
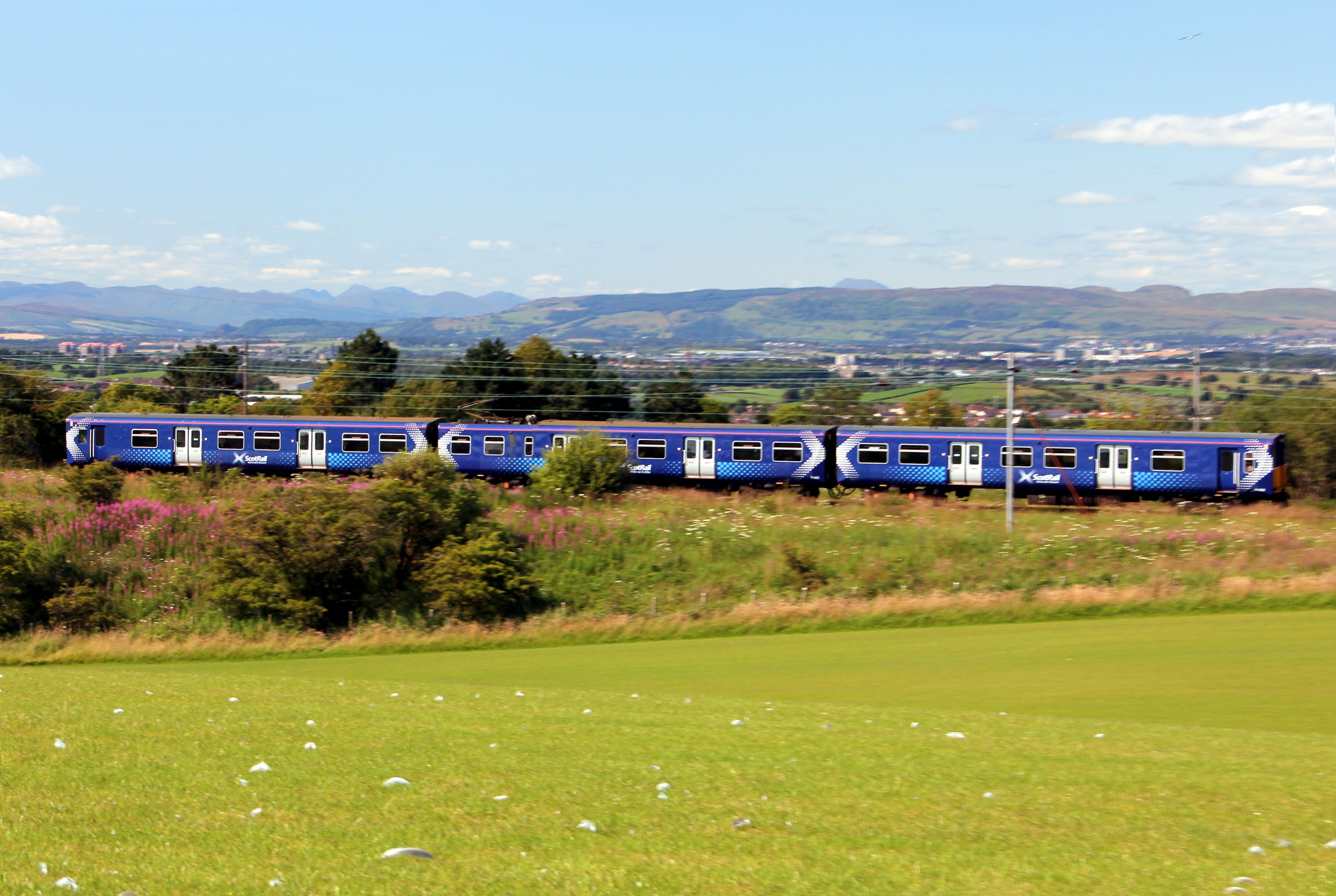
- Class 314 314212 passing the site of Lyoncross

General information
- Location: Between Newton Mearns and Barrhead, Renfrewshire; Scotland
- Coordinates: 55.789685°N 4.371850°W
- Platforms: None opened

Other information
- Status: Disused

History
- Original company: Lanarkshire and Ayrshire Railway
- Pre-grouping: Caledonian Railway
Location

Lyoncross railway station was intended to be a railway station between the towns of Newton Mearns and Barrhead, Scotland as part of the Lanarkshire and Ayrshire Railway.

== History ==
The station was never finished or opened to passengers. Its location was close to the junction between the Lanarkshire and Ayrshire Railway and the Paisley and Barrhead District Railway near Balgray Reservoir. The former L&AR line here is still open on the Neilston branch of the Cathcart Circle Line.

The location of the station can be discerned by the widening of the tracks just east of Aurs Road between Newton Mearns and Barrhead. The section of track between Barrhead South and Lyoncross was never used.

Preceding station	Historical railways	Following station
Neilston; Line and station open	Caledonian Railway; Lanarkshire and Ayrshire Railway	Patterton; Line and station open
Barrhead South; Line and station closed	Caledonian Railway; Paisley and Barrhead District Railway	Terminus
