= Dams to Darnley Country Park =

Country park near Glasgow, Scotland

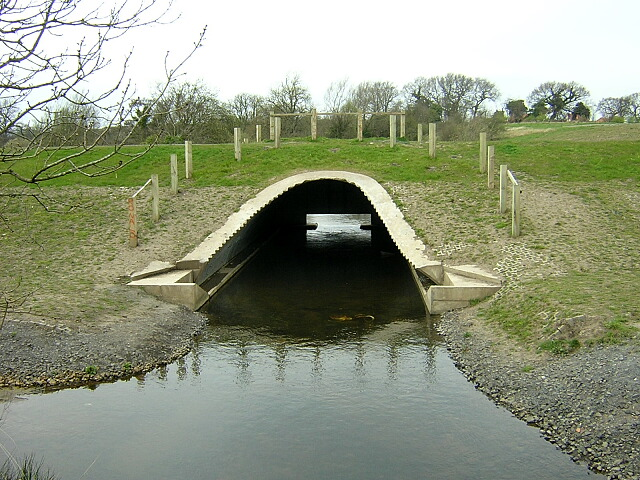
- Brock Burn
- Interactive map of Dams to Darnley Country Park
- Type: Public Park
- Location: Between Newton Mearns and Barrhead, East Renfrewshire and Darnley, Southpark Village and Parkhouse, Glasgow
- Coordinates: 55°47′27″N 4°21′31″W
- Operator: East Renfrewshire Council, Glasgow City Council
- Status: Open all year
- Website: www.damstodarnley.org

Dams to Darnley Country Park is a 1,350-acre (550-hectare) country park crossing parts of the East Renfrewshire and Glasgow areas in Scotland. The park comprises the historic greenspace between the towns of Barrhead and Newton Mearns in East Renfrewshire, and the areas of Darnley, Parkhouse and Southpark Village in south Glasgow. Being designated in 2004, it is one of the newest country parks in Scotland.

== Geography ==
The area occupied by Dams to Darnley Country Park has been used for leisure for many years. The park is largely farmland, but contains some historic woodlands. The park is also noted for its large reservoirs. By far the largest of these is Balgray Reservoir, which has Aurs Road, the main road through the park, alongside it for some distance. The rural portion of Aurs Road is entirely included within the park, and the road is the main road connecting the two halves of East Renfrewshire (although a new road is planned for this purpose). There are three other reservoirs in the park: Ryat Linn Reservoir, the Category A Listed Waulkmill Glen Reservoir, and the small Littleton Reservoir. The Brock Burn flows around the reservoirs, very directly adjacent to several, although Littleton Reservoir is the only one that the burn actually flows through, with the burn going on to flow into the White Cart Water near the Silverburn Shopping Centre in Pollok.

At the west, the park ends at the Glasgow Central to Neilston railway line (the railway enters the park for around 2 km east of this point and crosses a large viaduct over the Waulkmill Glen Reservoir before being used as part of the park boundary in Newton Mearns). In this area, the new Balgray railway station off Balgraystone Road, created to serve new housing developments nearby, was opened in September 2026. This railway station also serves the park.

== History ==
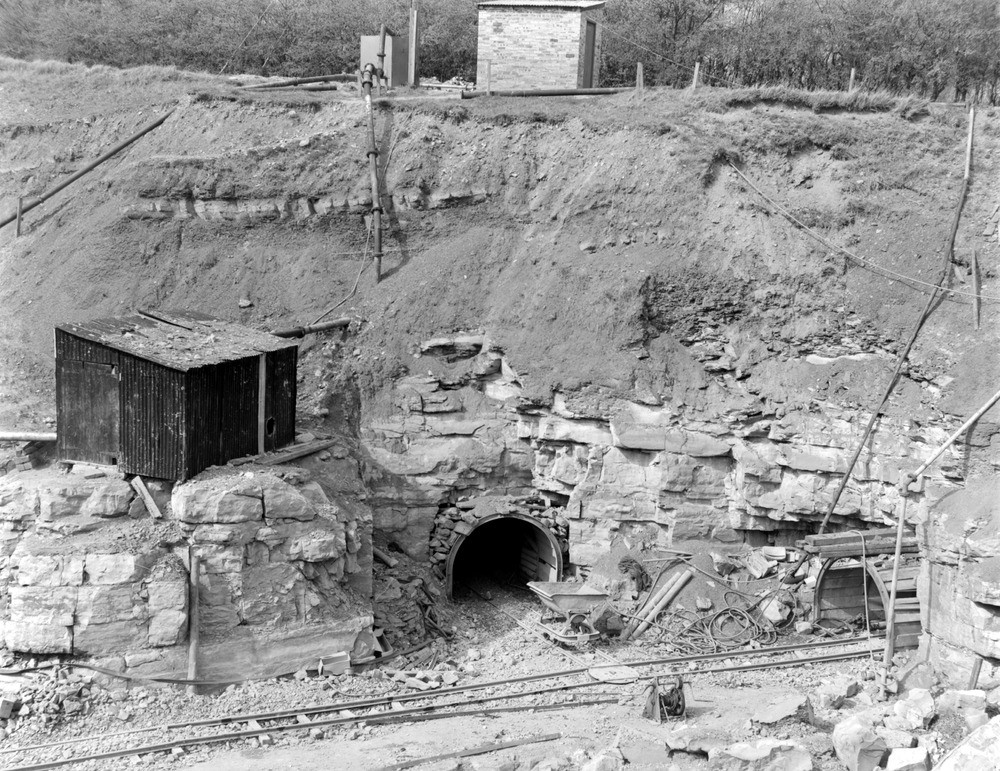
Darnley Quarry, 1959

Mining was conducted in the Darnley area since 1610, as evidenced by a lease agreement between Sir John Maxwell, John Hall and George Stephenson, which is archived together with the Pollock-Estate Papers. In it, Stevenson acquired the rights to mine limestone at Over Darnley. As early as 1615 coal was mined, as evidenced by a contract between Sir John Maxwell and Robert Milne in April 1615. The Darnley Lime Works Tramway and Mineral Railway consisted of a narrow gauge field railway and probably a standard gauge works railway, which were successively operated at least from 1898 until the late 1950s or early 1960s. Then the old quarries were used as landfills.

== Features ==
The park currently lacks many features, however the long-term plan includes adding more leisure facilities and better access to the local communities. As of 2020, the park mainly consists of a long path from Balgraystone Road, around the large Balgray Reservoir, across Aurs Road, down a steep hill past the other reservoirs and under a large viaduct. The path then passes an old mill before going through a woodland disconnecting Darnley from the Parkhouse area before ending on the Nitshill Road.

Between 2024 and 2026, a project was undertaken to realign the Aurs Road, including construction of a new bridge over Brock Burn to remove weight limits on the previous bridge. The realigned road opened to traffic on 29 May 2026 after extended delays. Other future plans have included a visitor centre/leisure centre on the northern peninsula into the Balgray Reservoir, as well as new cycle and walking routes around the park.
