= Southpark Village =

Coordinates: 55.801307°N 4.344872°W

Southpark Village: Scots: Soothpairk
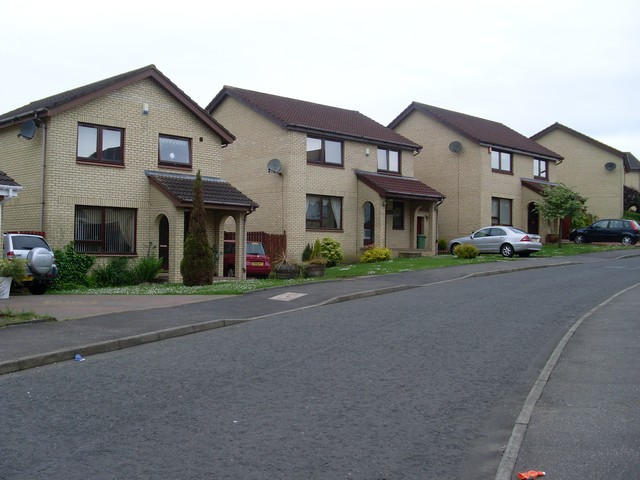
- Houses on Waulkglen Avenue

- Location within Glasgow
- Council area: Glasgow City Council
- Lieutenancy area: Glasgow
- Country: Scotland
- Sovereign state: United Kingdom
- Post town: GLASGOW
- Postcode district: G53 7
- Dialling code: 0141
- Police: Scotland
- Fire: Scottish
- Ambulance: Scottish
- UK Parliament: Glasgow South West
- Scottish Parliament: Glasgow Pollok

Southpark Village is a housing estate in the Darnley area of the Scottish city of Glasgow. The northwestern area was built during the mid to late 1980s, but the southeastern part was built in the late 2010s. It is located on the south-western edge of the city, close to the towns of Barrhead and Newton Mearns in East Renfrewshire. Nearby areas within Glasgow itself are the rest of Darnley to the north, Deaconsbank to the east, and Parkhouse to the northwest, although Southpark is physically separated from all but the rest of Darnley by the Dams to Darnley Country Park and M77 motorway.

== History ==
The entire area was once owned by Lord Darnley, who ran linen works in the area. The remains of a large house can be found a few miles south of the village, and this appears to have belonged to Lord Darnley himself.

In later years the surrounding area was extensively quarried for limestone and mined for coal; During the late stages of the life of the mine, a catastrophic explosion occurred killing many local miners. A monument to those lost in the disaster currently sits on the Nitshill Road (A726) beside the train station at Nitshill, north west of Southpark. The consequences of this disaster and the subsequent abandonment of the mine have been felt as recently as the late 1990s when a mine shaft collapsed in an area near the estate, leading to a massive landfill operation which successfully prevented the land around the shaft from collapsing any further.

== Characteristics ==
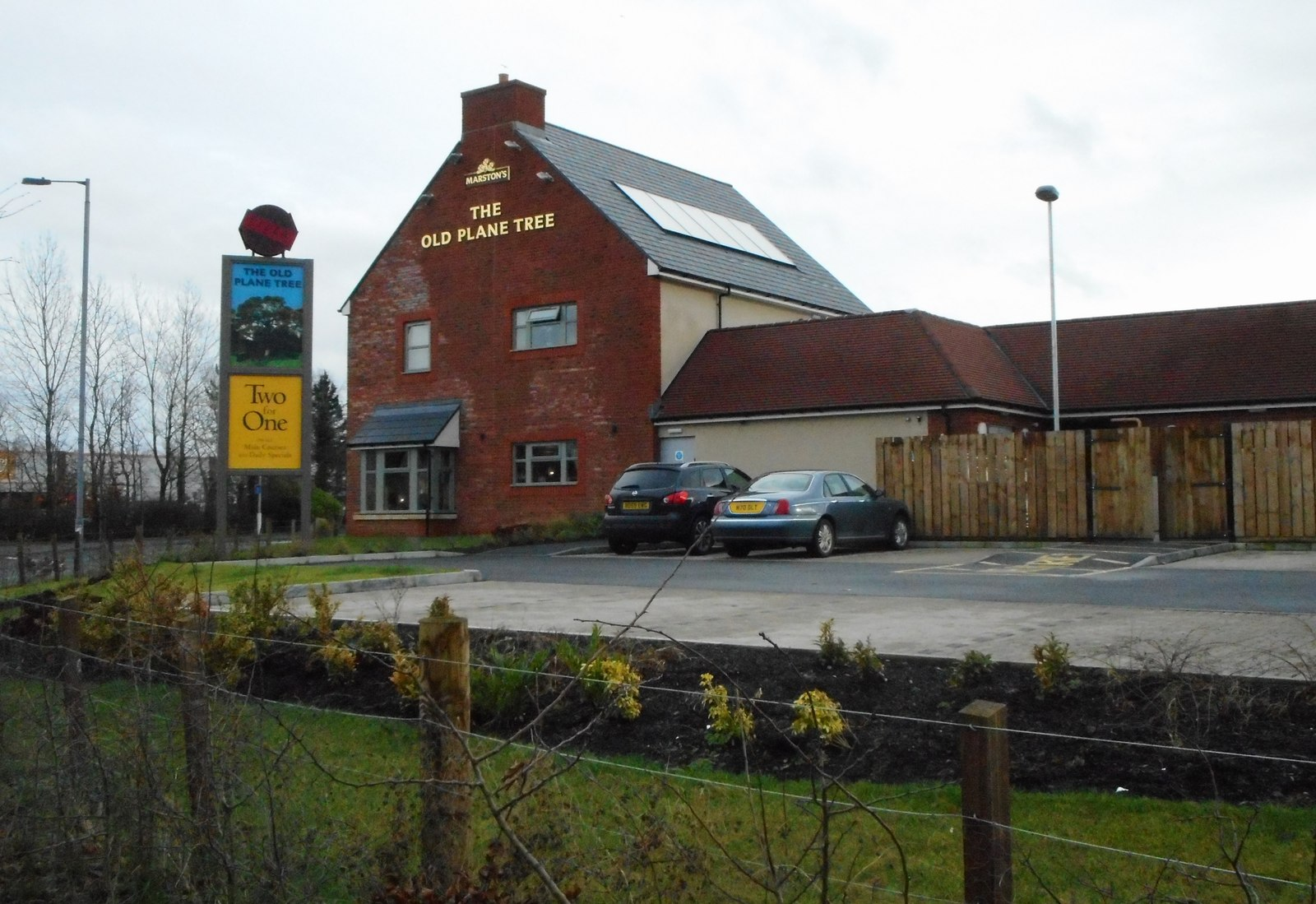
'The Old Plane Tree' pub near the main road

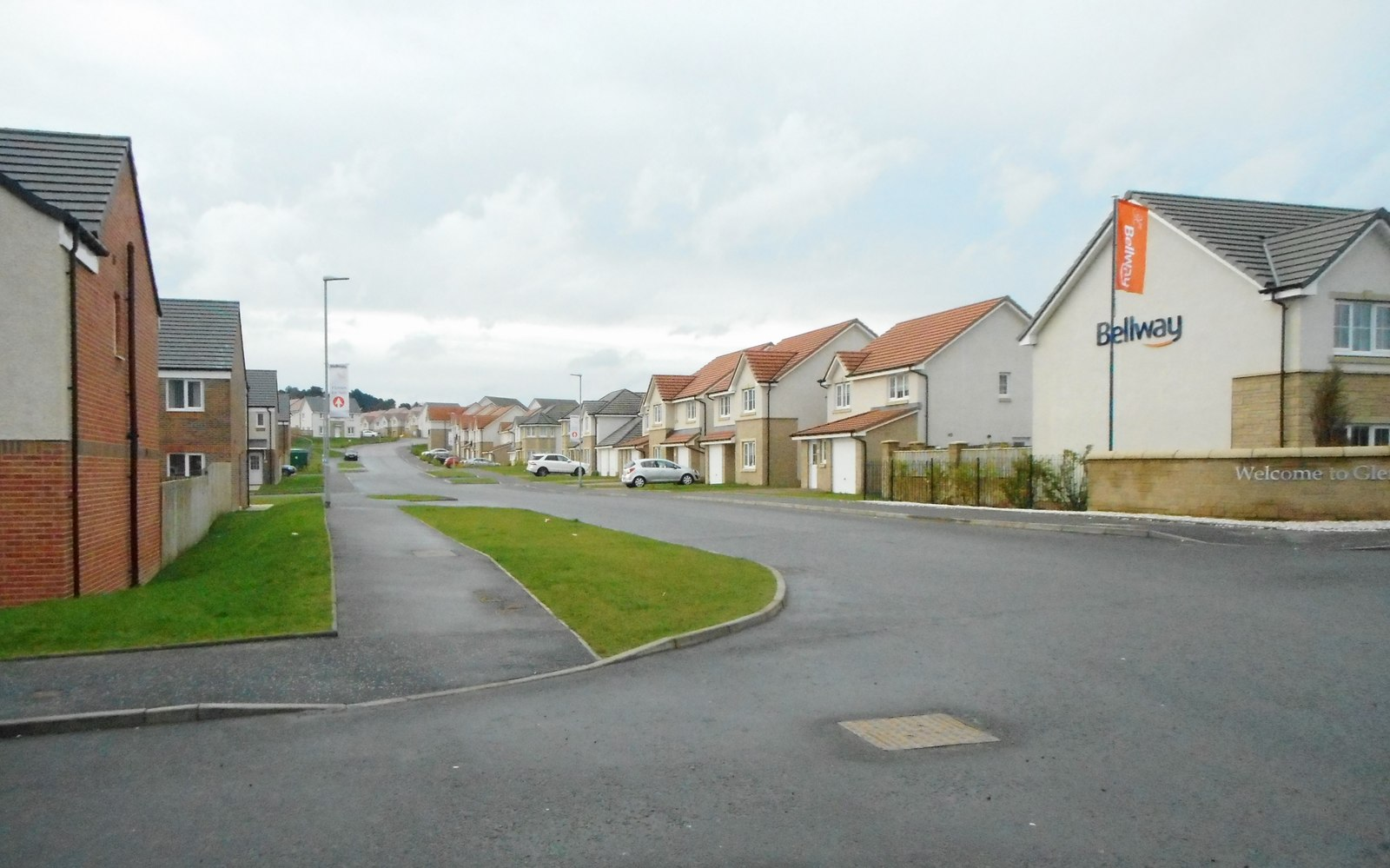
New housing at Glenmill (2017)

Most homes in the area are occupied by private owners who are within working class or lower/medium-middle class income brackets. The neighbourhood is conveniently located for commuting to work by car via the M77 motorway and is also fairly close to suburban railway stations (Nitshill and Priesthill & Darnley).

Like much of Glasgow since the mid-20th century, the area is ethnically diverse. Southpark falls under the council tax bracket of Glasgow City Council, within its Greater Pollok ward. The area has many communal landscaped areas that are maintained through financial contributions by the residents of the estate.

There is a retail park to the north of the housing, consisting of large Sainsbury's, fast food outlets and a pub/restaurant. It was built on the site of the Darnley Mains farm. To the southeast of this retail area there is a large B&Q store.

Land to the east of B&Q - directly adjacent to the motorway - was designated for further retail for some years, but failed to attract investors for this use (likely due in part to the busy Silverburn Centre at the next junction north) so was reallocated for new housing in the late 2010s. At that time another residential development between the existing Southpark neighbourhood and the Darnley Mains site, Glenmill (320 houses) was also constructed by Persimmon Homes and Bellway.
