= 4 ft 6 in gauge railway =

Scottish railway track width

The 4 ft 6 in (1,372 mm) track gauge, also called the Scotch gauge, was adopted by early 19th century railways mainly in the Lanarkshire area of Scotland. It differed from the gauge of 4 ft 8 in (1,422 mm) that was used on some early lines in England. Early railways chose their own gauge, but later in the century interchange of equipment was facilitated by establishing a uniform rail gauge across railways: the 'standard gauge' of 4 ft 8 1/2 in (1,435 mm). In the early 1840s standard gauge lines began to be constructed in Scotland, and all the Scotch gauge lines were eventually converted to standard gauge. The building of new Scotch gauge railways was outlawed in Great Britain in 1846 by the Regulating the Gauge of Railways Act 1846. From 1903, tram lines of Tokyo adopted this gauge.

== Scottish railways built to Scotch gauge ==
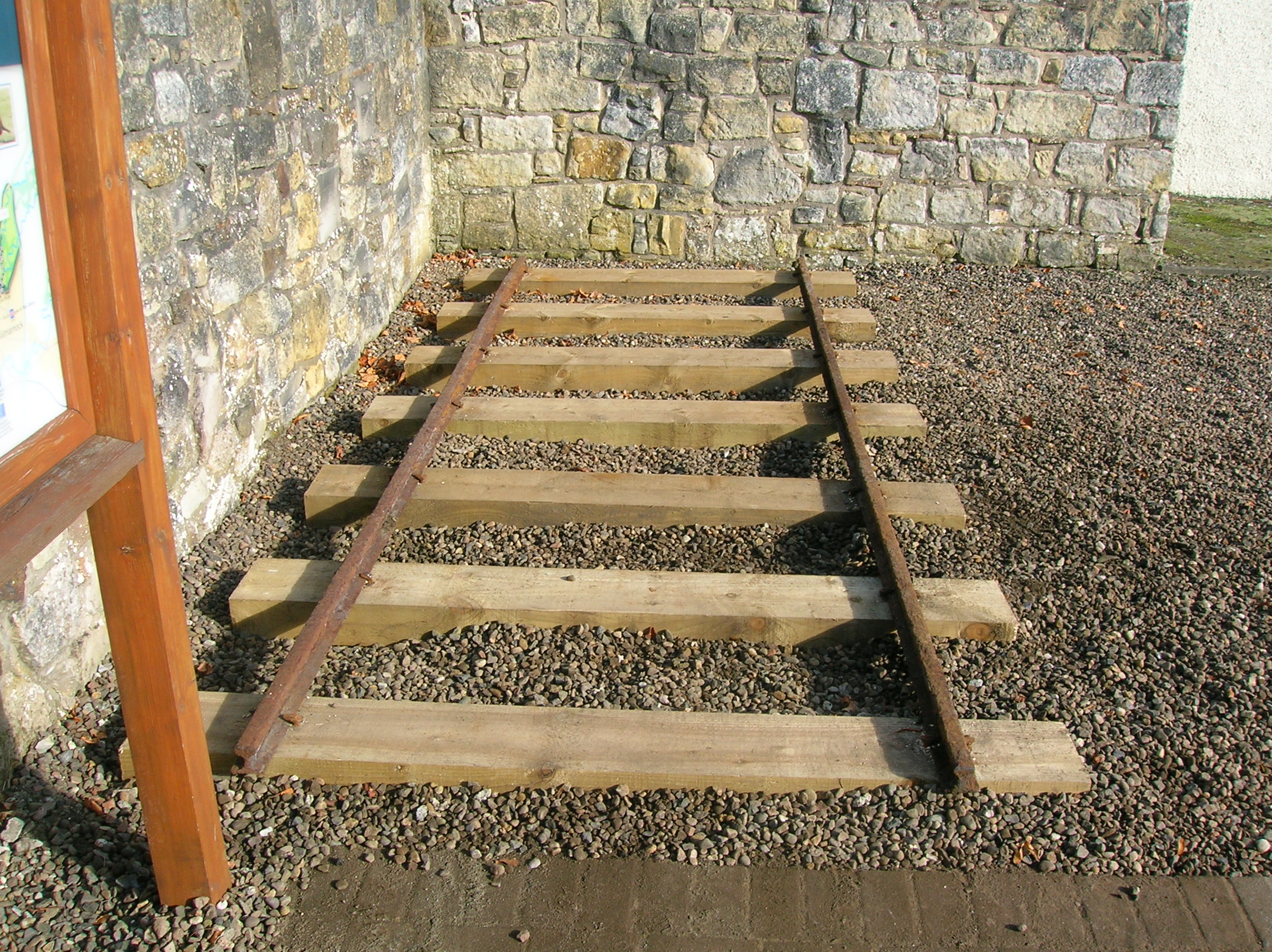
A section of original 1831 Scotch gauge track relaid at Eglinton Country Park in North Ayrshire.

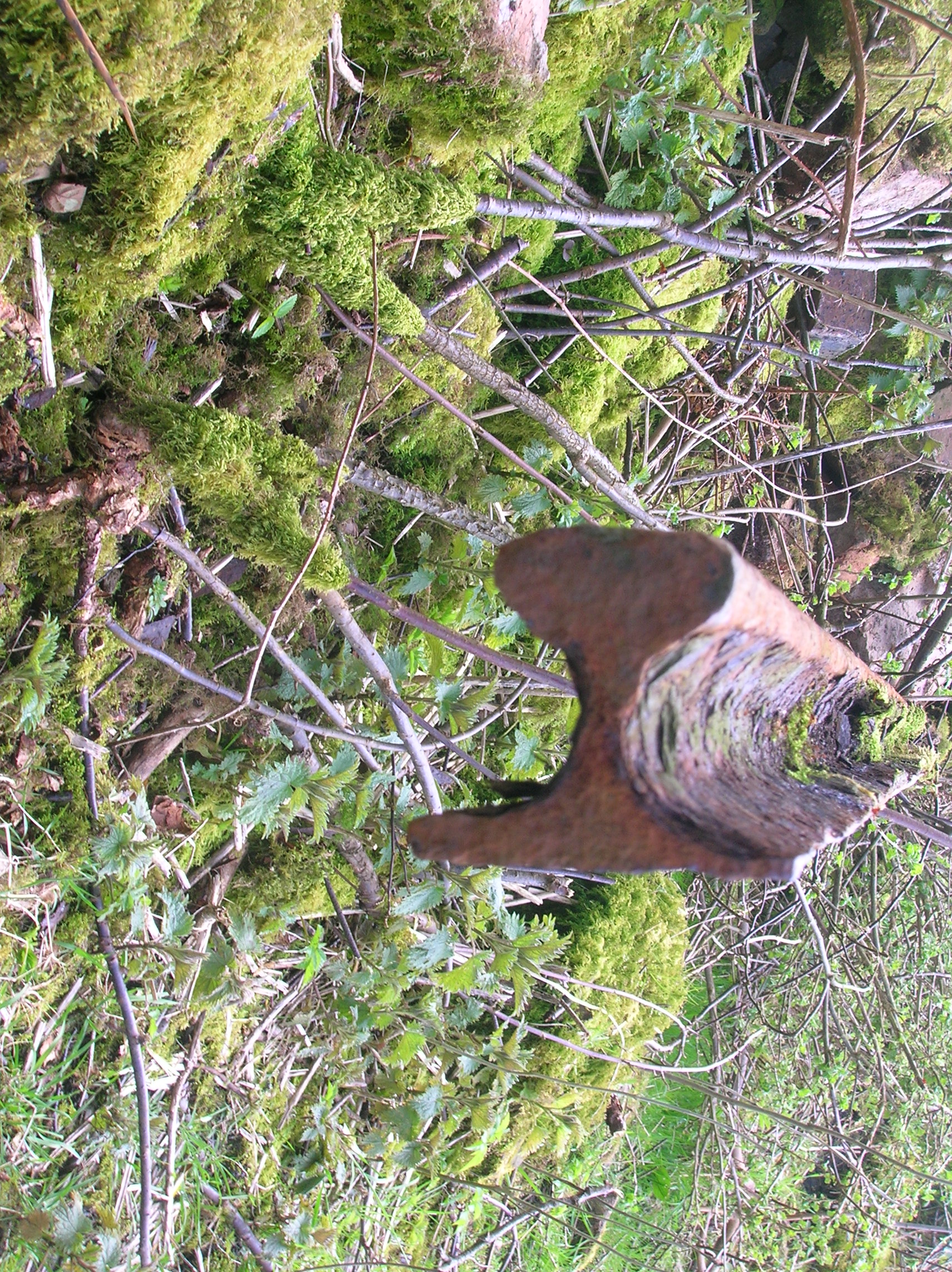
A 15-foot (4.57 m) length of flat-bottomed Vignoles rail from the Scotch gauge Ardrossan and Johnstone Railway

A small number of early to mid-19th century passenger railways were built to 4 ft 6 in (1,372 mm) Scotch gauge including:

Name	Length	
Ardrossan and Johnstone Railway.	10 miles (16 km).	Authorised on 20 July 1806 and opened on 6 November 1810. In 1840 the line was regauged to standard gauge.
Monkland and Kirkintilloch Railway.	10 miles (16 km).	Authorised on 17 May 1824 and opened on 1 October 1826. The engineer was Thomas Grainger. The M&KR altered its track gauge to standard on 26 and 27 July 1847.
Ballochney Railway.	6 1/2 miles (10.5 km).	Incorporated on 19 May 1826 and opened on 8 August 1828. The company changed its gauge to 1435 mm on 26 July and 27 July 1847.
Edinburgh and Dalkeith Railway.		Authorised on 26 May 1826 and opened in part on 4 July 1831. In 1846 converted to standard gauge and steam traction.
Garnkirk and Glasgow Railway.	8 1/4 miles (13.3 km).	Incorporated on 26 May 1826 and ceremonially opened on 27 September 1831 for both passengers and goods. The engineers were Thomas Grainger and John Miller from Edinburgh. Converted to standard gauge before 1847.
Wishaw and Coltness Railway.	11 miles (17.7 km).	Incorporated on 21 June 1829 and partially opened on 21 March 1834. The engineers were Thomas Grainger and John Miller from Edinburgh. In 1849, it became part of the standard gauge Caledonian Railway.
Slamannan Railway.	12 1/2 miles (20.1 km).	Incorporated on 3 July 1835 and opened on 31 August 1840. Converted to standard gauge in 1847.
Paisley and Renfrew Railway.	3 miles (4.8 km).	Authorised on 21 July 1835 and opened on 3 April 1837 for both passengers and goods. The engineer was Thomas Grainger. Converted to Standard Gauge 1866.

Robert Stephenson and Company built a Scotch gauge locomotive, the St. Rollox, for the Garnkirk and Glasgow Railway; which was later sold to the Paisley and Renfrew Railway.

All the lines were later relaid in standard gauge.

== Other early 19th century Scottish gauges ==
=== 4 ft 6½ in gauge ===
In addition to the above lines, there were three railways, authorised between 1822 and 1835, that were built in the Dundee area, to a gauge of 4 ft 6 1/2 in (1,384 mm). They were:

- The Dundee and Newtyle Railway. Length: 10 1/2 miles (16.9 km).
- The Newtyle and Coupar Angus Railway. Length: 6 1/2 miles (10.5 km).
- The Newtyle and Glammis Railway. Length: 10 miles (16 km).

=== 5 ft 6 in gauge ===
Grainger and Miller built another two railway lines in the same area to a gauge of 5 ft 6 in (1,676 mm). Thomas Grainger is said to have chosen this gauge, since he regarded 4 ft 8 1/2 in (1,435 mm) standard gauge as being too narrow and Isambard Kingdom Brunel's 7 ft 1/4 in (2,140 mm) Brunel gauge as being too wide. They were:

- The Dundee and Arbroath Railway. Length: 14 1/2 miles (23 km). Incorporated on 19 May 1836 and opened in part in October 1838.
- The Arbroath and Forfar Railway. Length: 15 miles (24 km). Incorporated on 19 May 1836 and opened in part on 24 November 1838.

== End of Scotch gauge ==
The Glasgow, Paisley, Kilmarnock and Ayr Railway and the Glasgow, Paisley and Greenock Railway, which both obtained Parliamentary Approval on 15 July 1837 and were later to become part of the Glasgow and South Western Railway and the Caledonian Railway, respectively, were built to standard gauge from the start.

The Lee Moor Tramway operated a Scotch Gauge line from 1899 to the early 1960s, with the two 0-4-0ST locomotives built by Peckett and Sons to their M4 Design. LEE MOOR No.1 (works number 783) is preserved at the Wheal Martyn Museum near St. Austell and LEE MOOR No.2 (works number 784) is preserved at the South Devon Railway, neither are operational. Both locomotives were originally preserved by the Lee Moor Tramway Preservation Group.

The standard gauge of 4 ft 8 1/2 in (1,435 mm), also known as the Stephenson gauge after George Stephenson, was adopted in Great Britain after 1846 after the passing of the Regulating the Gauge of Railways Act 1846. A few remnants of old lines remain, but are non functional with the exception of one example of the St Michael's Mount Tramway at St Michael's Mount in Cornwall. It is a partial underground railway that used to bring luggage up to the castle. It occasionally operates, but only for demonstration reasons and is not open to the general public, although a small stretch is visible at the harbour. It is therefore believed to be Britain's last functionally operational Scotch gauge railway.

== Use in Japan ==
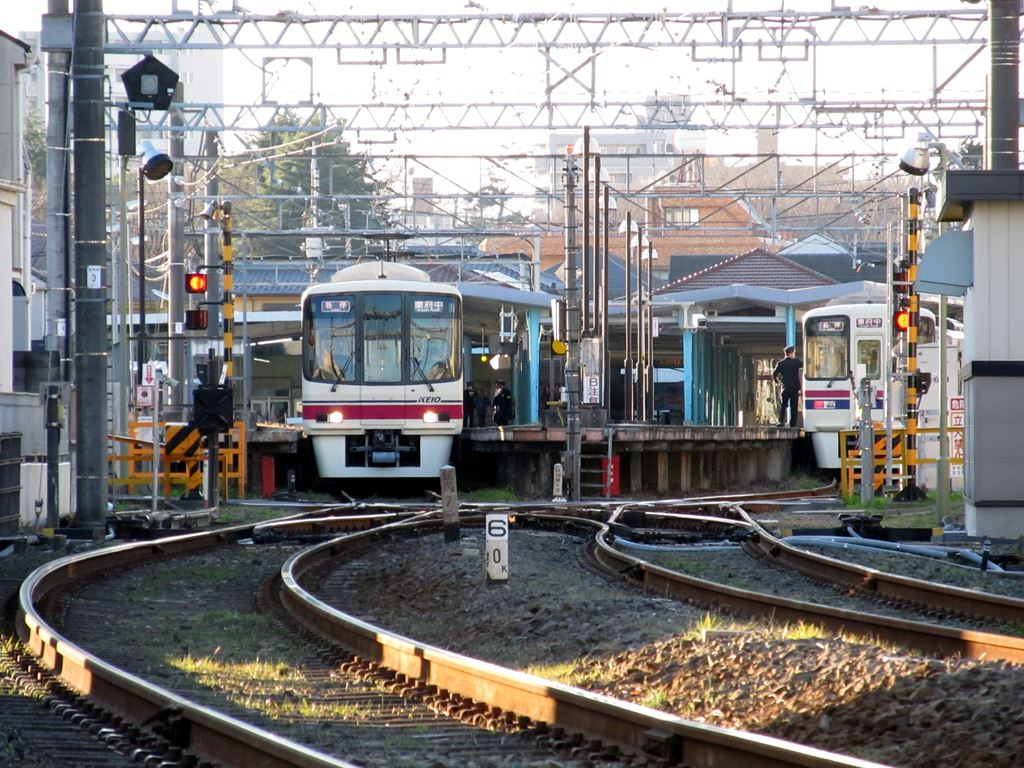
Keiō Line 1,372 mm (4 ft 6 in) gauge tracks

Map of railway lines with 1,372 mm gauge in Tokyo area

After the end of the Scotch gauge in Britain, the gauge was revived in Japan. Its origins date back to the Tokyo Horsecar Railway, one of former horsecar operators in Tokyo, adopted 4 ft 6 in (1,372 mm) gauge in 1887. Since 1903, most of the tram network in Tokyo was built with 4 ft 6 in (1,372 mm) rail gauge, called "coach gauge" (馬車軌間, Basha Kikan). The use of this gauge extended to other suburban lines that through-operated onto the city tram network. Although Tokyo has abolished its major tram network (except the Arakawa Line), as of 2026 the following lines still use this gauge:

- The Keiō Line and its branches (excluding the Inokashira Line). 1372mm gauge was chosen in 1915 to provide through service with the now-abolished Tokyo city tram. Length: 72.0 km (44.7 mi). Commuter railways connecting Tokyo and its suburb operated by Keio Corporation.
- The Toei Shinjuku Line. Length: 23.5 km (14.6 mi). One of rapid transit lines in Tokyo, built to provide through service with the Keiō Line. Originally the Ministry of Transport intended the Keiō Line to convert to Standard gauge (so that the Shinjuku Line would have the same gauge as the Asakusa Line for maintenance convenience). But the service area as of late 20th century was too densely populated to risk a massive disruption of the Keiō service, and the Shinjuku Line was constructed in 1372 mm instead.
- The Toden Arakawa Line. Length: 12.2 km (7.6 mi). Only surviving line of Tokyo municipal tram.
- The Tōkyū Setagaya Line. Length: 5.0 km (3.1 mi). Another tram line in Tokyo operated by Tokyu Corporation.
- The Hakodate City Tram. Length: 10.9 km (6.8 mi). Only user of the gauge outside the Greater Tokyo Area.

== See also ==
- Narrow-gauge railway
- Standard-gauge railway
- List of tram systems by gauge and electrification
