= Paisley and Renfrew Railway =

Former railway line in Scotland

The Paisley and Renfrew Railway was an early Scottish railway company that constructed and operated a line between Paisley and the River Clyde at Renfrew Wharf, enabling journeys between Glasgow and Paisley by connecting river boat. The railway was built to the track gauge of 4 ft 6 in (1,372 mm) on stone block sleepers.

The line opened in 1837 and used locomotive power at first. Its operating costs were much higher than expected, and its income was disappointing, and horse traction was used to save expenditure.

The company sold its line to the Glasgow, Paisley, Kilmarnock and Ayr Railway in 1847, but horse traction continued until 1866 when a connecting curve to the main line was opened, and through trains between Renfrew and Glasgow operated.

Never a flourishing line, it closed to passengers in 1967, and to goods traffic in 1981.

== History ==
Paisley and Renfrew Railway Act 1835
- Act of Parliament
- Parliament of the United Kingdom
- Long title: An Act for making and maintaining a Railway between the Town of Paisley and the South Side of the River Clyde at Renfrew Ferry, and for constructing Wharfs, Quays, or Landing Places there; all in the Counter of Rethrew.
- Citation: 5 & 6 Will. 4. c. lxxxv

Dates
- Royal assent: 21 July 1835

Other legislation
- Repealed by: Glasgow and South Western Railway Consolidation Act 1855

Status: Repealed

Text of statute as originally enacted

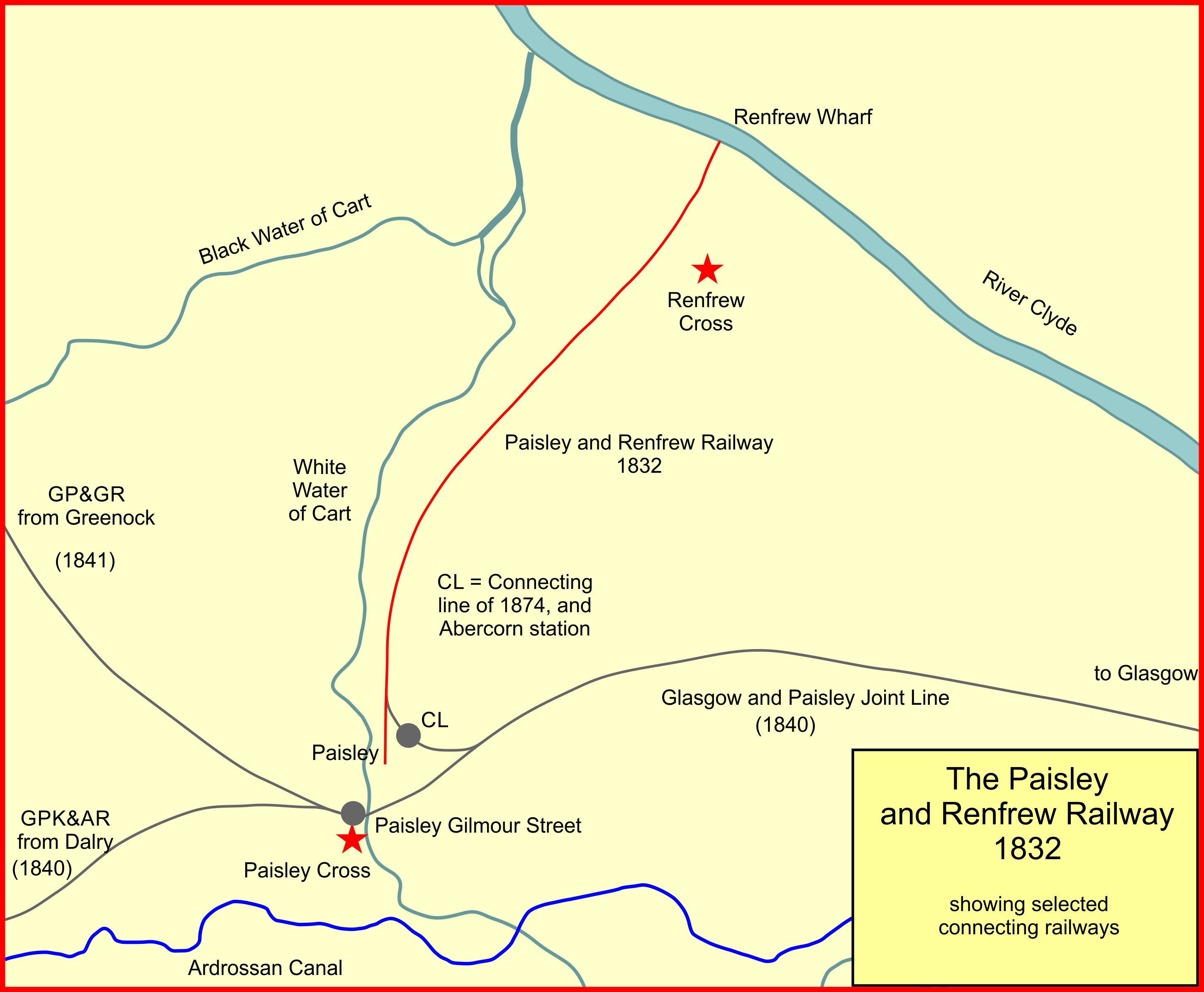
System map of the Paisley and Renfrew Railway

Paisley was an important Burgh at the beginning of the nineteenth century, and most passenger and goods journeys involved a passage along the River Clyde followed by the tedious and slow negotiation of the River Cart. This was such an obstruction that local promoters decided to construct a railway between Renfrew Wharf and the centre of Paisley. They employed the engineers Thomas Grainger and John Miller, who had successfully designed several coal lines in the West of Scotland and elsewhere. The line was authorised by the Paisley and Renfrew Railway Act 1835 (5 & 6 Will. 4. c. lxxxv) on 21 July 1835.

Robertson observes that "it was not a line with any prospects of success. The Glasgow, Paisley and Johnstone Canal made the line unlikely to be of much interest as part of a route between Paisley and Glasgow, and before it even opened an act had been passed for the Glasgow Paisley and Greenock, which was to appropriate traffic in the opposite direction."

== First years of the line ==
The line opened on 3 April 1837, with locomotive working from the start; this was considered important to ensure a speed advantage over waterborne transport. Authorised capital was £23,000 with borrowing powers of £10,000. The railway cost about £30,000 to build.

The company bought three locomotives: Paisley and Renfrew, made by Messrs Murdock, Aikin and Co., Glasgow; and St. Rollox, originally made by Robert Stephenson and Company for the Garnkirk and Glasgow Railway and later sold to the Paisley and Renfrew Railway.

The line was 3 miles (4.8 km) long on an almost level gradient throughout; when first constructed had only one bridge, carrying Inchinnan Road. Whishaw, writing in 1842, described the track: "Light rails are used throughout, which are fixed in chairs at intervals of 3 feet [910 mm]; the chairs are bedded on stone blocks in the usual way." As well as the three locomotives, there were seven passenger carriages and eight trucks. "The trains during the summer months run in each direction every half-hour during the chief part of the day. The time occupied in performing the distance of three miles [4.8 km] is usually about 12 minutes ... The number of double trips daily during the summer months is ten." The track gauge was 4 ft 6 in (1,372 mm), (Note: According to Whishaw, Robertson and Cobb; Ross says 4 ft 4 in, equating to 1,321 mm, on page 16 and again on page 33 but this appears to be a mistake.) commonly used in central Scotland, the 4 ft 6 in gauge railway.

Whishaw stated that for the year ended 15 May 1839, receipts were £3,091 and expenditure £2,613, so that operating cost 86% of gross income. Many early railways in the west of Scotland had projected an operating ratio of 10%.

The Glasgow, Paisley, Kilmarnock and Ayr Railway (GPK&AR) opened its line between Bridge Street station in Glasgow and Paisley Gilmour Street station on 14 July 1840. The line between Glasgow and Paisley was jointly owned and operated with the Glasgow, Paisley and Greenock Railway (GP&GR), which started operations in 1841. This line removed much of the trade from the Paisley and Renfrew Railway.

In 1842 the company changed to horse traction as an economy measure, much business having been lost by then to the GP&GR. The company had never made a profit and the line was leased out, presumably to a private contractor. In 1846 the lease charge was £700 a year.

== The line sold ==
Paisley and Renfrew Railway (Sale and Improvement) Act 1847
- Act of Parliament
- Parliament of the United Kingdom
- Long title: An Act to authorize the Sale of the Paisley and Renfrew Railway to the Glasgow, Paisley, Kilmarnock, and Ayr Railway Company, and the Improvement of the said Railway by that Company.
- Citation: 10 & 11 Vict. c. ccxxix

Dates
- Royal assent: 22 July 1847

Text of statute as originally enacted

In 1846 promoters were planning to submit a parliamentary bill for a Paisley, Barrhead and Hurlet Railway (Note: Hurlet was a village east of Barrhead, where the present day A736 and A726 roads cross.) and the provisional directors undertook to purchase the Paisley and Renfrew line. The offer was in effect guaranteed by the GPK&AR, and when the Paisley, Barrhead and Hurlet line failed to get authorisation, the GPK&AR intervened directly. Its purchase of the Paisley and Renfrew line was ratified by the Paisley and Renfrew Railway (Sale and Improvement) Act 1847 (10 & 11 Vict. c. ccxxix) on 22 July 1847. (Note: Awdry gives the effective date of the sale as 31 July 1852, but this must refer to another transaction.) The 1847 act authorised the conversion of its track to standard gauge. The purchase price was £34,000.

The line was not physically connected to the GPK&AR and was of a different track gauge; having acquired it the GPK&AR advertised it for lease in November 1847.

In 1850 the Glasgow, Paisley Kilmarnock and Ayr Railway absorbed the Glasgow, Dumfries and Carlisle Railway and was renamed the Glasgow and South Western Railway (G&SWR).

By 1852 the G&SWR had reallocated the lease of the line for a higher charge: £1,000 per annum.

== An upgrade ==
In 1861 the Burgh magistrates of Renfrew were agitating for an improved railway connection. By now the horse-drawn line on stone block sleepers, not directly connected to or even adjacent to the main line at Paisley, was a serious anachronism, and they pressed the G&SWR to improve matters.

Slowly the G&SWR took action, and on 1 January 1866 the line was closed to passengers to enable the regauging and track relaying work. Double track was installed, and a connecting line was laid at Paisley, curving towards Glasgow and joining the Joint Line at Greenlaw. The Hamilton Street (Paisley) terminus was closed to passengers and a new Paisley station named Abercorn was opened on the connecting curve, on Renfrew Road. Locomotive traction was resumed, and a 2-2-2WT locomotive no 159 was ordered from Neilson and Company to work the line. This was the first tank locomotive to be ordered by the G&SWR.

The Renfrew terminus was closed between February 1866 and September 1867, and a new passenger station was opened at Renfrew, Fulbar Street opened on 1 May 1866. (Note: The Railway Magazine says the closure was only between February and May 1866.) There were eleven through trains to Glasgow daily, with a best time of 25 minutes. Passengers travelling only between Glasgow and Paisley were not accepted on these trains, to preserve the business of the Joint Line.

== The twentieth century ==
A new railway was opened in 1903, the Glasgow and Renfrew District Railway, an extension of the Princes Dock Railway, leaving the Joint Line at Shieldhall. It reached a new Renfrew station at Porterfield, close alongside the Paisley and Renfrew line but not at first connected to it. The adjacent routes were in fact connected in 1916.

The line from Abercorn to Renfrew South was singled in 1936. The wharf was bombed during the war and then demolished.

== The route ==
The line ran from north to south, from a wharf on the River Clyde at Renfrew to a terminal on Hamilton Street in Paisley. When the line was built, this was the only railway station in Paisley, and it was simply known as "Paisley", and there seems to be no evidence that it was called Paisley Hamilton Street. Butt state that there were two stations at Renfrew from the beginning of the line, Renfrew Wharf and Renfrew Fulbar Street. Intermediate stops are likely to have been arranged during the horse-drawn period, without the formality of a "station" being provided.

When the line was improved for locomotive working by the G&SWR, additional stations were opened, and in 1962 a further station was opened to serve industrial areas north of Paisley. The station list was therefore:

- Renfrew Wharf
- Renfrew Fulbar Street
- South Renfrew; opened 1 May 1897
- Sandyford Platform; opened June 1914; renamed Sandyford by June 1952 BR;
- Paisley Abercorn.

The original Hamilton Street terminus remained in use for goods traffic until 1970. The main line closed to passengers on 5 June 1967, closing fully north of South Renfrew in 1978, and the remainder in 1981. There was a wharf on the Cart Water immediately north of Paisley, in operation from 1891 to 1965.

Private siding extensions were built at Renfrew Wharf to serve the two shipbuilders: William Simons & Company Ltd and Lobnitz & Company Ltd, located on the River Clyde. They later merged to become Simons-Lobnitz Ltd; and the ship yards closed in the early 1960s.

== The line today ==
Much of the route of the line is now occupied by a cycle path, and partly by a private road used by the Doosan Babcock site in Renfrew. A home improvement superstore was built on the site of the former Paisley Abercorn railway station goods yard in the late 1970s.
