= Paisley and Barrhead District Railway =

Former railway line in Scotland

The Paisley and Barrhead District Railway was a railway in Scotland that ran between the towns of Paisley and Barrhead. It was intended to serve industrial premises and develop local passenger and goods business.

The Caledonian Railway managed the construction, but when the line was nearly complete, tramway competition had become obviously dominant for local passenger journeys, and the Caledonian decided not to start the intended passenger service. The line opened for goods trains only in 1905 and 1906, and served industrial sites on the route. Most of the line had become moribund by the 1950s, but when the Linwood motor car factory opened in 1961, a rail connection to it was provided from the line, becoming the only part of the network still in use. That link was closed in 1984.

== History ==
=== First railways ===
Paisley had long been an important manufacturing town, especially in the textile industries. When main line railways in the west of Scotland were being planned in the 1830s, it was natural that the town would be considered an important intermediate point, and in 1840 the Glasgow, Paisley, Kilmarnock and Ayr Railway opened; the following year the Glasgow, Paisley and Greenock Railway opened its line too. The two companies shared, and jointly operated, a route between Glasgow and Paisley, the Glasgow and Paisley Joint Railway.

Those two railway companies were later merged with others, and became part of the Glasgow and South Western Railway (G&SWR) and the Caledonian Railway respectively. The two larger companies were keen rivals and over time expanded their area of influence in Scotland.

The Barrhead and Neilston areas were already the home to much industrial activity, especially in the valley of the Levern Water, and in 1848 the Glasgow, Barrhead and Neilston Direct Railway opened. In 1873 that line was extended to Kilmarnock and transferred to joint control of the Caledonian and the G&SWR companies; the extended line was called the Glasgow, Barrhead and Kilmarnock Joint Railway (GB&KJR).

In the later decades of the nineteenth century, there was considerable further industrial development in areas not directly served by the earlier lines. This was particularly the case in Paisley, where much industry was established south of the town, and in 1885 the G&SWR opened the Paisley Canal Line which ran from Glasgow to Elderslie on a more southerly alignment than the Joint Line. The following year it extended that line by a branch to Potterhill, and in doing so served a considerable area of industrial activity.

=== Linking Paisley and Barrhead ===
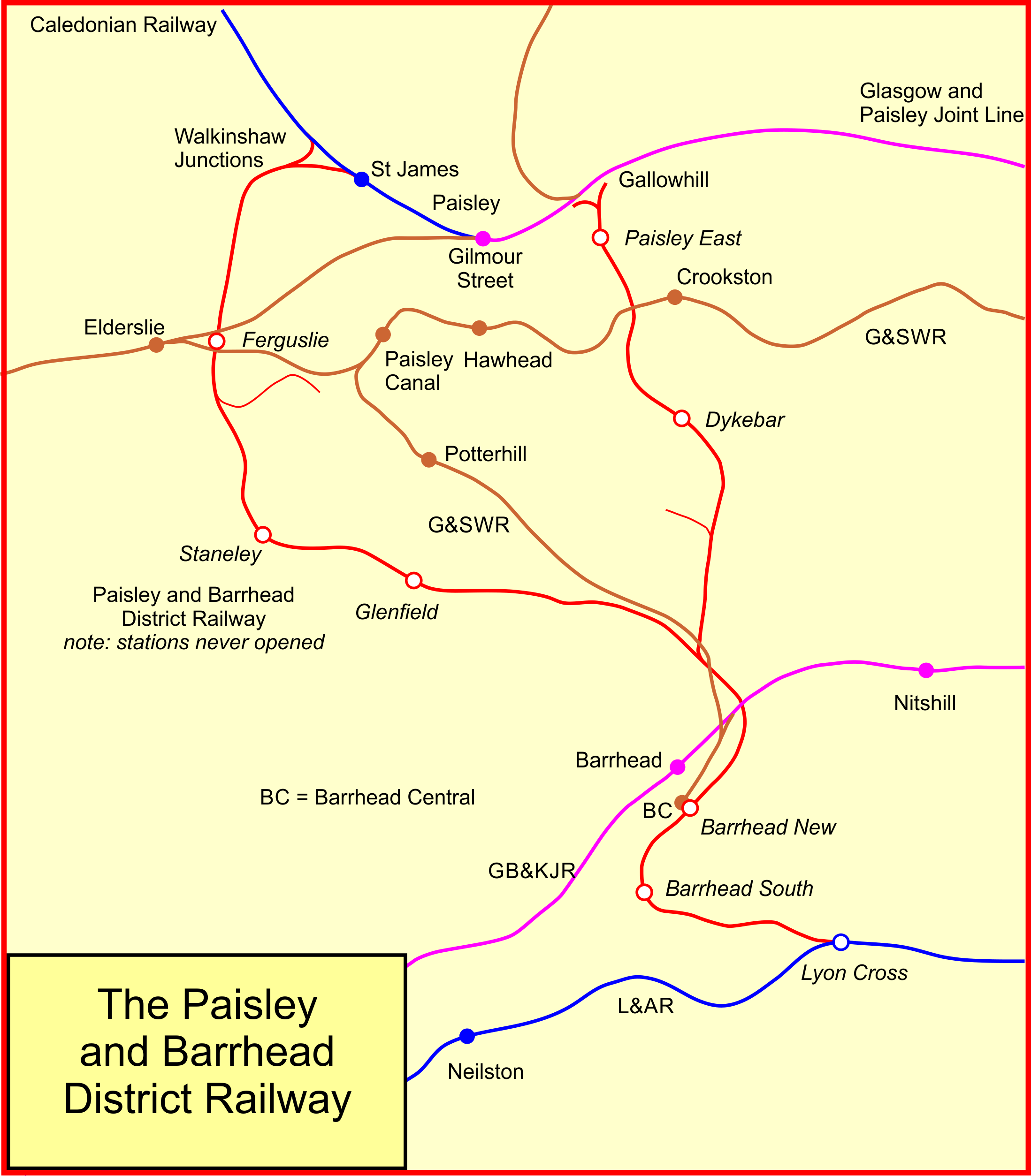
The Paisley and Barrhead District Railway system

The centres of Paisley and Barrhead are about five miles (8 km) apart, and the spread of Paisley industry towards Barrhead, and the location of much of Barrhead industry on the Paisley side encouraged the idea of linking them. As well as the goods traffic that might be captured, suburban passenger business could be assumed to be attracted. Residential traffic had been increasing in other localities; moreover a circular service from Glasgow through both towns had operational benefits.

In 1898 the G&SWR obtained the Glasgow and South Western Railway Act 1898 (61 & 62 Vict. c. clix) which authorised a line from its Potterhill terminus to Barrhead, there joining the GB&KJR. The line opened in 1902 and a circular passenger service was operated from Glasgow.

=== Paisley and Barrhead District Railway: authorisation and construction ===
Paisley and Barrhead District Railway Act 1897
- Act of Parliament
- Parliament of the United Kingdom
- Long title: An Act to authorise the construction of Railways in the county of Renfrew.
- Citation: 60 & 61 Vict. c. clxxv

Dates
- Royal assent: 6 August 1897

Text of statute as originally enacted

This was preceded on 6 August 1897 when the Paisley and Barrhead District Railway was authorised by the Paisley and Barrhead District Railway Act 1897 (60 & 61 Vict. c. clxxv). It was nominally independent, but friendly to the Caledonian, and was intended as a competitive response to the G&SWR route. It was to be a complex system amounting to over 12 miles (20 km), making several linkages with existing lines. It was supported by the Caledonian Railway: £132,000 of the £188,000 capital was provided by the larger company.

Its route was to leave the Caledonian Railway's Greenock line at Paisley St James and turn south to the foot of the Gleniffer Braes, then east, turning south again to enter the centre of Barrhead. Unlike the G&SWR scheme, it was to continue beyond Barrhead, and was to join the Lanarkshire and Ayrshire Railway, authorised in the same parliamentary session, at a junction between Neilston and Cathcart.

A second arm of the network was to connect with the Glasgow and Paisley Joint Railway by a triangular junction immediately east of Paisley Gilmour Street, running south and joining the other section at a junction at Blackbyres, a short distance north of Barrhead. This section would give access for coal traffic from the Lanarkshire pits directly to Paisley, and was to be double track to handle the heavy trains.

Construction of the line started on 15 August 1898. The route had been designed to skirt existing heavily built up areas, and construction was easy except in the approaches to Barrhead and Paisley East: here the possible alignment was limited by the hilly topography, the River Levern, the existing Kilmarnock line, and the authorised G&SWR line. Two massive stone viaducts were required in Barrhead. (The town of 9,000 inhabitants was to have four passenger stations.) An enormous stone wall was built along the length of Lacy Street in Paisley to take the line to Paisley East as can be seen in the bridge photograph on this page.

Having subscribed two-thirds of the original capital of the company in 1898 the Caledonian put in a further £80,000 in 1900, and obtained the Caledonian Railway Act 1901 (1 Edw. 7. c. cxx) giving authority for an extension of time for construction in 1901. It acquired the company outright by the Caledonian Railway Act 1902 (2 Edw. 7. c. cxlvi) of 31 July, while construction was still in progress. The G&SWR Barrhead Central station, on its line from Paisley, opened on 1 October 1902.

A further extension of time for the Paisley and Barrhead District Railway was obtained in 1904.

For some time street-running tramcars had been making heavy inroads into urban and suburban passenger railway business, and electric tramcar routes were proliferating. The frequent trams, the convenience of stopping places in town and village centres, and the cheap fares were major advantages to which local railways could not respond. In May 1905 the Caledonian opposed the Paisley tramway operation's proposed route from Paisley to Barrhead: it said that the District Railway was to open on 1 June 1905, and that the company had spent £720,000 on the Paisley lines; the company said that it "made a feature of workmen's trains".

=== Opening and route ===
The tramway was authorised, and the desperate struggle to compete for local passenger business was obviously lost; the Caledonian reviewed its position, and although the passenger stations were substantially complete, it decided not to open the line for passengers. The western section, from Paisley St James to Blackbyres and Lyon Cross was opened in 1905 for goods traffic only. The eastern section suffered a similar fate; it was opened in 1906 from Paisley East station, some distance south of the Joint Line at Gallowhill, to Blackbyres. The west and east curves that would have linked to the joint line were formed, but never connected. (Note: Some contemporary street maps show the connections as made; to avoid early obsolescence the publishers showed the planned construction, which was in the public domain, and showed it as having been completed.)

The line of route was therefore:

- Western section; single track from a triangular junction at Paisley St James; the western arm, facing Greenock, was known as the Walkinshaw Fork; from the apex at Walkinshaw South Junction, the line ran through stations at Ferguslie (in the angle between the Gilmour Street and the Canal line east of Elderslie), Stanefield and Glenfield, to Blackbyres Junction; from there the line was double track to Barrhead (New) (on Mill Road directly opposite the G&SWR terminus), and Barrhead South. The line continued to the junction with the L&AR line at Lyon Cross, and the line was laid out there to incorporate an extensive junction station; there was a short branch to Meikleriggs goods depot from Ferguslie, and a connection to Inkerman Brick Works north of that station.
- Eastern section; double track; from a triangular junction with the Glasgow and Paisley Joint Railway (not actually connected), turning west towards Gilmour Street and east to Gallowhill Junction. It had stations at Paisley East and Dykebar, where there was a short goods branch line serving the Dykebar Asylum.

The closed high level line along a high wall to Paisley East is on the right, low level to the goods yard on the left

Paisley East station was chiefly used as a coal depot for Paisley.

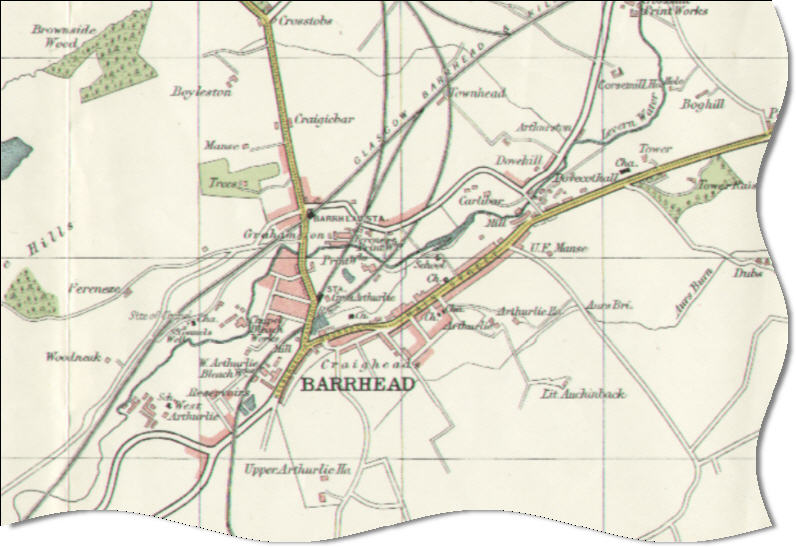
1923 map of central Barrhead showing the railway lines

Barrhead South station may never have been fully formed, although the goods yard was in use; it would have been a basic conventional two platform station, located close to the present-day Deanston Avenue. Barrhead (New) was a conventional two-platform station, but Dykebar was an island platform station. Paisley South was also a two-platform station. Ferguslie, Staneley and Dykebar were to be island platform stations forming passing points on the single line, but the loop at Staneley was never connected.

=== Lyon Cross ===
Some sources suggest that the line was never completed to Lyon Cross (sometimes spelt Lyoncross) where it would have joined the L&AR line. However the six-inch Ordnance Survey map of 1915 (revised 1911) clearly shows both routes as double track with a full junction connection. This is the route by which coal for Paisley was brought in from the Lanarkshire pits; if the line had been fed from the Walkinshaw end only, that would have been a very roundabout route. A signalbox is shown, and the junction is named Lyoncross Junction. That is repeated on the 1946 plan. and 25-inch plans of the same period. The 1939 revision shows the Paisley and Barrhead line as being reduced to single track. According to Alisdair Wham, the section of track between Barrhead South and Lyoncross was never used.

=== Closures; but revival at Linwood ===
Although the envisaged passenger service never ran, the line continued for many years to serve industrial premises; at the southern end this included the Arthurlie Dyeworks and a public goods yard at Barrhead South. Beyond that point to Lyon Cross the line closed by 1952, and the Paisley arm of the line closed on 31 December 1960. Meikleriggs Goods Yard closed on 6 September 1954.

The section from Ferguslie Chain Road to Barrhead South closed on 28 October 1963.

When the Rootes Group constructed a motor car manufacturing plant at Linwood in 1961, a railway connection was laid in to serve it; it ran from the District Railway between Walkinshaw and Ferguslie. The Pressed Steel Company had opened a plant at the site making car bodies for Rootes, and they also produced body shells for railway passenger vehicles.

The line south of the Linwood connection to Ferguslie closed on 30 September 1968. The Linwood Plant was not commercially successful, and the siding connection and therefore the whole of the Paisley and Barrhead District Railway closed on 21 October 1984.

== The present day ==
The entire Paisley and Barrhead District Railway network was closed and the only remnant of its existence is the wide space between the tracks at Lyon Cross on what is now the Neilston line, intended for the junction station there.

The train shed in Dykebar Hospital was still in existence in 2007, and the course of the hospital branch line can be discerned in aerial photographs.

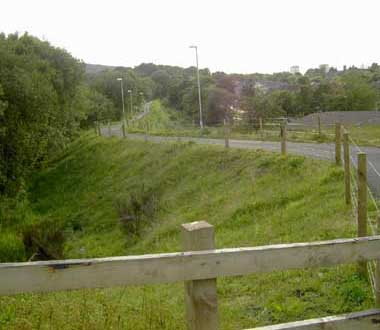
Paisley, Glenfield Road to Glenburn Road cycle track

Parts of the line are now a cycle track, built along the route of the trackbed from Glenburn to Barrhead. Glenfield station was at the bottom of the hill, a short distance up Glenburn Road from where the cycle track ends.

== Special passenger trains ==
Although the line was never used for ordinary passenger trains, occasional Sunday school outings started from the stations on the line to Clyde Coast destinations in the 1950s.

A rail tour operated by the Stephenson Locomotive Society visited the line on 1 September 1951. The train started at Paisley East Goods at Cecil Street and made its way to Barrhead South returning through the west branch to Paisley Gilmour Street.

== The Dummy Railway ==
Rowand says:

"Alas for the promoters of the railway, in the same year [as the line opened] the Paisley tramway system became electrified, offering a cheaper, more convenient mode of transport. So it was that the line became known as the 'Dummy Railway with little or no patronage'."

== Connections to other lines ==
- Glasgow, Paisley and Greenock Railway at Paisley St James
- Lanarkshire and Ayrshire Railway at Lyoncross Junction
- Glasgow and Paisley Joint Railway at Arkleston Junction - planned but never completed.
