= 1974 Eastwood District Council election =

Eastwood District Council election

7 May 1974	1977 →

All 12 seats to Eastwood District Council 7 seats needed for a majority
	First party	Second party
Party	Conservative	Residents
Seats won	10	2
Popular vote	11,113	2,687
Percentage	53.6%	13.0%

Elections to Eastwood District Council were held on 7 May 1974, on the same day as the other Scottish local government elections. This was the first election to the district council following the implementation of the Local Government (Scotland) Act 1973.

The election used the 12 wards created by the Formation Electoral Arrangements in 1974. Each ward elected one councillor using first-past-the-post voting.

The Conservatives took control of the council after winning a majority. The party took 10 of the 12 seats and more than half of the popular vote. The remaining two seats were won by Residents Association candidates.

== Background ==
Prior to 1974, the area that was to become Eastwood was part of the County of Renfrew. Although there were seven burghs in the County of Renfrew, none were located in the area that would become Eastwood. Burghs had some controls over local government depending on their size with the rest of the local government responsibility falling to the county council.

Following the recommendations in the Wheatly Report, the old system of counties and burghs – which had resulted in a mishmash of local government areas in which some small burghs had larger populations but far fewer responsibilities than some large burghs and even counties – was to be replaced by a new system of regional and district councils. The Local Government (Scotland) Act 1973 implemented most of the recommendations in the Wheatly Report. The eastern part of the County of Renfrew which included Giffnock, Newton Mearns and Eaglesham was placed into the Eastwood district within the Strathclyde region.

== Results ==
1974 Eastwood District Council election result
Party	Seats	Gains	Losses	Net gain/loss	Seats %	Votes %	Votes	+/−
Conservative	10			N/A	83.3	53.6	11,113	N/A
Residents	2			N/A	16.7	13.0	2,687	N/A
Liberal	0			N/A	0.0	27.5	5,707	N/A
Labour	0			N/A	0.0	3.8	796	N/A
Independent	0			N/A	0.0	2.1	431	N/A

== Aftermath ==
Eastwood was one of two districts in the newly created Strathclyde region that was won by the Conservatives after the party took 10 of the 12 seats. The remaining two seats were won by Residents Association candidates. Labour won control of the regional council which held its first election on the same day. Across Scotland, Labour won the most votes, the most seats and the most councils of any party.
