= 1977 Eastwood District Council election =

1977 Scottish local government election

Elections for the Eastwood District Council took place on 1 May 1977, alongside elections to the councils of Scotland's various other districts.

The Conservatives maintained their dominance of the council, winning all but 2 of the Districts seats.

== Aggregate results ==
Eastwood District Council election, 1977
Party	Seats	Gains	Losses	Net gain/loss	Seats %	Votes %	Votes	+/−
Conservative	10					58.2	5,904	
Ratepayers	2					26.0	2,640	
Labour	0	0			0.0	0.0	0	
Liberal	0	0			0.0	4.7	480	
SNP	0	0			0.0	11.0	1,112	

== Ward results ==
1st, Giffnock East
Party	Candidate	Votes	%	±%
Conservative	T Greig	1,320	78.9	
Liberal Democrats	I Miller	352	21.1	
Majority		968	57.8	
Turnout		1,672		
Conservative hold		Swing		

2nd, Giffnock West
Party	Candidate	Votes	%	±%
Conservative	W. Dundas	Unopposed	N/A	N/A
Conservative hold				

3rd, Giffnock South
Party	Candidate	Votes	%	±%
Conservative	M. Edmondson	Unopposed	N/A	N/A
Conservative hold				

4th, Thornliebank
Party	Candidate	Votes	%	±%
Conservative	I. Robertson	1,248		
SNP				
Majority				
Turnout				
Conservative hold		Swing		

11th, Busby
Party	Candidate	Votes	%	±%
Ratepayers		1,298		
Conservative		811		
Majority		487		
Turnout				
Conservative hold		Swing		

12th, Clarkston
Party	Candidate	Votes	%	±%
Conservative	C. Grant	1,175		
SNP		301		
Majority		874		
Turnout				
Conservative hold		Swing		
