= Patterton =

Coordinates: 55°47′22.6″N 4°19′59.4″W

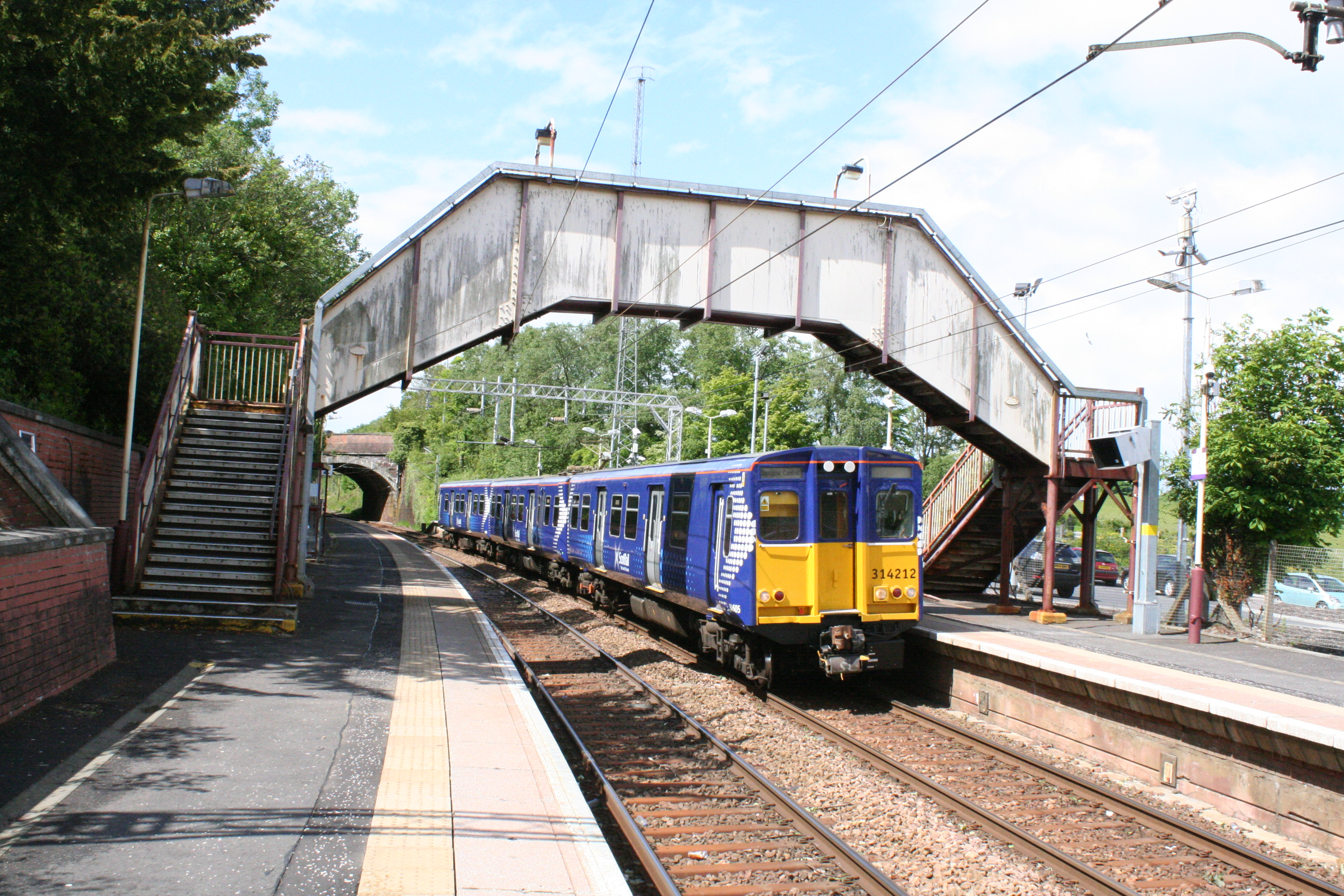
Patterton railway station with Class 314 - 314212 - on 11:36 Neilston to Glasgow Central train (Saturday 28 May 2011)

Patterton is an area on the northern edge the town of Newton Mearns, East Renfrewshire, and the Deaconsbank and Jennylind areas of Glasgow, Scotland.

It is served by Patterton railway station.
