= Walter Ewing Crum =

Scottish coptologist (1865–1944)

Walter Ewing Crum (22 July 1865 – 18 May 1944) was a Scottish Coptologist, or scholar in Coptic language and literature. In 1939 he completed A Coptic Dictionary, a dictionary of translations from Coptic to English.

== Early life and education ==
The eldest son of Alexander Crum of Thornliebank, Glasgow and Margaret Stewart, Crum was born in Capelrig, Renfrewshire. He attended Brighton and Eton, and graduated in 1888 from Balliol College, Oxford. He continued his studies of Egyptology in Paris with Gaston Maspero and in Berlin with Adolf Erman, who remained a lifelong friend.

His grandfathers were the chemist Walter Crum and the Scottish Episcopal Church bishop Alexander Ewing.

== Career ==
=== Early career ===
Crum's first publications in Coptic were in 1892, and his first monograph was published in 1893. From 1893 until 1910 he assisted Flinders Petrie in the teaching of ancient Egyptian and Coptic at University College London.

=== Research ===
Crum spent much of his career cataloguing various Coptic materials, including the manuscript holdings of the John Rylands Library and the British Museum.

From 1910 until 1914, Crum and his partner Margaret Hart-Davis resided in Austria, where he edited texts from the Monastery of Saint Epiphanius and began work on his Coptic dictionary. With the outbreak of the First World War, he returned to England, where Thompson joined him in work on the dictionary. The dictionary was released in six parts between 1929 and 1939.

While the dictionary was the crowning achievement of his career, Crum authored numerous other publications. The Journal of Egyptian Archaeology published bibliographies totalling 142 monographs and articles.

=== Recognition ===
He received an honorary doctorate from the University of Berlin and an honorary D.Litt. from Oxford University. He was a Fellow of the British Academy and was elected a Foreign Member of the American Philosophical Society shortly before his death. A Festschrift, Coptic Studies in Honor of Walter Ewing Crum, was published in 1950 as a special issue of the Bulletin of the Byzantine Institute of America.

== Personal life ==
Crum married Ella Sieveking, daughter of Edward Henry Sieveking, in 1896. During his time at University College, he began a relationship with Margaret ("Madge") Hart-Davis. The exposure of their affair in 1910 led to his departure from the college. Ella Crum refused a divorce on religious grounds. Hart-Davis and Walter Crum remained partners until his death, but were never married. Crum had no children.

Crum became a close friend of Henry Francis Herbert Thompson while the latter was a student at University College, and during Thompson's decline Crum served as his next of kin.

During the First World War, Crum donated half his income to charities and volunteered with the War Office.

== Works ==
- Catalogue of the Coptic manuscripts in the British Museum. British Museum (1905)
- A Coptic Dictionary. 6 vols. Oxford University/Clarendon Press, 1929–39. Repr. with introduction by James M. Robinson. Ancient Language Resources. Eugene, Oregon: Wipf and Stock, 2005. ISBN 9781597523332.
