= Daniel McGillivray Brown =

Scottish organic chemist

Daniel McGillivray Brown FRS
- Born: 3 February 1923; Giffnock, Scotland
- Died: 24 April 2012 (aged 89); Cambridge, England
- Education: Glasgow University
- Known for: Mutagenics; Structure of RNA
- Scientific career
- Workplaces: Chester Beatty Research Institute; University of Cambridge; University of California, LA; Brandeis University; Laboratory of Molecular Biology

Daniel McGillivray Brown FRS (3 February 1923 – 24 April 2012) was a Scottish nucleic acid chemist.

== Early life and career ==
Daniel McGillivray Brown was born in Giffnock on 3 February 1923, son of David Cunninghame Brown, a restaurateur, and Catherine Stewart (née McGillivray), a teacher. After Giffnock Primary School he attended Glasgow Academy and then, at age 17, Glasgow University where he studied chemistry, and received an honours degree.

In 1945 Brown moved to the Chester Beatty Research Institute, then in Chelsea, where he worked on the synthesis of heterocyclic stilbene derivatives for his PhD. Then, in 1948, Brown moved to Cambridge to join Alexander Todd’s group. He gained his second PhD in 1952. Brown was appointed lecturer in the chemistry department in 1959, and reader in 1967. He was Visiting Professor at University of California, Los Angeles 1959–60; and at Brandeis University 1966–67. He received the Sc.D in 1968, and eventually became Vice-Provost at Kings College in 1974.

In 1981 Brown took a sabbatical at the Laboratory of Molecular Biology (LMB), and then moved there permanently one year later. He retired formally from the LMB in 2002 but continued publishing until 2008.

== Contributions ==
At Cambridge, Brown set out to confirm the furanose chemical structure of the sugar part of nucleosides in natural nucleic acids, which had only been inferred at the time. He and Basil Lythgoe proved this to be the case. He later worked on the selective phosphorylation of nucleosides to form nucleotides. This was the beginning of a lifelong career, and led to the chemical structures of RNA and, by inference, DNA. He later worked on phosphoinositides and the mutagenesis of nucleotides.

== Personal life ==
Daniel Brown met Margaret Joyce Herbert at Scottish Highland Dancing classes at the CUSRC in 1952. They married in Lincolnshire the following year. Dan and Margaret had four children: Catherine (1954), David (1955), Frances (1961) and Moira (1962).

Daniel McGillivray Brown died at his home in Cambridge on 24 April 2012. He was survived by his wife, three daughters, four grandchildren and a great grand-daughter.

== Honors ==
Brown became a Fellow of the Royal Society in 1982.
