= Arden, Glasgow =

Coordinates: 55.806998°N 4.330532°W

Arden: Scottish Gaelic: Àirdean; Scots: Airden
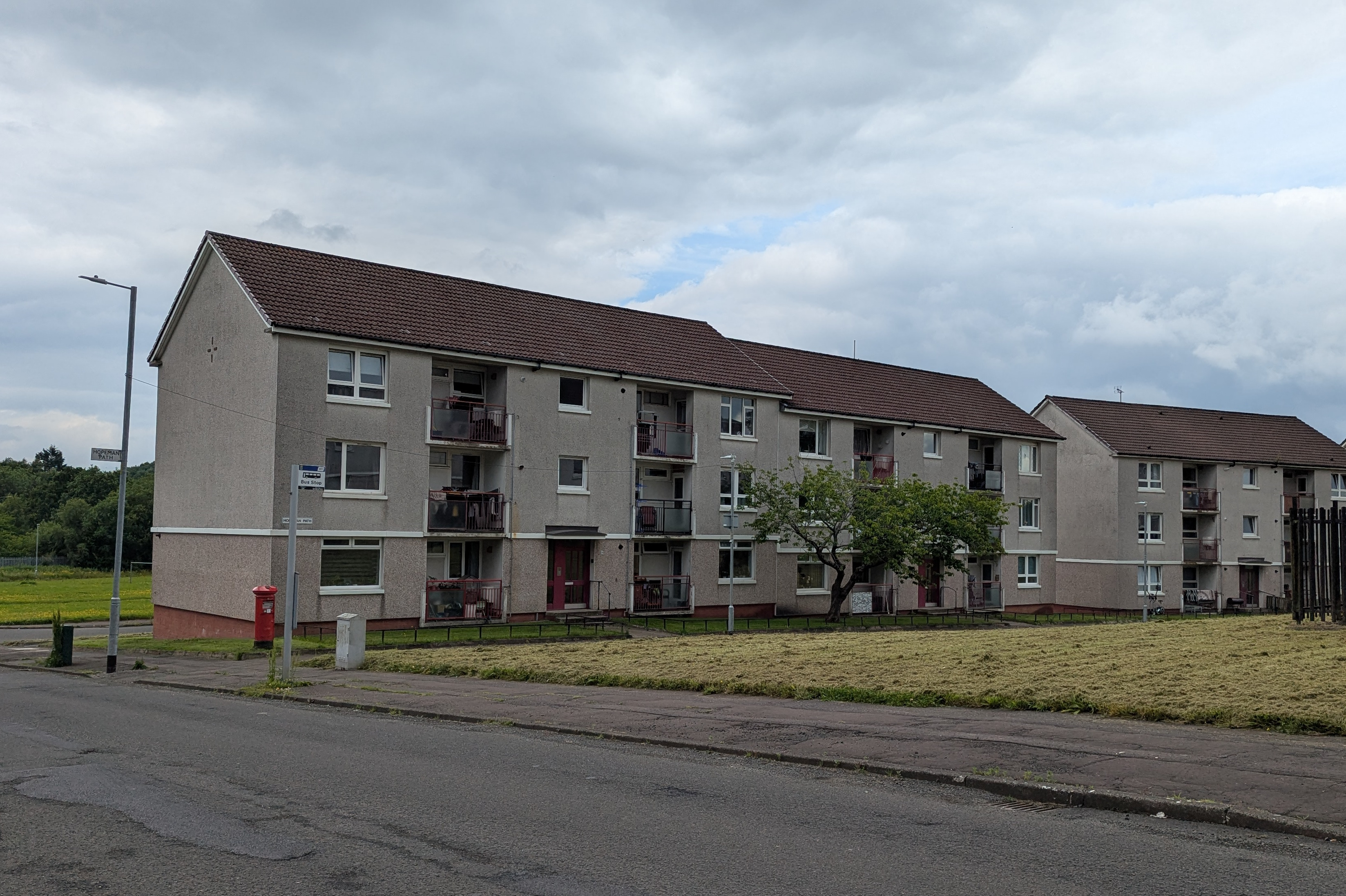
- Hopeman path flats

- Location within Glasgow
- OS grid reference: NS540597
- Council area: Glasgow City Council
- Lieutenancy area: Glasgow
- Country: Scotland
- Sovereign state: United Kingdom
- Post town: GLASGOW
- Postcode district: G46 8
- Dialling code: 0141
- Police: Scotland
- Fire: Scottish
- Ambulance: Scottish
- UK Parliament: Glasgow South West
- Scottish Parliament: Glasgow Cathcart and Pollok

Arden (UK: /ˌɑːrˈdɛn/) is a medium-sized housing estate on the south-western edge of the city of Glasgow, Scotland. The M77 motorway runs directly to the west of the neighbourhood, with Junction 3 serving the area; a small industrial estate is located to the south-east (this falls within Glasgow although is named after the neighbouring settlement of Thornliebank in East Renfrewshire). The residential area of Carnwadric is to the north-east of Arden, and the Jenny Lind part of Deaconsbank to the south, while the land to the north is open ground (formerly Kennishead Farm) and woodland.

== History ==
Historically, Arden was a farm and formed part of Sir John Maxwell's land, one of approximately seven adjoining holdings which were situated on ancient Stewart land, originally granted to Walter Stewart, 6th High Steward of Scotland by Robert the Bruce upon his marriage to Marjorie Bruce, the King's eldest daughter. Arden is near Thornliebank, a village formed on the river to manufacture cloth and a specialized printing of cloth known as beetling; Thornliebank linen was quite famous from the early-nineteenth century until the closure of the mill, in or around 1920. The building adjoining part of what is now Arden was used as a Prisoner of War (POW) camp during the Second World War.

The S.S.H.A (Scottish Special Housing Association) built the estate (consisting mostly of four-storey tenements with a common close entrance) between 1953 and 1957 to rehouse families from the old, overcrowded inner city tenements. Arden became very run-down during the 1970s and 1980s, with grants made for its refurbishment. It is not quite completed but is much improved. The shopping area containing around six businesses is in immediate need of investment and refurbishment. In 1999, the estate was bought by Glen Oaks Housing Association for a rumoured £6 million but the association has since acknowledged this may have been a rather inflated sum, and they have struggled to make necessary repairs as they are funded only by rents.

== Amenities ==
Arden became the first housing scheme to have a public house (The Cuillins) privately built in 1964–1965 which then became a brewery pub in 1968.

Arden boasts the new Ashpark Primary School which opened on 2 December 2008 and replaced the former Arden Primary School and Carnwadric Primary School. The second school, St. Louise Primary was merged with the newly rebuilt St. Vincent's Primary in Carnwadric, St. Louise's closed in June 2009 and the buildings subsequently demolished.

The nearest railway station is Kennishead, named after another of Sir John Maxwell's farms.

== In popular culture ==
Arden featured in the documentary programme Colin and Justin on the Estate which looked at the efforts to improve the area. Some of the current and former residents of Arden, were concerned about the slant of the show, and were particularly annoyed by the fact that the producers of the show concentrated their attention on housing units that were scheduled for demolition and not on housing that had seen extensive and successful renovation. Alasdair McKee, Glen Oaks chief executive, concluded however, that the program was a success and "the improvements have helped to convince people that we can make a difference" and contributed to a waiting list of people wanting to get into the estate.

== Social deprivation ==
Over the years, the area has gained a reputation as a well documented centre of social deprivation, particularly the southern area near Nitshill Road. The life expectancy for males in this part of the city is around 60 years, as a result of the 'Glasgow effect'.

== Gallery ==
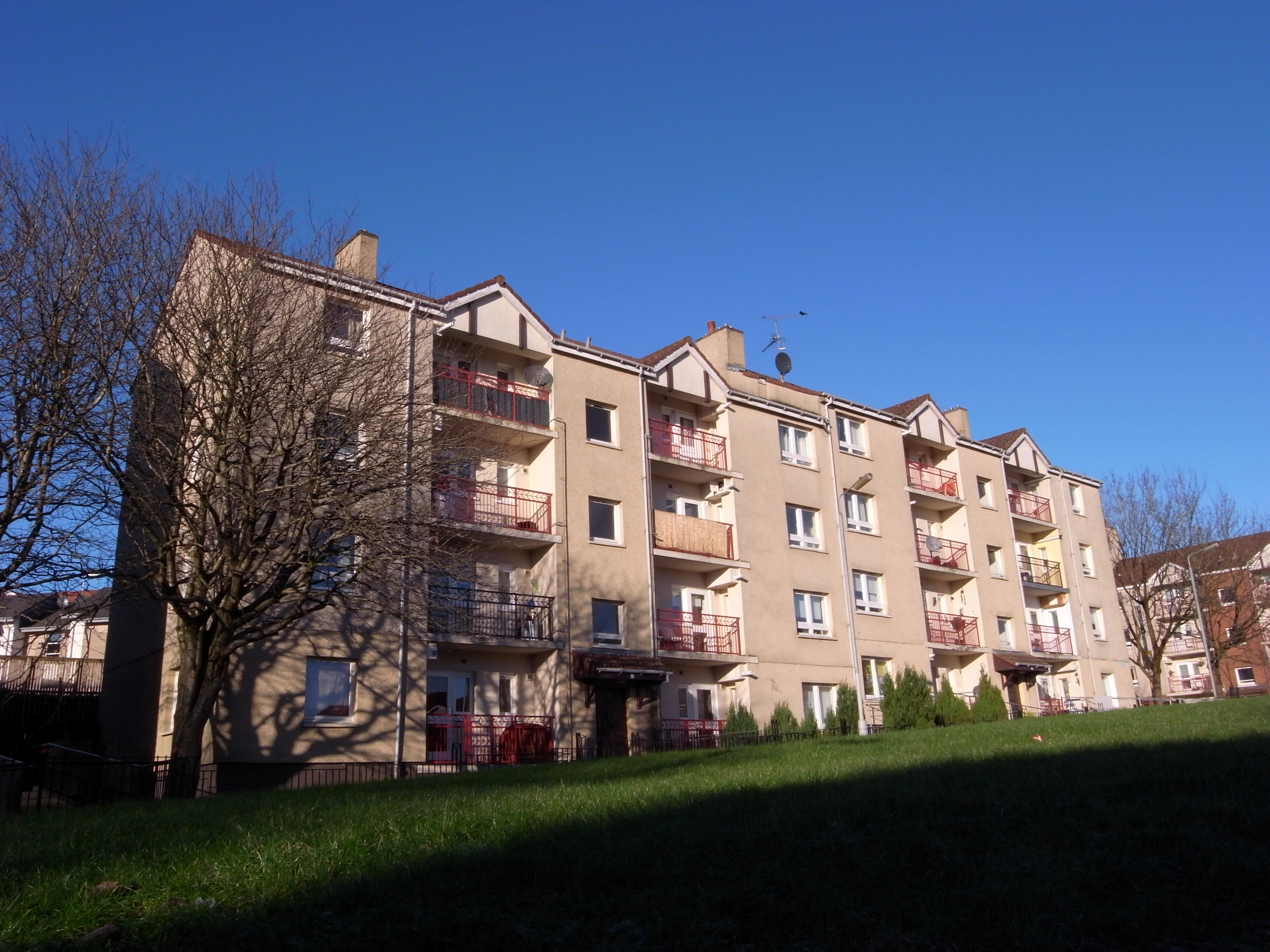
Housing. 95-97 Kyleakin Road.

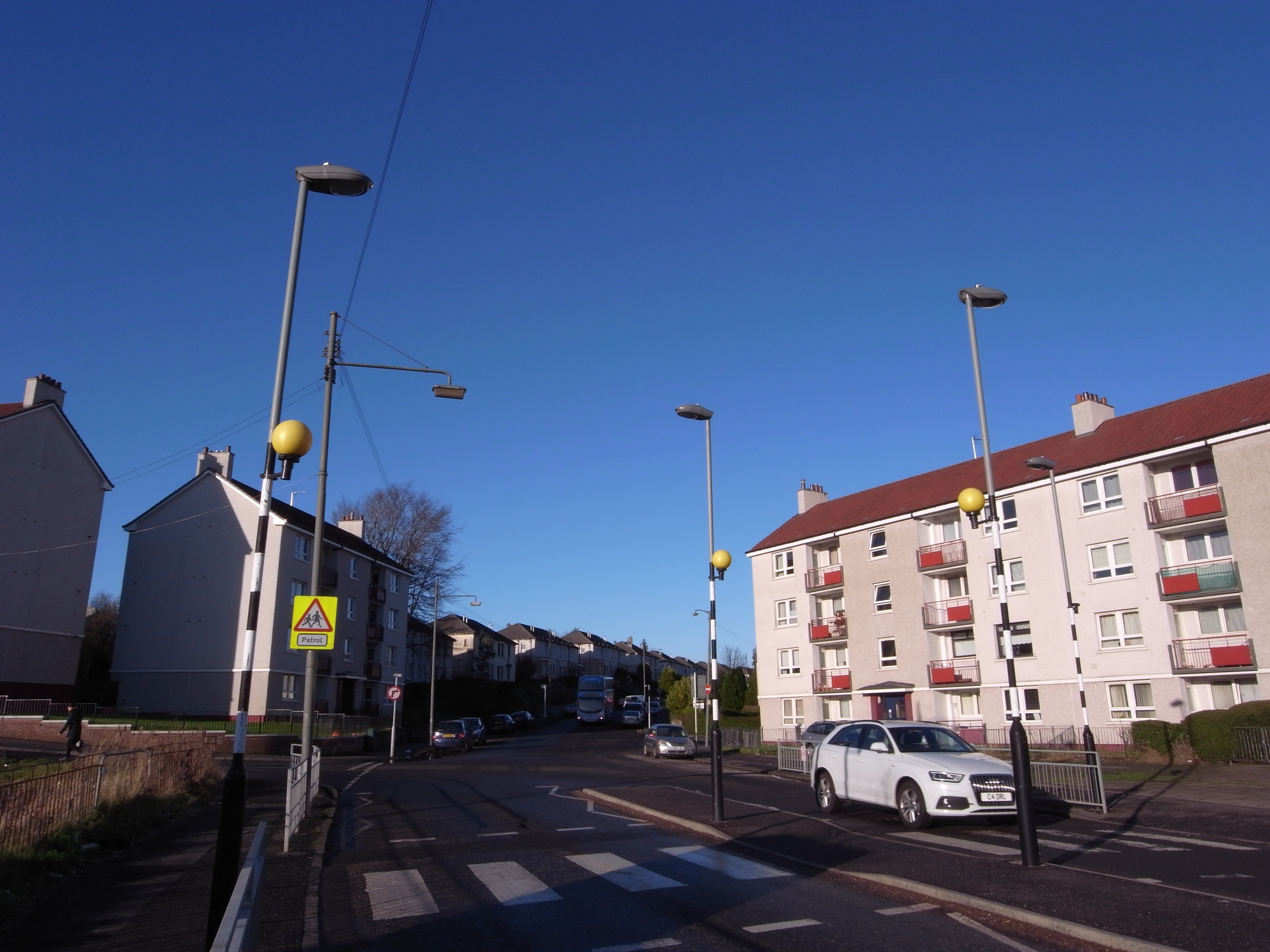
Housing. Carnwadric Road.

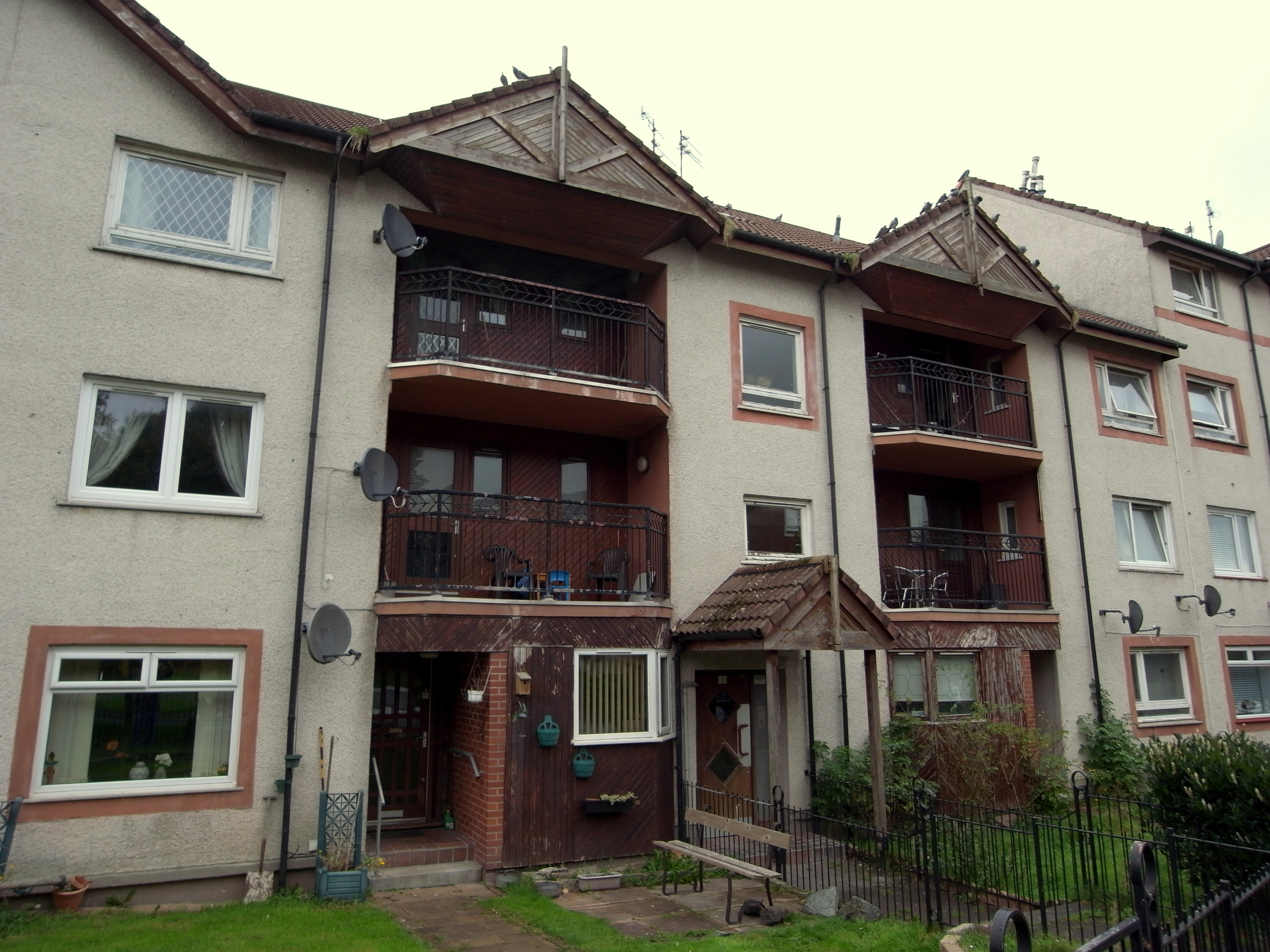
Housing. 1 Kilmiur Road.

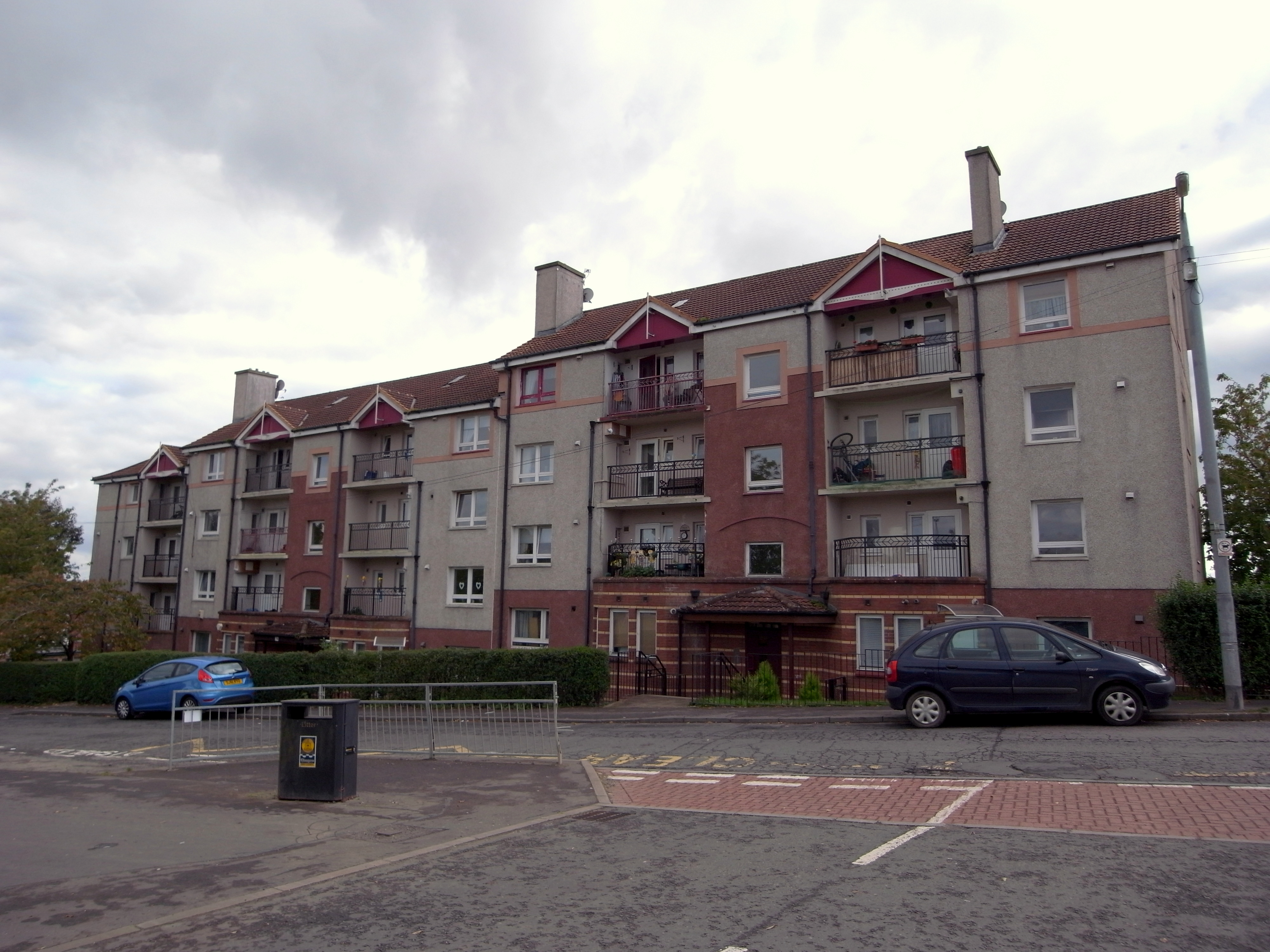
Housing. 72-74 Kyleakin Road.

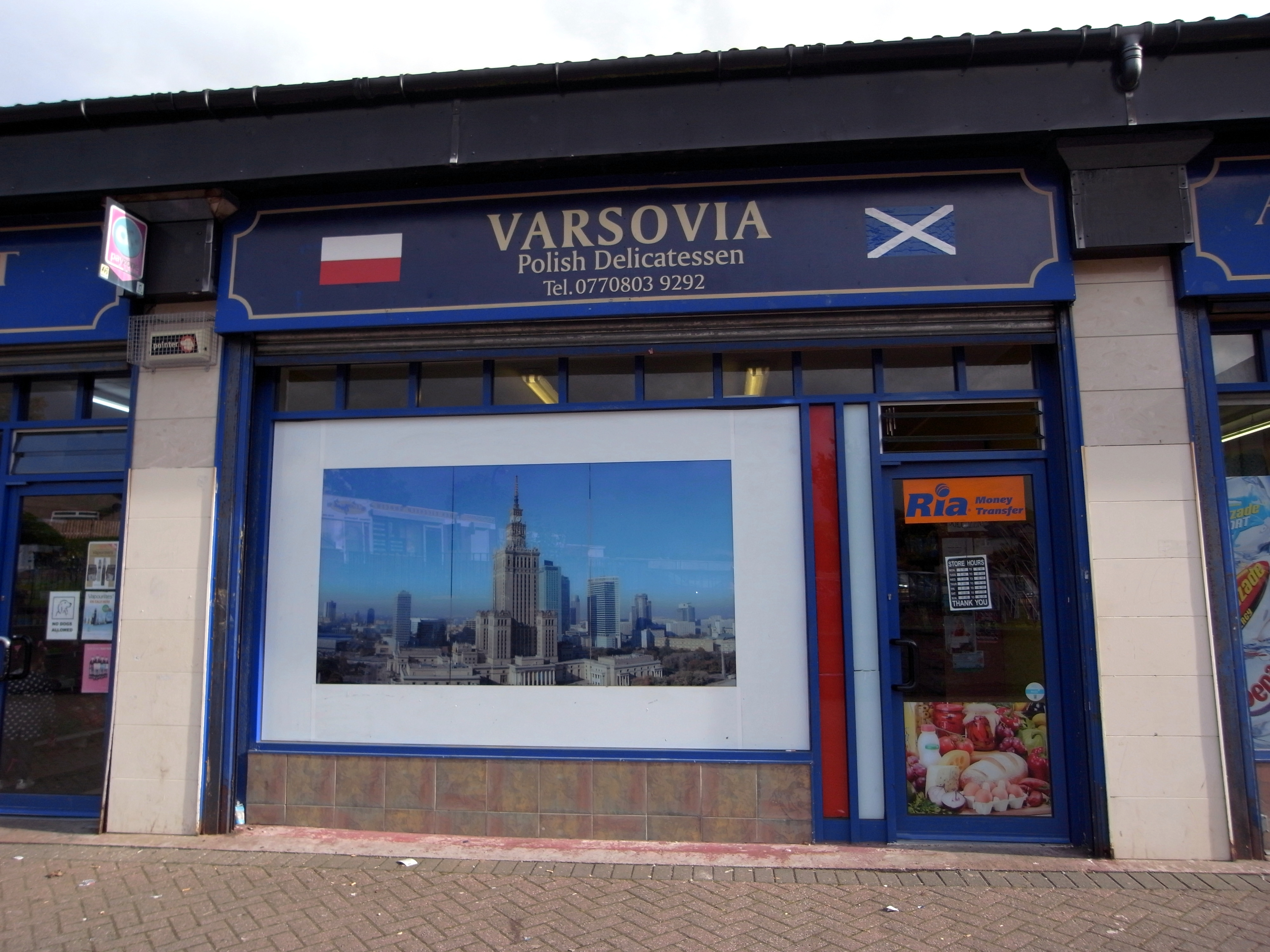
Polish Shop "Varsovia". 9 Kilmaluag Terrace.

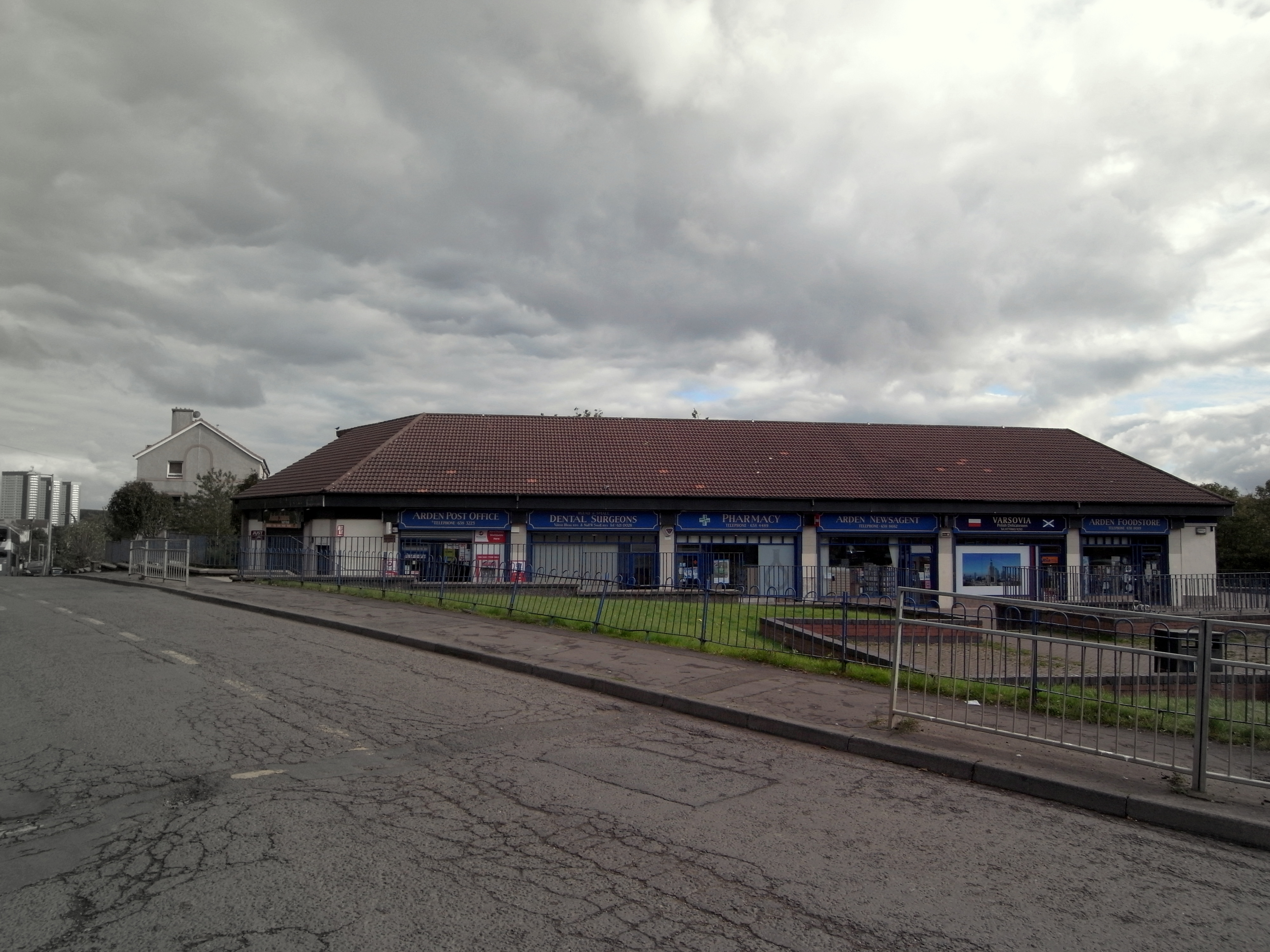
Shops between Kilmaluag Terrace and Kyleakin Road.

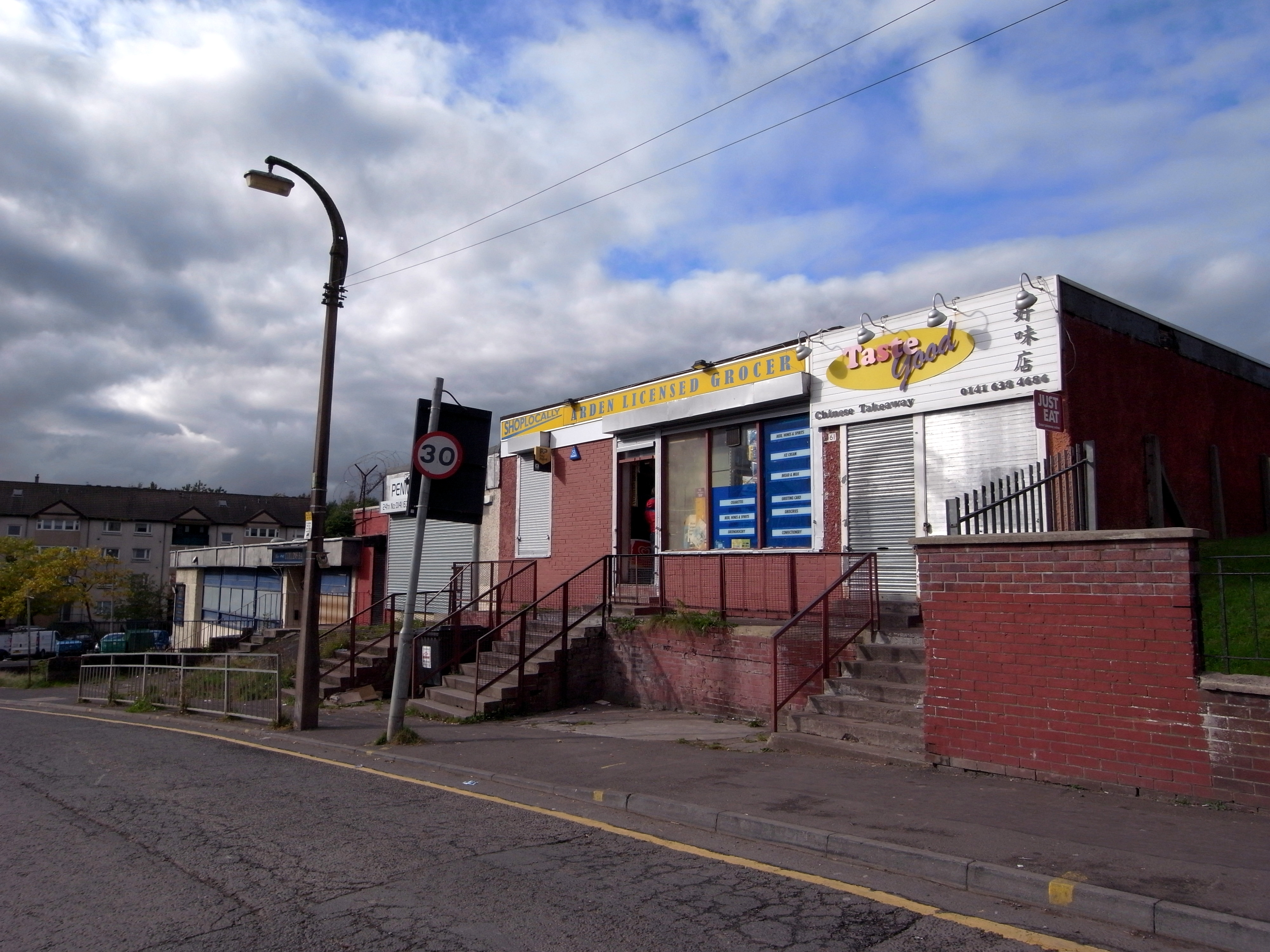
Grocery store. 59 Kyleakin Road.

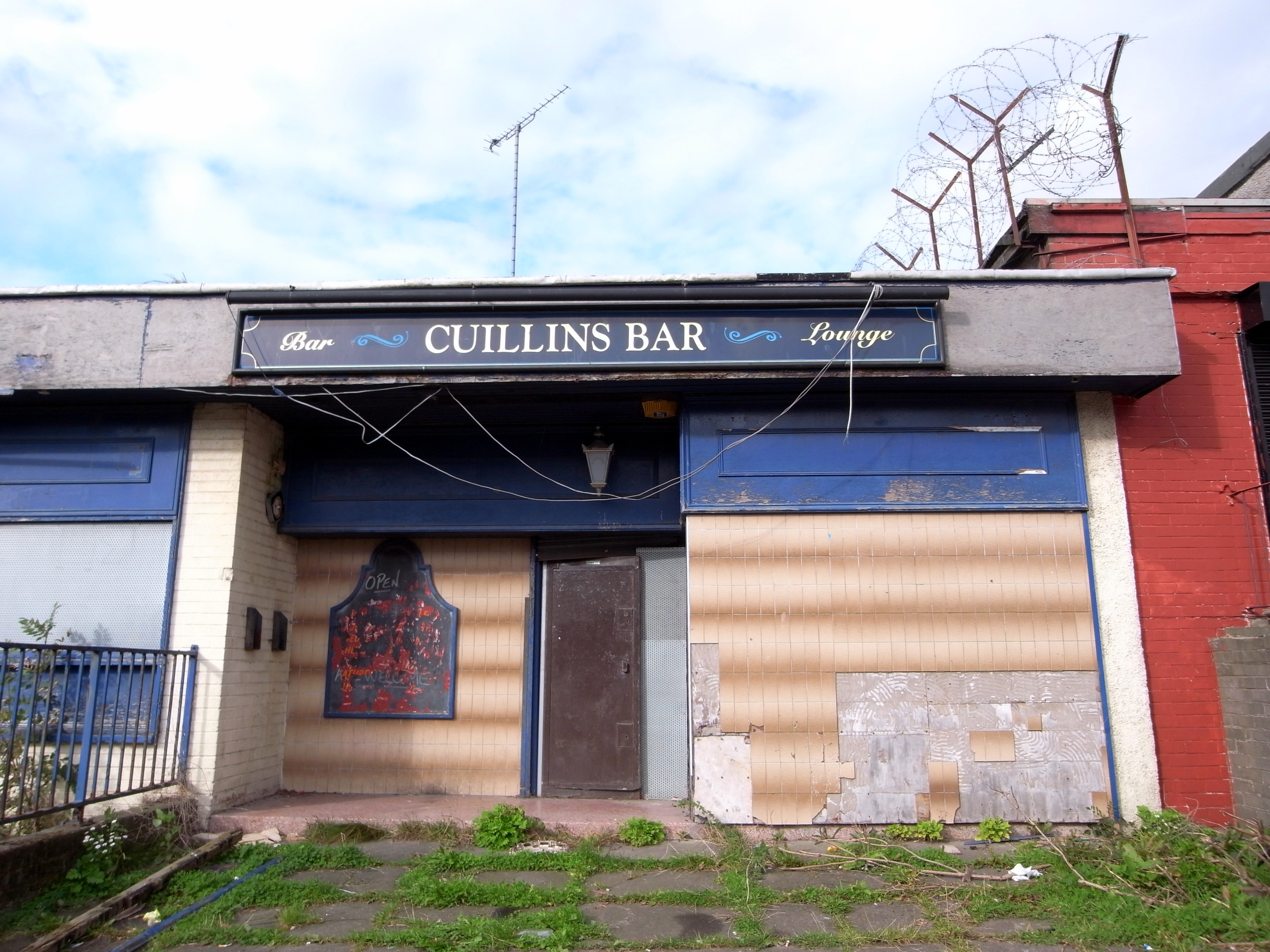
Cuillins Bar. 51–53 Kyleakin Road.

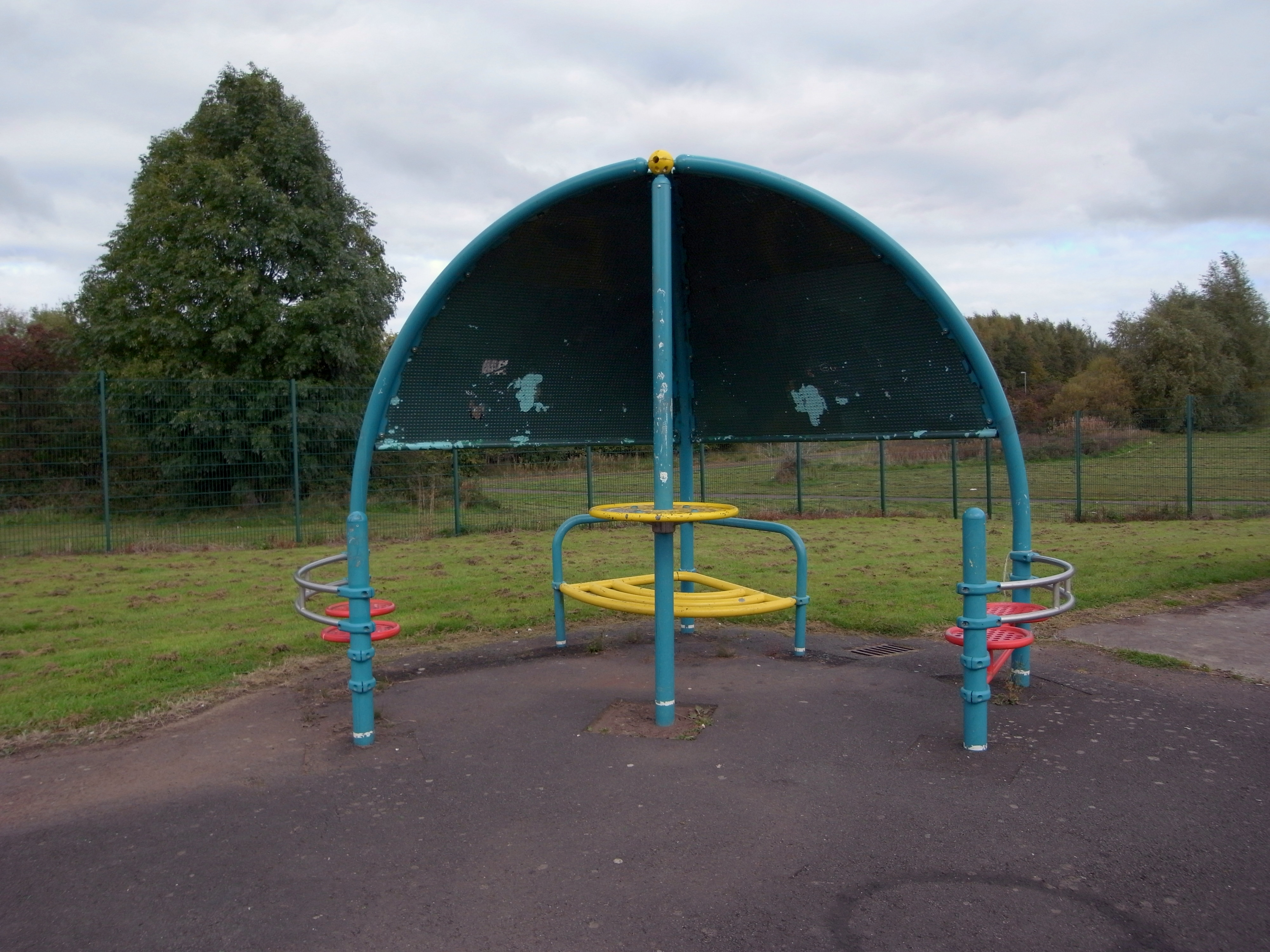
Playground. Bench. Kilmuir Crescent.

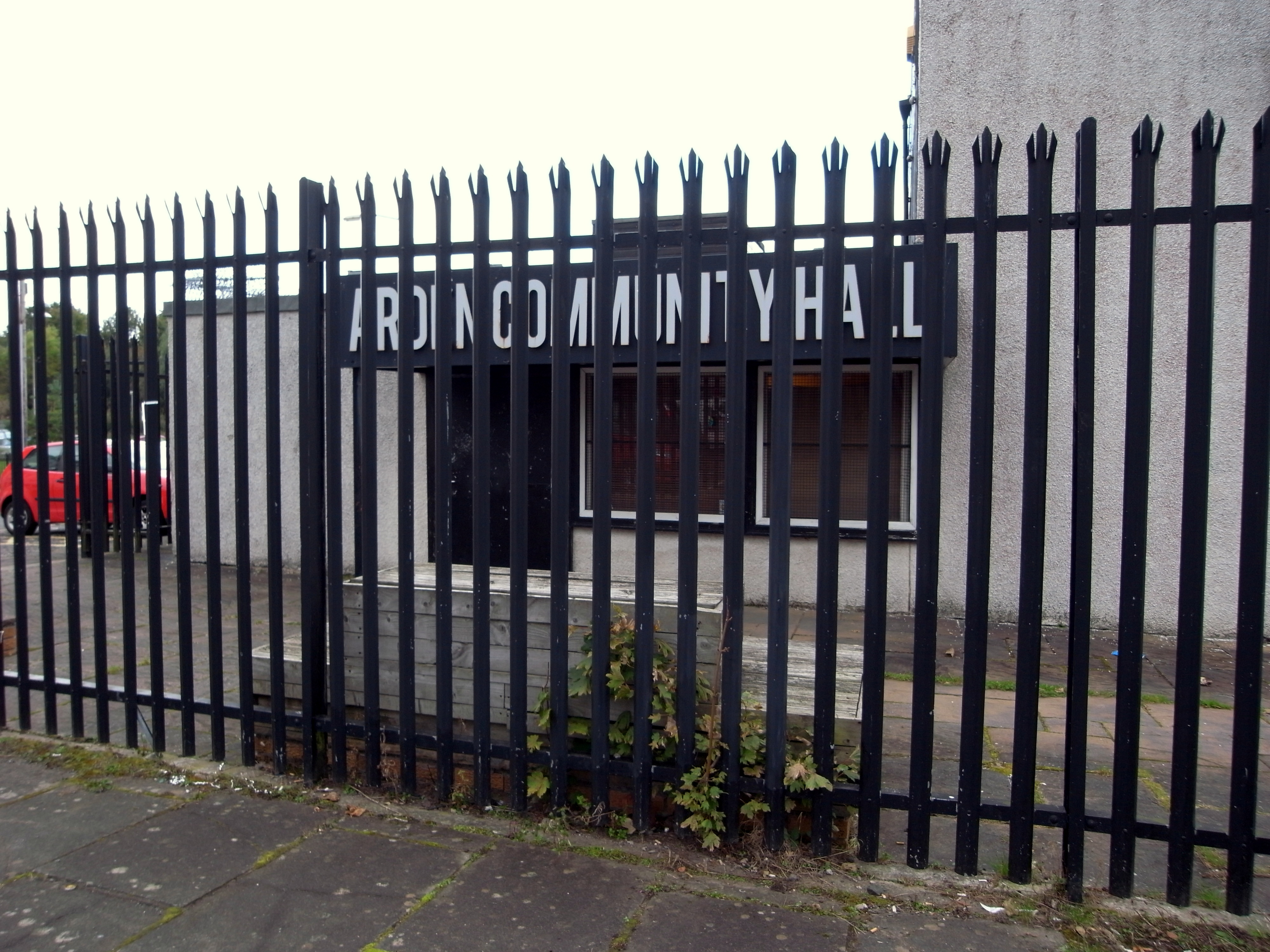
Arden Community Hall. 7 Kilmuir Drive.
