= Walter Crum =

Scottish chemist and businessman (1796-1867)

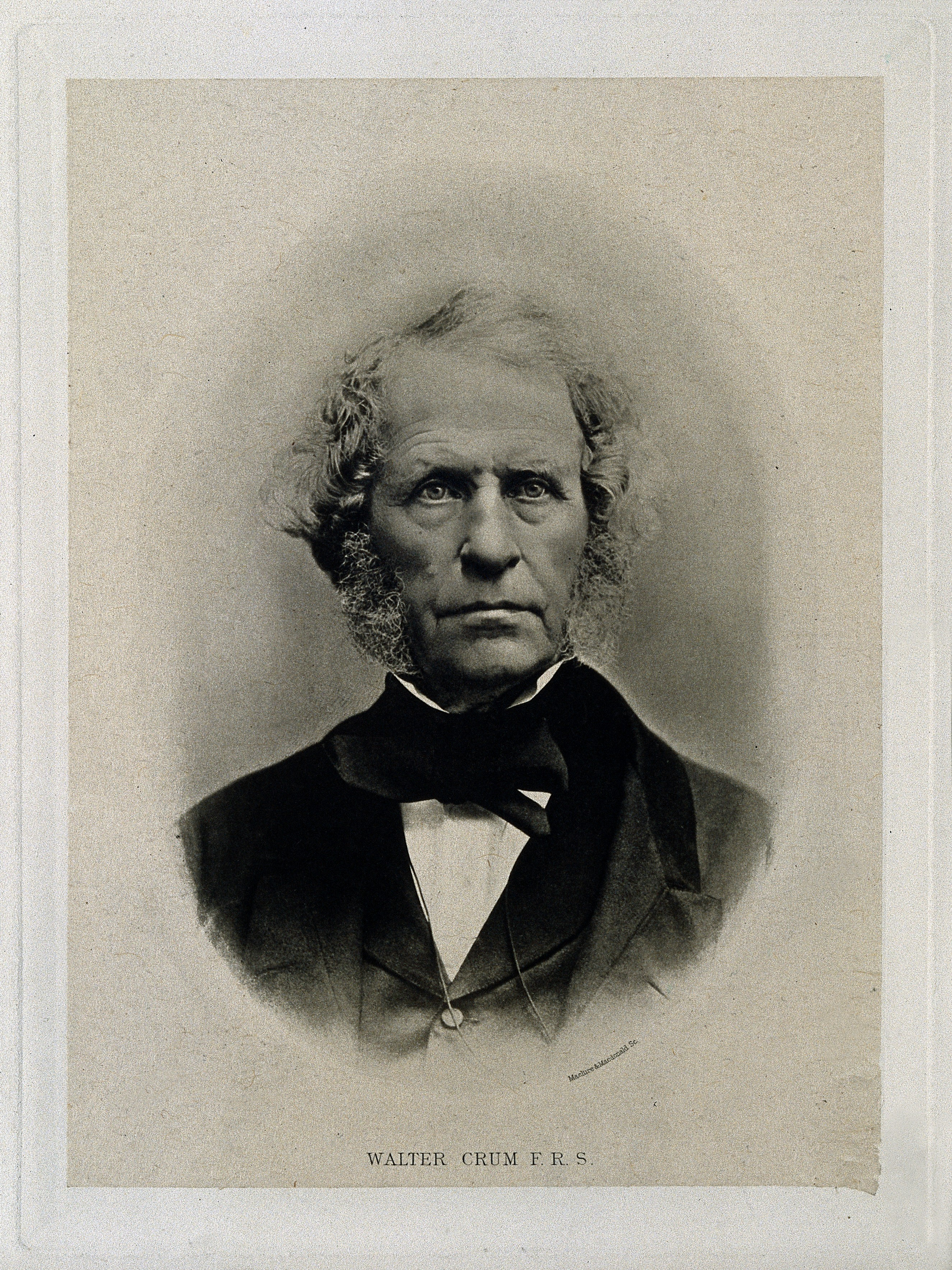
- Walter Crum Photograph
- Born: Walter Crum; 1796; Glasgow, Scotland
- Died: 1867 (aged 70–71); Rouken Glen (near Glasgow), Scotland
- Occupations: Chemist, industrialist
- Known for: Scottish chemist and textile businessman; Fellow of the Royal Society
- Spouse: Jessie Graham
- Children: Alexander Crum, William Graham Crum, Elisabeth Graham Crum, Margaret Crum, Walter Ewing Crum, Mary Gray, Jessie Crum
- Awards: Fellow of the Royal Society (1844)

Walter Crum FRS (1796 – 5 May 1867) was a Scottish chemist and industrialist. He became a Fellow of the Royal Society in 1844.

== Life ==
He was born in Glasgow, the second son of Alexander Crum of Thornliebank, a merchant there, and of Jane, the eldest daughter of Walter Ewing Maclae; the politician Humphrey Ewing Crum-Ewing was his younger brother. His sister Margaret Fisher Crum married John Brown as his second wife, and was mother of Alexander Crum Brown.

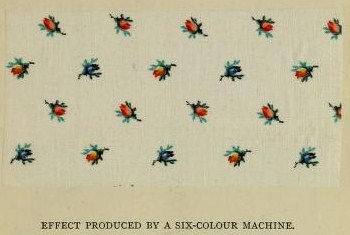
Calico print by Walter Crum & Co.

Walter Crum studied at Anderson's University under Thomas Graham. He then worked for James Thomson for two years before going into the same business, the printing of calico, on his own account. He directed the existing family firm at Thornliebank, already large employers, into dyeing, particularly with Turkey red.

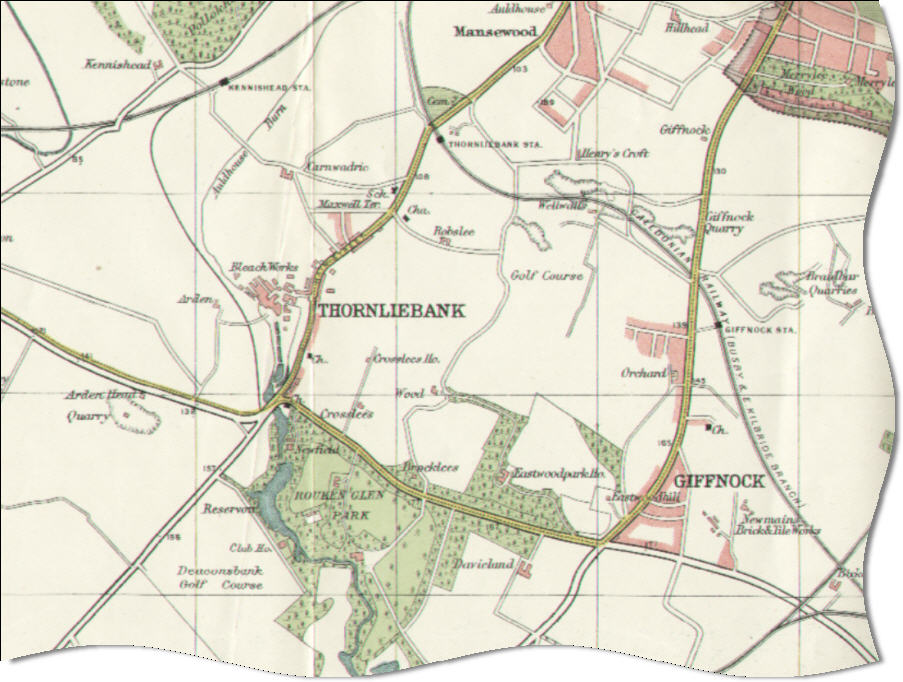
Map showing Thornliebank, the bleach works, and Rouken Glen Park.

Crum purchased the Birkenshaw Estate (later Rouken Glen Park). He was an early collector of photographs.

== Family ==
Crum married Jessie, daughter of William Graham. Their children included:

- Alexander Crum MP, who married Margaret Stewart (Nina), eldest daughter of Alexander Ewing, and was father of Walter Ewing Crum.
- William Graham Crum, who married Jean, youngest daughter of John McLeod Campbell, in 1868. He sold the Rouken Glen Estate to Cameron Corbett in 1904, who gave it to the people of Glasgow. A calico printer, he lived for some time at Mere Old Hall near Knutsford, Cheshire, where his son John Macleod Campbell Crum was born, and later at Broxton Old Hall, also in Cheshire.
- Elisabeth Graham Crum, who married William Henry Houldsworth.
- Margaret Crum who married William Thomson the physicist and engineer, later 1st Baron Kelvin.
- Walter Ewing Crum, who was a merchant in Liverpool, married Sara Margaret Tinne in 1873, and died in India in 1882.
- Mary Gray, and Jessie.

== See also ==
- Dead cotton
