= Tom Jackson (footballer, born 1878) =

Scottish footballer (1878–1916)

Personal information
- Full name: Thomas Alexander Jackson
- Date of birth: 12 November 1878
- Place of birth: Thornliebank, Scotland
- Date of death: 9 October 1916 (aged 37)
- Place of death: Somme, France
- Position: Right back

Senior career*
Years	Team	Apps	(Gls)
1895–1898	Thornliebank		
1898–1910	St Mirren	200	(3)
1908–1909	→ Clyde (loan)	0	(0)
1909	→ Bathgate (loan)	0	(0)
1910–1912	St Johnstone	9	(0)
1912–1913	Motherwell	0	(0)

International career
1902–1905	Scottish League XI	3	(0)
1904–1907	Scotland	6	(0)
- * Club domestic league appearances and goals

Thomas Alexander Jackson (12 November 1878 – 9 October 1916) was a Scottish footballer who played as a right back for St Mirren, Bathgate, St Johnstone and Scotland. He is the only serving St Mirren player to have been captain of his country.

Jackson was killed in action during the Battle of the Somme in France during the First World War while serving as a private in the Argyll and Sutherland Highlanders and is buried at Adanac Military Cemetery, Miraumont.

== See also ==
- List of Scotland national football team captains
