= Patterton railway station =

Railway station in East Renfrewshire, Scotland

Patterton
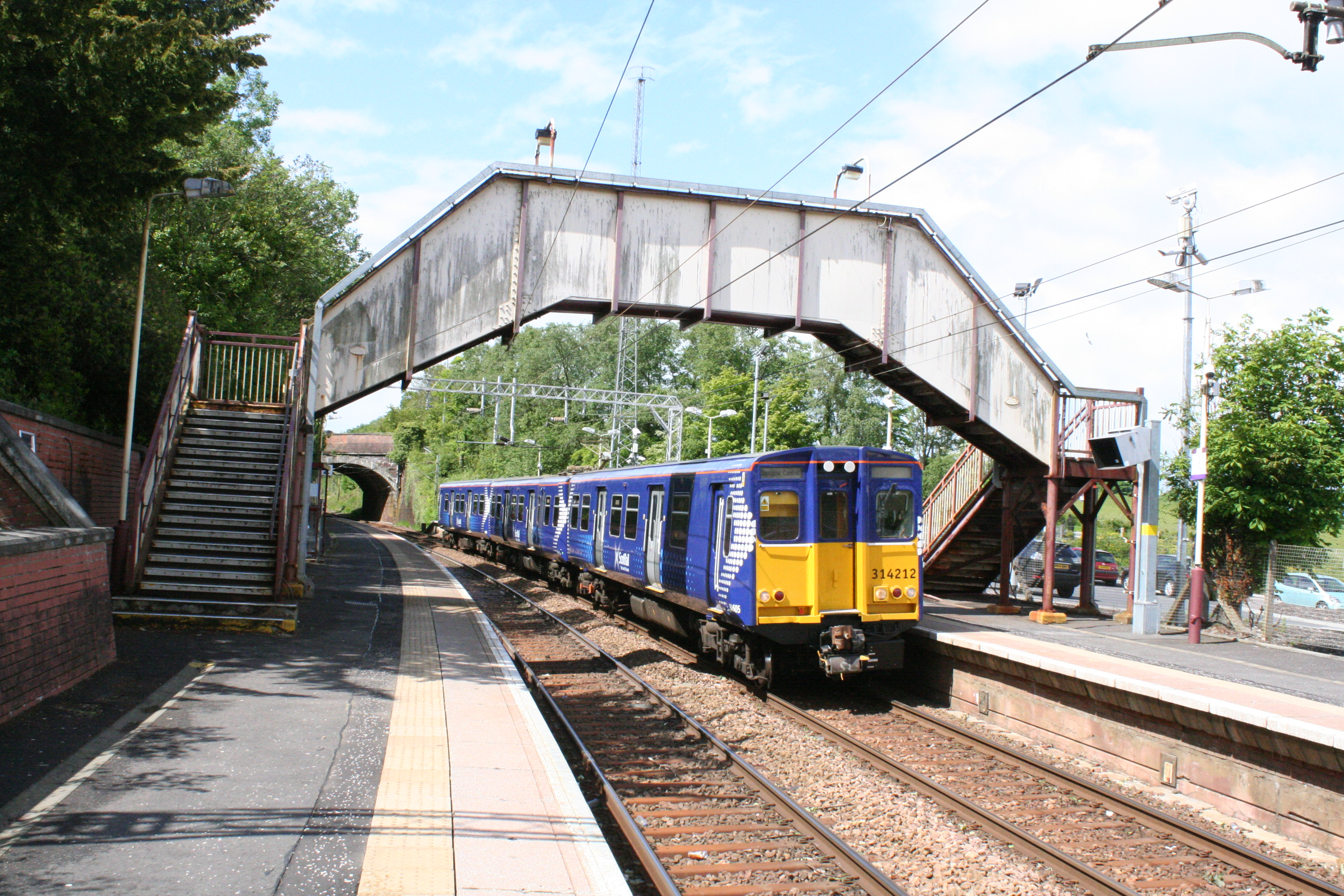

General information
- Location: Newton Mearns, East Renfrewshire; Scotland, UK
- Coordinates: 55.7906°N 4.3352°W
- Grid reference: NS536576
- Manager: ScotRail
- Transit authority: SPT
- Platforms: 2

Other information
- Station code: PTT

History
- Original company: Lanarkshire and Ayrshire Railway
- Pre-grouping: Caledonian Railway
- Post-grouping: LMS

Key dates
- 1 May 1903: Opened
- 1 January 1917: Closed
- 1 February 1919: Re-opened as Patterton for Darnley Rifle Range
- Unknown date: Renamed Patterton

Passengers
- 2021/22: ▲0.307 million
- 2022/23: ▲0.370 million
- 2023/24: ▲0.443 million
- 2024/25: ▲0.488 million
- 2025/26: ▲0.497 million
Location
- Location within East Renfrewshire
Notes
- Passenger statistics from the Office of Rail and Road

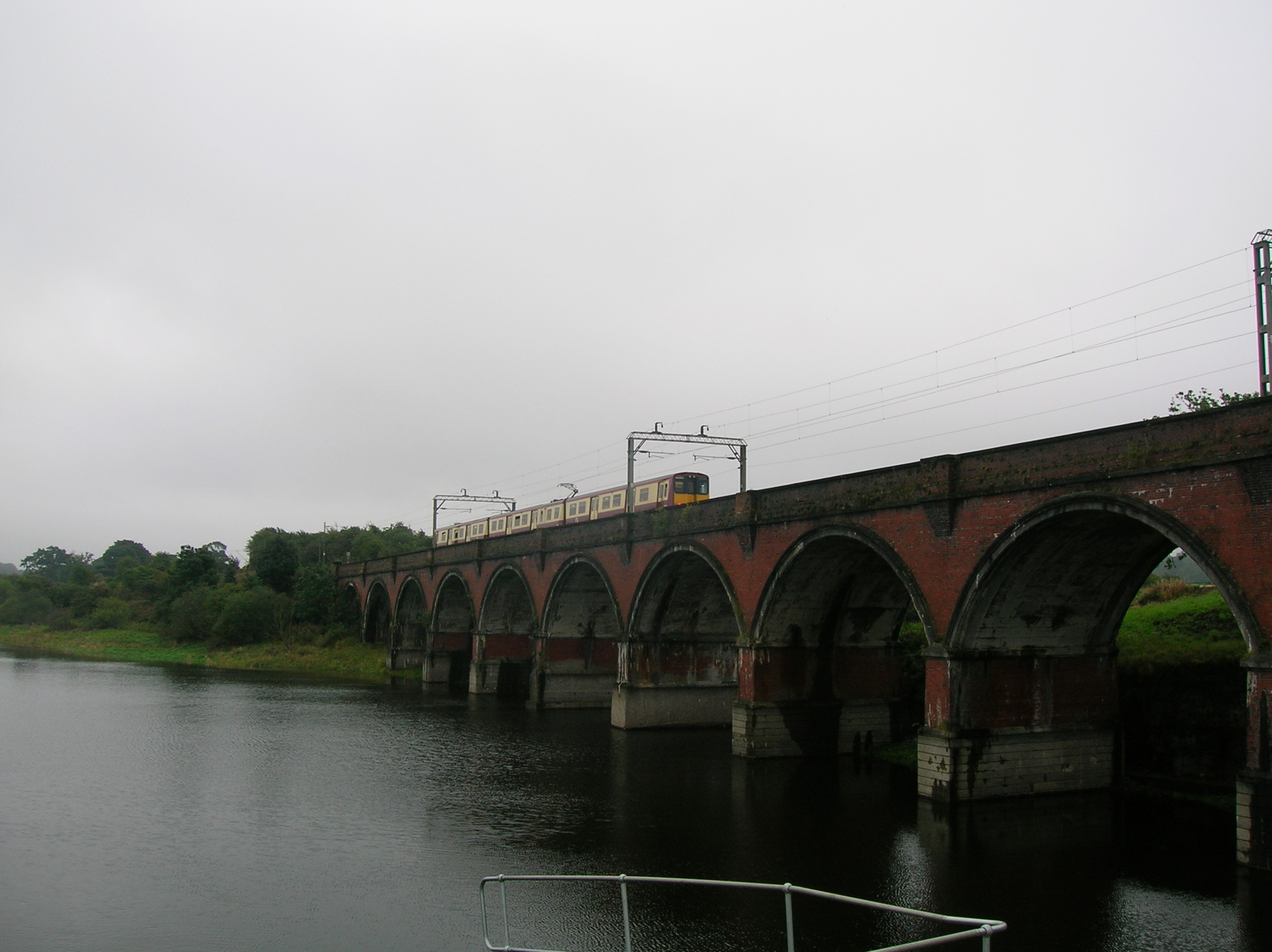
The Waulkmill Glen Reservoir Viaduct close to Patterton station

Patterton railway station is a railway station serving the Patterton, Crookfur and Greenlaw areas of the town of Newton Mearns, East Renfrewshire and the Deaconsbank and Jennylind areas of the Glasgow City council area, Scotland. The station is managed by ScotRail and lies on the Neilston branch of the Cathcart Circle Lines, 7 3/4 miles (12.5 km) southwest of Glasgow Central.

== History ==
The station was originally opened as part of the Lanarkshire and Ayrshire Railway on 1 May 1903. It closed on 1 January 1917 due to wartime economy, and reopened on 1 February 1919 as Patterton for Darnley Rifle Range (sometimes referred to as simply Patterton for Darnley). It was renamed back to Patterton by British Rail.

== Facilities ==
The station is unstaffed and only has shelters on each platform. A ticket machine is available to allow passengers to purchase their ticket before boarding the train. A long-line P.A and digital information displays provide train running information. The station footbridge is not accessible for disabled users, but there is step-free access to each platform via ramps from the nearby road.

== Services ==
Patterton is an intermediate station on the Glasgow Central — Neilston line. The line was electrified in 1962. Since then the basic service has been a 30-minute service on Mondays to Saturdays, with additional peak hour services on Mondays to Fridays. In the early part of the 21st century, a 30-minute service was also provided on Sundays.

Class 303 "Blue Train" electric multiple units provided almost all train services for many years thereafter, being joined by the similar Class 311. Services are now mainly operated by the Class 380 since the withdrawal of the Class 314, with occasional peak services operated by Class 318 and Class 320.

Preceding station	National Rail	Following station
Balgray	ScotRail; Cathcart Circle Lines	Whitecraigs
	Historical railways	
Lyoncross; Line open; station never constructed	Caledonian Railway; Lanarkshire and Ayrshire Railway	Whitecraigs; Line and station open

== Fire ==
On 24 February 2009, during repair works to a nearby bridge, a road laying vehicle caught fire which then spread to a gas mains pipe on the bridge. Soon after, the area was evacuated and all services through Patterton were suspended until the blaze was brought under control. During the suspension of services, passengers alighted at Cathcart railway station to a replacement bus service.
