= Giffnock =

Town in East Renfrewshire, Scotland

Giffnock: Scottish Gaelic: Giofnag; Scots: Giffnock
- Town and administrative centre
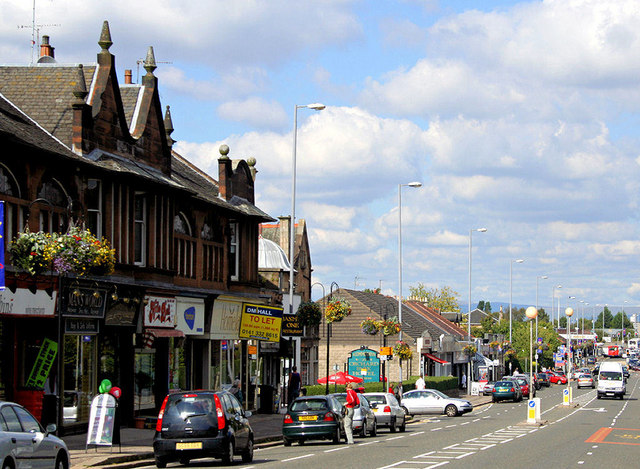
- Shops on Fenwick Road

- Location within East Renfrewshire Giffnock (East Renfrewshire)
- Population: 12,250 (2020)
- OS grid reference: NS565585
  - Edinburgh: 51 mi (82 km) ENE
  - London: 344 mi (554 km) SSE
- Council area: East Renfrewshire
- Lieutenancy area: Renfrewshire
- Country: Scotland
- Sovereign state: United Kingdom
- Post town: GLASGOW
- Postcode district: G46
- Dialling code: 0141
- Police: Scotland
- Fire: Scottish
- Ambulance: Scottish
- UK Parliament: East Renfrewshire
- Scottish Parliament: Eastwood

Giffnock (/ˈɡɪfnək/; Scots: Giffnock; Scottish Gaelic: Giofnag, pronounced [ˈkʲifnak]) is a town and the administrative centre of East Renfrewshire in the Central Lowlands of Scotland.

It lies 3.7 miles (6.0 km) east of Barrhead, 5.6 miles (9.0 km) east-southeast of Paisley and 5.3 miles (8.5 km) northwest of East Kilbride, at the southwest of the Greater Glasgow conurbation.

Giffnock has frequently been named amongst the least deprived areas in Scotland. It had been first place but that title went to Stockbridge, Edinburgh in 2020. Together with adjoining Newton Mearns and Clarkston it forms part of one of Glasgow's wealthiest outer suburban areas.

Giffnock is mentioned in documents as early as the seventeenth century as a scattered agricultural settlement. In the late eighteenth century, Archibald Montgomerie, the Earl of Eglinton, was forced to partition the land into a number of smaller properties.

The urbanisation and development of Giffnock began in the mid to late nineteenth century with the construction of several sandstone quarries, and this prompted the development of the first railway link with nearby Glasgow. Large-scale quarrying continued in Giffnock for almost a century. However, the quarrying ceased by the 1920s, and other uses were found for the quarries. An additional railway service began at the start of the twentieth century, closely followed by the arrival of Glasgow Corporation Tramways. Giffnock's relative closeness to Glasgow coupled with the local industry and good transports links helped it to develop into a suburban town, as many wealthy merchants chose to construct villas in its smog-free environs and commute daily to the city.

Although heavy industry died out in the area during the early twentieth century, as part of Scotland's densely populated Central Belt, Giffnock has continued to grow as a dormitory town, supported by its position within the Greater Glasgow area, from roughly 1,425 residents in the early twentieth century to 16,178 in 2001. Expansion continues due to several new housing developments; however, much of the land is now urbanised or designated parkland, leaving little room for further expansion.

== History ==
The Scottish Gaelic name for Giffnock is Giofnag and is of partially Brythonic and Gaelic origin. 'Cefn' (i.e. 'Giff') comes from the Brythonic meaning 'ridge' and the Gaelic cnoc (i.e. 'nock') meaning "hill". In Gaelic, oc or og is a diminutive, and thus when added to cefn gives Giffnock the meaning of "Little Ridge".

The first written mention of Giffnock came in 1530, when James V presented Rockend (Ruken) Mill and the surrounding lands to Hugh Montgomerie, 1st Earl of Eglinton. The settlement of Giffnock first appeared as Gisnock, in an atlas created by Dutch cartographer Joan Blaeu in 1654, the first atlas of Scotland. Giffnock was primarily a scattered farming community until the late 1780s, when Archibald Montgomerie, 11th Earl of Eglinton was forced to partition the land into a number of small properties for sale to raise finances.

=== Industry ===
In 1835, the first sandstone quarry in Giffnock opened. Before long, the town became known for this industry, and at its peak, there were four quarries in Giffnock, three surface quarries and one underground quarry, which together employed over 1,000 men. The quarries produced two types of sandstone: "liver rock" and "moor rock". "Liver rock" was particularly popular with masons thanks to its lack of stratification, which made the stone easy to work with.

In 1854 Giffnock and Orchard Quarries were taken over by the former foreman and clerk, De Hort Baird and William Stevenson. They formed the firm Baird & Stevenson, which became a major force in Scottish quarrying; they later owned Locharbriggs Quarry in Dumfriesshire, thus supplying Glasgow with both blond Giffnock and red Dumfries sandstone. By 1866 the Busby Railway was built, allowing them to transport the stone by rail. Originally, a lower level line was laid from Giffnock railway station into the Orchard Quarry to facilitate the extraction of the stone.

Sandstone from the Giffnock quarries was primarily used within the nearby city of Glasgow and can be found in older parts of the University of Glasgow and the interior of Kelvingrove Art Gallery. A small amount of trade was done with Belfast, and some of the finer "liver rock" was even transported as far as America and South Africa to build both buildings and monuments.

Quarrying in Giffnock continued until 1912 when, due to flooding and the high cost of extracting stone, work ceased. Numerous ventures tried to revitalise the quarries for other purposes, including the cultivation of mushrooms in the tunnels. As the pits began to fill with water, it became an issue that needed to be resolved. In the early 1930s, William Bearmore & Co began tipping slag from the production of steel into the Giffnock quarries. The slag tipping continued until 1969, when Derek Crouch Limited began scrap metal extraction, which lasted until the late 1970s. Today the ground is a wasteland.

Coal mining was also carried out in Giffnock, between 1850 and 1926. The coal produced was of a very poor quality and was of little value to householders. The main use of Giffnock coal was with commercial and industrial customers such as Busby Gas Works.

=== Urbanisation and expansion ===
The opening of Giffnock railway station in 1866 allowed business people to build sandstone villas and commute daily to the city. At the time, it was much more desirable to live in Giffnock than to live in the smog-polluted city. By the early 1890s, residential Giffnock began to grow around the railway station and Eastwood Toll, and by 1892 gas was introduced to the area. Gas street lamps were erected by Busby and District Gas Company in 1893; however, these were supported by a voluntary subscription that many households refused to pay, leaving many areas unlit. It was not until October 1896, when Eastwood Parish Council took over street lighting, that the area was consistently lit at night.

In 1903, two more railway stations were built on the edge of Giffnock, at Williamwood and Whitecraigs. These stations lay on the Lanarkshire and Ayrshire Railway, originally built to provide a through route from the Lanarkshire coalfields to ports such as Ardrossan on the Ayrshire coast.

The growth of Giffnock was furthered in 1905 by the arrival of the first Glasgow Corporation Tramways tram in the town. The addition of this tram link and the nearby Whitecraigs railway station helped the popularity of Giffnock as a weekend destination and lead to the opening of Rouken Glen park in 1906 by Archibald Corbett (later Lord Rowallan), the M.P. for Tradeston. The Giffnock tramline was one of Glasgow Corporation Tramways's most profitable routes; up to 15,000 travelled to Giffnock on a Sunday to visit Rouken Glen.

During the great housing boom of the late 1930s, Giffnock began to grow rapidly. Between 1930 and 1940, as many as 3,000 dwellings were constructed, and the population rose dramatically, from 1,425 to 3,471 in 1939 and 9,144 in 1951.

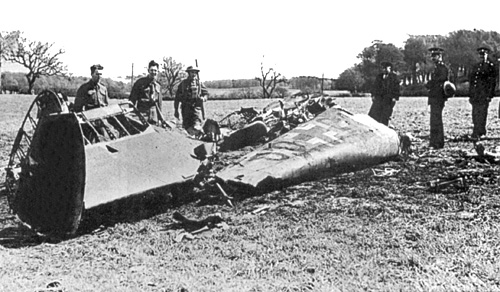
The wreckage of Hess's Bf 110 crashed at Floors Farm near Waterfoot

On 7 May 1941, during the Greenock Blitz of World War II, the Nazi German Luftwaffe dropped a group of bombs over Giffnock, but only two houses were destroyed. On 10 May 1941, Rudolf Hess, a prominent Nazi politician and deputy to Adolf Hitler parachuted out of his Messerschmitt Bf 110D near Waterfoot. Hess had flown solo to Scotland in an attempt to negotiate peace with the United Kingdom. He was detained by the Home Guard in the battalion headquarters in the Giffnock Scout hall, where he was questioned by Major Donald, the Assistant Group Officer of the Glasgow Royal Observer Corps before being transferred to Maryhill Barracks in Glasgow the following day. The wreckage of Hess's aircraft was salvaged by 63 Maintenance Unit (MU) between 11 and 16 May 1941. Part of the aeroplane is now in London's Imperial War Museum.

Proposals were put forward in 2008 to expand the town with the building of 178 houses on the currently dangerous Braidbar Quarries site next to Huntly Park, involving the Park closing for a period of two years. However, following 2,000 objections from local people and the opposition of the Scottish Government's reporter, East Renfrewshire Council abandoned the plans in October 2011.

== Governance ==
Giffnock is represented by several tiers of elected government. Giffnock Community Council forms the lowest tier of governance whose statutory role is to communicate local opinion to local and central government. It is one of ten community councils of the East Renfrewshire council area.

East Renfrewshire Council, the unitary local council, is based in Giffnock and is the Executive, deliberative and legislative body responsible for local governance. The Scottish Parliament is responsible for devolved matters such as education, health and justice, while reserved matters are dealt with by the Parliament of the United Kingdom.

Within East Renfrewshire, Giffnock and Thornliebank is one of five multi-member wards created in 2007, which elects three council members. For the purposes of the Scottish Parliament, Giffnock forms part of the Eastwood Constituency, which is represented by Jackson Carlaw MSP, of the Scottish Conservative Party. In the UK Parliament, Giffnock is within the county constituency of East Renfrewshire, electing one member of parliament (MP) to the House of Commons. Kirsten Oswald of the SNP was elected as MP for East Renfrewshire in the 2015 General Election. Before its creation in 2005, Giffnock was in the Eastwood Constituency.

== Geography ==
Paisley

Climate chart (precipitation, max. and min. temperature)
| J | F | M | A | M | J | J | A | S | O | N | D |
| 148 7 2 | 105 7 2 | 112 10 3 | 64 13 5 | 68 16 7 | 66 18 10 | 73 20 12 | 93 19 12 | 113 16 10 | 143 13 7 | 126 9 4 | 135 7 2 |
- █ Average max. and min. temperatures in °C
- █ Precipitation totals in mm
- Source: Met Office
Imperial conversion
| J | F | M | A | M | J | J | A | S | O | N | D |
| 5.8 44 35 | 4.1 45 35 | 4.4 49 37 | 2.5 55 41 | 2.7 61 45 | 2.6 65 50 | 2.9 67 54 | 3.6 67 53 | 4.4 62 49 | 5.6 55 44 | 5 49 39 | 5.3 44 35 |
- █ Average max. and min. temperatures in °F
- █ Precipitation totals in inches

At 55°48′9″N 4°17′43″W (55.803°, −4.30°) Giffnock is situated in Scotland's Central Lowlands. The town lies 3.7 miles (6.0 km) east of Barrhead, 5.3 miles (8.5 km) northwest of East Kilbride and 4.3 miles (6.9 km) south-southwest of Glasgow. The territory of Giffnock is contiguous with Glasgow and forms part of Greater Glasgow, the United Kingdom's fifth largest conurbation.

Giffnock is situated on the plateau that encircles Glasgow. It is at edge of the area that defines the basin that Glasgow has developed within. The underlay is composed mainly of sedimentary rocks and freestone from the Strathclyde and Clackmannan groups of early to mid Carboniferous age (354 to 316 million years). The relatively soft and easily eroded rocks have resulted in the landform in the area being mostly flat with gentle undulations. The area of Giffnock is typically around 45 metres (148 ft) to 50 metres (160 ft) above sea level, with the highest point in the area reaching 60 metres (200 ft).

Giffnock experiences a temperate maritime climate, like much of the British Isles, with relatively cool summers and mild winters. Regular but generally light precipitation occurs throughout the year.

Giffnock's built environment is characterised by its mixture of nineteenth and twentieth-century single and two-storey dwellings, most of which are semi-detached or terraced. Towards the south of Giffnock the properties are generally grander two-storey detached villas, commonly built with local sandstone many of which are now listed buildings. Giffnock is a postal district within the post town of Glasgow in the G postcode area. Giffnock consists of postcode district G46, which also extends beyond the town boundary to include neighbouring settlements Kennishead, Thornliebank, Deaconsbank, Carnwadric and Arden.

== Demography ==
Giffnock compared according to UK Census 2001
| | Giffnock | East Renfrewshire | Scotland |
|---|---|---|---|
| Total population | 16,178 | 89,311 | 5,062,011 |
| Foreign born | 5.4% | 3.8% | 3.8% |
| Over 75 years old | 9.3% | 6.9% | 7.1% |
| Unemployed | 2% | 2.5% | 3.9% |

According to the United Kingdom Census 2001, the census locality (town and sub-area) of Giffnock had a total resident population of 16,178, or 18% of the total of East Renfrewshire. The median age of males and females living in Giffnock was 39 and 43 respectively, compared to 37 and 39 years for those in the whole of Scotland. Fifty six percent were married, 3.5% were cohabiting couples, 6.9% were lone parent families and 28.7% of households were made up of individuals.

The place of birth of the town's residents was 94.4% United Kingdom (including 87.8% from Scotland), 0.6% Ireland, 0.9% from other European Union countries and 4.2% from elsewhere in the world. Compared with the average demographics of Scotland, Giffnock has higher proportions of people born outside the Europe and people over pensionable age.

Of residents 16–74, 39.6% were in full-time employment, 12.1% in part-time employment, 8.9% self-employed and 2% unemployed compared with Scotland as a whole which has 40.3%, 11.1%, 6.6% and 4% respectively. Additionally, in Giffnock 4.2% students have jobs while 5.2% do not, 16% are retired, 5.7% look after their home or family, 3.9% are permanently sick or disabled, and 2.4% are economically inactive for other reasons.

== Transport ==
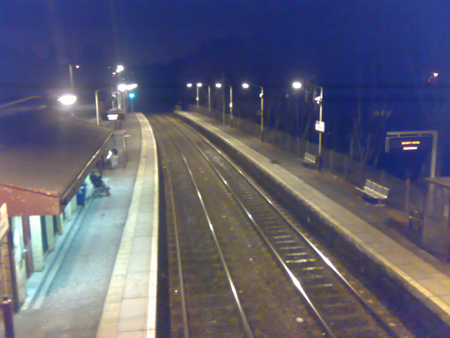
Giffnock railway station

The area has a number of high-volume road links to neighbouring Glasgow. The A77 main Glasgow to Kilmarnock road passes through the centre of the town and crosses the A727 from Paisley to East Kilbride at the Eastwood Toll. The nearest motorway is the M77, of which Junction 3 Darnley is the interchange for Giffnock.

Giffnock lies within the Strathclyde Partnership for Transport Passenger transport executive and is served by three railway stations, all of which are managed by ScotRail:

- Giffnock railway station, opened on 1 January 1866, lies on the East Kilbride branch of the Glasgow South Western Line, which runs from Glasgow Central 4 miles (6.4 km) north-northeast.
- Whitecraigs railway station, opened on 1 May 1903, lies on the Neilston branch of the Cathcart Circle 5.2 miles (8.4 km) south-southwest of Glasgow Central.
- Williamwood railway station, opened on 1 May 1903, lies on the Neilston branch of the Cathcart Circle 5.2 miles (8.4 km) south-southwest of Glasgow Central.

The closest airport is Glasgow Airport, 6.8 miles (10.9 km) north-west of Giffnock, followed by Glasgow Prestwick Airport, 27.2 miles (43.8 km).

Giffnock is serviced by a number of bus routes by various operators. The main bus link to the city is the number 38 line operated by First Glasgow, which runs at least every 10 minutes throughout the day. There is also a number 4 bus operated by Stagecoach Group offers direct services to Ayr, Kilmarnock and the Buchanan Bus Station.

== Education ==
The first evidence of education in Giffnock is of a small private school that operated in the lodge house at the Redhurst Hotel. Due to the increased population, the first public school opened in 1902 in the Tower Rooms of Giffnock United Free Church, known now as the Orchardhill Parish Church.

Giffnock has a number of high schools, including St Ninian's High School, a co-educational Roman Catholic High School which was built in 1984 and is Scotland's top-performing state school. St Ninian's was the first state-funded school in Scotland to abandon the Standard Grade examination system in favour of the Higher Still system, using Access 3, Intermediate 1 and Intermediate 2 for pupils in third and fourth year, while maintaining Highers in fifth year and Advanced Highers in sixth year. The school roll was 1784 as of September 2011.

Furthermore, Giffnock has a library and two primary schools: Giffnock Primary School and Braidbar Primary school, non-denominational feeder primary schools for Woodfarm High School.

== Culture and community ==
=== Religion ===
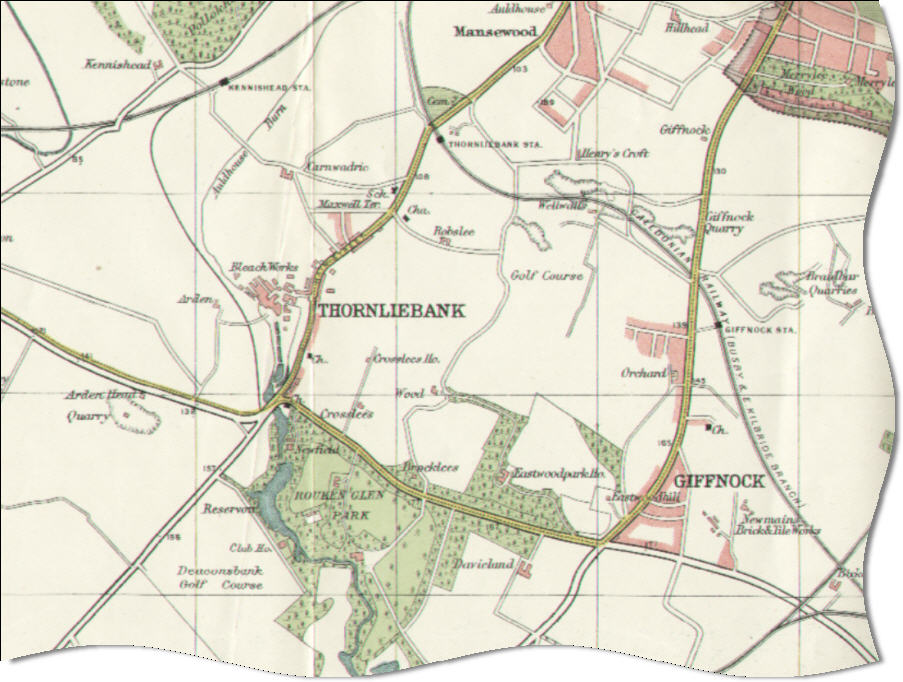
Map of Giffnock in early 1900s

Until the end of the nineteenth century, Giffnock had no church buildings, and religious meetings took place in the waiting room of Giffnock Railway Station and, later, in the clubhouse at Eastwood Golf Course. Orchardhill Parish Church, designed by HE Clifford and completed in 1899, was the first church built within Giffnock. Now a category B listed building, the Church is built in a Gothic revival style of architecture and is built mainly of locally quarried stone. Also located in Giffnock is Giffnock Synagogue, founded in 1938 and home to the largest Jewish religious congregation in Scotland.

=== Recreation ===
In 1936 the Tudor Cinema was constructed in Giffnock by Alex Frutin. It opened in December as a "superb suburban cinema". The Tudor was an Art Deco style building and is considered Glasgow's first "entertainment complex", featuring a ballroom and restaurant as well as the 2,400-seat cinema.

Giffnock has numerous parks, including Rouken Glen, Huntly Park and Eastwood Park, where the East Renfrewshire Council offices are based. There remains some ancient woodland in Giffnock, which could be as old as 8,000 years.

Panaoramic View of Fenwick Road, the main street in Giffnock.

The lands of Rouken Glen Park originally belonged to the Scottish Crown. Ownership shifted to the Earl of Eglinton when James V presented the land to Hugh Montgomerie, 1st Earl of Eglinton on the marriage of his son in 1530. The area of the estate was farmed until the end of the 18th century and, in 1858, the estate was purchased by local merchant Walter Crum. Alexander Crum inherited the estate in 1879 and is responsible for the layout of Rouken Glen as it is today. On his sudden death in August 1893, the house passed into the hands of his brother, William Graham Crum, who later sold the estate to Archibald Cameron Corbett, MP (later Lord Rowallan) on 19 May 1905. In 1906 the estate was given to the City of Glasgow by Lord Rowallan, with the provision that it be for the "citizens of Glasgow for all time". Rouken Glen Park was officially opened on Saturday, 25 May 1906 by Lord Rowallan.

Eastwood Park Leisure Centre has a 25-metre (82 ft) swimming pool, two additional smaller pools and two gyms. Activities in the leisure centre include casual swimming, swimming lessons, pool fun sessions, fitness classes, a sauna and gym sessions. Greenbank Garden, an 18th-century house and garden owned by the National Trust for Scotland, is located between nearby Clarkston and Newton Mearns. The house has a 2.5 acres (1.0 ha) walled garden, sixteen rooms and barns and stables. This building is protected as a Category A listed building.

The Giffnock North Social Club, located on Braidbar Road, is a community non-profit making venue run by its members. The club host a wide and diverse range of live music events. Facilities at the club include a lounge and a games room with pool tables, darts and large screen TV. It also has a function hall which can be hired out for special occasions, accommodating up to 150 guests.

=== Sport ===
In 1905 the Whitecraigs Golf Club was founded. The course was originally designed by Willie Fernie, who was The Open Championship winner in 1883 and also designed the Ailsa course at Turnberry. Alterations to the course were made in the 1930s by James Braid, who won The Open Championship five times between 1901 and 1910.

Many golfing events have been hosted by the Whitecraigs Golf Club. The club was visited by the United States Ryder Cup teams of 1929 and 1933. The teams included many golfing legends such as Walter Hagen, Gene Sarazen and Horton Smith. Whitecraigs hosted the World Senior Championship in 1976 and 1978. In 1983, Jack Nicklaus visited the club to play an exhibition match and run a clinic.

Whitecraigs Rugby Club is a rugby union team based at Newton Mearns, near Giffnock. As of the 2011–2012 season, the team competes in the Scottish Premiership Division A.

The Glasgow Hutchesons Aloysians RFC (often abbreviated to GHA) are based in Giffnock.

== Public services ==
Giffnock forms part of the Western water and sewerage regions of Scotland. Waste management is provided by the East Renfrewshire local council. Water supplies are provided by Scottish Water, a government-owned corporation of the Scottish Government. Giffnock's distribution network operator for electricity is Scottish Power. The NHS board is NHS Greater Glasgow and Clyde. Strathclyde Fire and Rescue is the statutory fire and rescue service. The nearest fire station is in the neighbouring settlement of Clarkston

Policing in Giffnock is provided by Police Scotland. The Strathclyde Partnership for Transport, a public body in Scotland, has direct operational responsibilities, such as supporting (and in some cases running) local bus services and managing integrated ticketing in Giffnock and other areas from the former Strathclyde region. Transport Scotland manages the local rail network.

== Notable people ==
- Gordon Brown, Prime Minister of the United Kingdom from 2007 to 2010
- Daniel McGillivray Brown, chemist
- Aiden McGeady, Ireland international footballer
- Andrew Robertson, Scotland international footballer
- Calum Gallagher, footballer
