= Whitecraigs railway station =

Railway station in East Renfrewshire, Scotland

Whitecraigs Scottish Gaelic: An Creagan Bàn
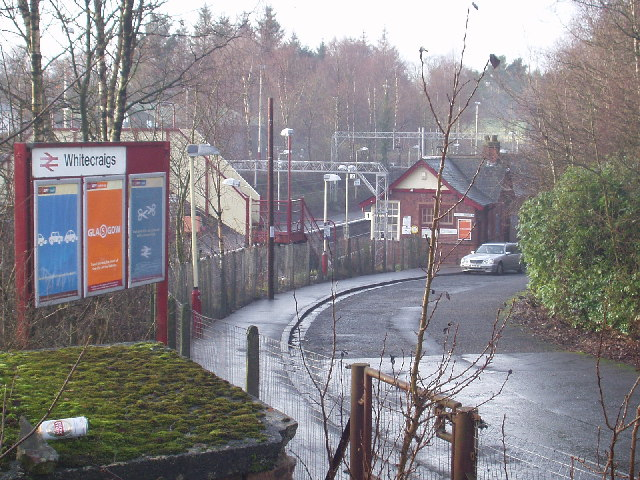

General information
- Location: Newton Mearns/Giffnock, East Renfrewshire; Scotland
- Coordinates: 55.7903°N 4.3107°W
- Grid reference: NS552576
- Manager: ScotRail
- Transit authority: SPT
- Platforms: 2

Other information
- Station code: WCR

History
- Original company: Lanarkshire and Ayrshire Railway
- Pre-grouping: Caledonian Railway
- Post-grouping: LMS

Key dates
- 1 May 1903: Opened

Passengers
- 2021/22: ▲0.152 million
- 2022/23: ▲0.215 million
- 2023/24: ▲0.278 million
- 2024/25: ▲0.321 million
- 2025/26: ▼0.315 million

Listed Building – Category C(S)
- Designated: 13 July 2015
- Reference no.: LB52351
Location
Notes
- Passenger statistics from the Office of Rail and Road

Whitecraigs railway station is a railway station serving the Whitecraigs and Davieland areas of the towns of Giffnock and Newton Mearns, East Renfrewshire, Greater Glasgow, Scotland. The station is managed by ScotRail and lies on the Neilston branch of the Cathcart Circle 6 3/4 miles (10.9 km) southwest of Glasgow Central. The line here forms the boundary which separates Newton Mearns and Giffnock across Ayr Road.

== History ==
The station was originally opened as part of the Lanarkshire and Ayrshire Railway on 1 May 1903. On some timetables the station was known as Whitecraigs for Rouken Glen. The station building is listed Category C and is notable for its Arts and Crafts decorative detailing.

== Facilities ==
The station has a ticket office, which is staffed part-time (06.55 - 13.55, Mondays to Saturdays only). A ticket machine is also provided and there is a waiting room in the main building. Digital departure screens and a P.A system provide train running information. Step-free access to both platforms is via ramps from the street and station car park, though the footbridge between the platforms has steps.

== Services ==
=== Since electrification in 1962 ===
Since the line was electrified in 1962 the basic service has been a half-hour service throughout the day (Mondays to Saturdays), with additional peak hour trains (Mondays to Fridays). From 2005 a half-hourly Sunday service has also been provided.

Class 303 "Blue Train" electric multiple units provided almost all trains services for many years thereafter, being joined by the similar Class 311 from 1967. Services are now mainly operated by the Class 380 EMUs.

| Preceding station | National Rail | Following station |
|---|---|---|
| Patterton | ScotRail; Cathcart Circle Lines | Williamwood |
| | Historical railways | |
| Patterton; Line and station open | Caledonian Railway; Lanarkshire and Ayrshire Railway | Muirend; Line and station open |
