= Giffnock Newton Mearns Synagogue =

Orthodox synagogue in Glasgow, Scotland

- The interior of the synagogue

- Location of the synagogue in Scotland

Religion
- Affiliation: Orthodox Judaism
- Rite: Nusach Ashkenaz
- Ecclesiastical or organizational status: Synagogue
- Leadership: Rabbi Moshe Rubin
- Status: Active
- Notable artwork: Stained glass windows by John K. Clark

Location
- Location: 222 Fenwick Road, Giffnock, East Renfrewshire, Glasgow, Scotland G46 6UE
- Country: United Kingdom
- Interactive map of Giffnock Newton Mearns Synagogue
- Coordinates: 55°48′14″N 4°17′42″W

Architecture
- Established: 2021 (merged congregation): 1930s (Giffnock); 1954 (Newton Mearns)
- Completed: 1968

Website
- giffnockshul.co.uk

The Giffnock Newton Mearns Synagogue, commonly known as Giffnock Shul (Yiddish: גיפנוק שול), is an Orthodox Jewish congregation and synagogue, located at 222 Fenwick Road in Giffnock, East Renfrewshire, to the south of Glasgow, Scotland, in the United Kingdom. The synagogue is the largest in Scotland and also features a religious day school for both children and teenagers.

The congregation was formed through a 2021 merger of the Giffnock Synagogue and the Newton Mearns Synagogue, to form a congregation with 850 members. The final service held in the former Newtown Mearns Synagogue, at 14 Larchfield Court, was conducted in January 2023. The new congregation worships in the Ashkenazi rite.

== History ==
The Giffnock Newlands Hebrew Congregation was founded in the early 1930s, meeting initially in the Girl Guides Hall and later in the Giffnock Police Court House, until the first synagogue, in May Terrace, was established in 1938. This building was expanded in the 1950s and used until a new expanded synagogue, on Maryville Avenue, was completed in 1968.

The Newton Mearns & District Hebrew Congregation was founded in 1954 and worshipped initially at Berkeley, Edgehill and then Beech Avenue, Newton Mearns, before completing the Newton Mearns Synagogue at 14 Larchfield Court in 1977.

Giffnock Shul is a provincial synagogue and, as an affiliate member of the United Synagogue organization of United Kingdom, the congregation is under the aegis of the Chief Rabbi of the United Hebrew Congregations.

== Spiritual leadership ==
The congregation is led by Rabbi Moshe Rubin who hails from the United States and joined the community in 1990, first serving as their cantor. He was asked to take over the pulpit in 1999, after the retirement of the Rabbi Philip Greenberg, who retired in 1998. Giffnock's cantor from 1964 to 1990 (then emeritus cantor) was Rev Ernest Levy OBE (d. August 2009). The cantor for the high holy days since 2008 has been Mr. Russell Grossman, of London.

== Membership ==
- 1938 – 350 seatholders (Jewish Year Book 1939)
- 1950 – 400 seatholders (Jewish Year Book 1951)
- 1953 – 550 seatholders (Jewish Year Book 1954)
- 1957 – 750 seatholders (Jewish Year Book 1958)
- 2007 – 700 seatholders (approximation)

== See also ==
- List of Jewish communities in the United Kingdom
- History of the Jews in Scotland
- Garnethill Synagogue
