= Eastwood, Strathclyde =

Former district in Strathclyde, Scotland

Coordinates: 55.807°N 4.295°W

Eastwood
- Eastwood district within Scotland
- Population
  - 1994: 60,600
- History
  - Created: 16 May 1975
  - Abolished: 31 March 1996
  - Succeeded by: East Renfrewshire
- Status: District
- Government: Eastwood District Council
  - HQ: Giffnock

Eastwood was a local government district in the Strathclyde region. It was derived from the civil parish of Eastwood which had been within the county of Renfrewshire, though latterly included areas which had become annexed Lanarkshire and the expanding city of Glasgow. Established in 1975, it covered the parts of the parish outside Glasgow, plus adjoining areas to the south; it was abolished in 1996 to become part of East Renfrewshire.

== History ==
Local government across mainland Scotland was reorganised in 1975 under the Local Government (Scotland) Act 1973, which replaced the counties, burghs and landward districts with a two-tier system comprising upper-tier regions and lower-tier districts. Renfrewshire County Council and the First District Council (which had covered the parishes of Eaglesham, Mearns, and the parts of the parishes of Cathcart and Eastwood outside the borders of Glasgow) were abolished. Eastwood District was created covering the same area as the former First District; it was one of nineteen districts within the Strathclyde region.

The districts and regions were all abolished in 1996 under the Local Government etc. (Scotland) Act 1994. The area of Eastwood District was merged with the Barrhead electoral division from Renfrew District to become the East Renfrewshire council area.

=== Political control ===
The first election to the district council was held in 1974, initially operating as a shadow authority alongside the outgoing authorities until it came into its powers on 16 May 1975. Throughout the council's existence the Conservatives held a majority of the seats on the council:

Party in control	Years
Conservative	1975–1996

=== Elections ===
Elections were held as follows:

Year	Seats	Conservative	Labour	Liberal Democrats	Independent / Other	Notes
1974	12	10	0	0	2	
1977	12	10	0	0	2	
1980	12	9	0	0	3	
1984	12	10	0	0	2	
1988	12	8	1	1	2	
1992	12	8	1	1	2	

1980 results map

1984 results map

1988 results map

1992 results map

=== Premises ===
The council was initially based at a converted house at 295 Fenwick Road in Giffnock. The building had previously served as the headquarters of the First District Council. The council built itself a new headquarters nearby in the grounds of Eastwood Park, moving into the new building in 1980. Following the council's abolition in 1996 the Eastwood Park building became the headquarters of the replacement East Renfrewshire Council.

== Constituencies ==
The Eastwood Westminster constituency was created in 1983, and the Eastwood Holyrood constituency, with the same boundaries, in 1999.

The Westminster constituency was renamed East Renfrewshire in 2005. The Holyrood constituency retains its original name.

== See also ==
- Subdivisions of Scotland
