= St Ninian's High School, Giffnock =

Coordinates: 55.79949°N 4.30213°W

St Ninian's High School
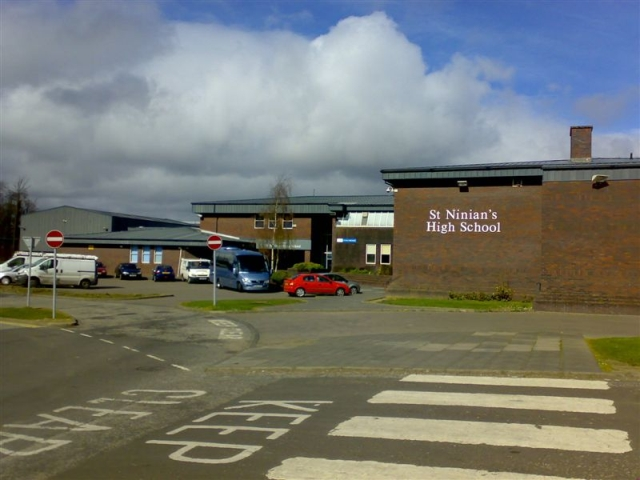

Location
- Rouken Glen Road, East Renfrewshire, G46 6UG; Giffnock, East Renfrewshire; Scotland

Information
- Type: Secondary
- Motto: "Floreat Iuventus" (Let the Youth Flourish)
- Established: 1984
- Head Teacher: Gerry O'Neil
- Enrollment: More than 2000
- Website: http://www.st-ninians.e-renfrew.sch.uk/

St Ninian's High School is a six-year co-educational Roman Catholic state high school in Giffnock, East Renfrewshire, Scotland. The school, which opened in 1984, serves Giffnock, Clarkston, Thornliebank, Newton Mearns, Eaglesham, Netherlee, Waterfoot, Netherplace, Millhall and Busby in East Renfrewshire, Scotland. The school roll was 1,714 as of September 2005, but has now risen to more than 2000 due to the schools academic success. The head teacher is Gerry O'Neil. The school's motto is "Floreat Iuventus" which translates as "Let youth flourish".

== History ==
Between 2000 and 2002, a multi-million pound extension was built for the school (which was originally designed to hold only 700 pupils). The extension had been scheduled for years earlier (and completion by 1999 at the latest) however problems with the PFI tender for another local school project caused years of delay. Another extension was completed in 2009.

In 2008, the school was given the best inspection report which at that time had been given to a Scottish secondary school, seven "excellents" and 10 "very goods".

The school was the first public-sector organisation to win the 'Quality Scotland' business excellence award;

It was the first state-funded school in Scotland to abandon the Standard Grade examination system in favour of the Higher Still system, using Access 3, Intermediate 1 and Intermediate 2 for pupils in third and fourth year, while maintaining "Highers" in fifth year and Advanced Highers in S6.

== Notable alumni ==
- Kenny Boyle, actor, playwright, and author
- Andrew Robertson, footballer currently playing for Premier League club Tottenham Hotspur and captain of the Scotland national team
- John Spencer, retired footballer who played for Chelsea, Rangers and Motherwell
- James McArdle, actor
- Aiden McGeady, retired footballer who played for Celtic and Sunderland and represented the Republic of Ireland at the international level.
- Calum Gallagher, footballer currently playing for Alloa Athletic
- Liam Lindsay, footballer currently playing for Preston North End
- Lewis Smith, footballer currently playing for Livingston
