= Thornliebank =

Coordinates: 55.806°N 4.317°W

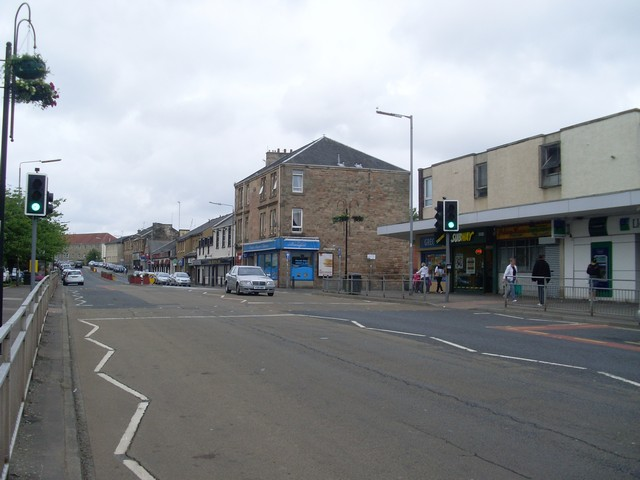
- Shops on Main Street

- Location within East Renfrewshire Thornliebank (East Renfrewshire)
- Population: 4,170 (2020)
- Council area: East Renfrewshire
- Lieutenancy area: Renfrewshire
- Country: Scotland
- Sovereign state: United Kingdom
- Post town: GLASGOW
- Postcode district: G46
- Dialling code: 0141
- Police: Scotland
- Fire: Scottish
- Ambulance: Scottish
- UK Parliament: East Renfrewshire
- Scottish Parliament: Eastwood

Thornliebank (Scots: Thonliebank, Scottish Gaelic: Bruach nan Dealgan) is an area of East Renfrewshire, in the west central Lowlands of Scotland. Part of the Greater Glasgow conurbation, it is located on the Auldhouse Burn about six miles (ten kilometres) south of Glasgow city centre, and just outside the city's administrative boundaries (the closest neighbourhoods within Glasgow, to the west and north of Thornliebank, being Arden, Carnwadric, Deaconsbank, Eastwood, Jenny Lind and Mansewood). The neighbouring East Renfrewshire town of Giffnock lies directly to the east, with Rouken Glen Park to the south.

The original village was founded in the 18th century and began to develop after the opening of a printworks in 1778, and subsequently other light industry. Despite industrial decline in the 20th century, Thornliebank continued to expand due to extensive public and private housing construction. As of the 2011 Census, the area has a population of 4,051.

== History ==
It is not known when Thornliebank was first settled although it has been ascertained that it did not exist prior to the 18th century. The village first makes its appearance on Thomas Richardson's map of 1795 and was, at the time, referred to as 'Thorny Bank', a title believed to have been inspired by the substantial number of thorn trees that were prevalent in the area. In 1789 it was a little street of cottages but it had grown by 1845, to have a population of 1366. This was largely due to the Crum family, who established and ran the Thornliebank printworks. John Crum founded the works in Main Street in 1778 to print locally woven linen.

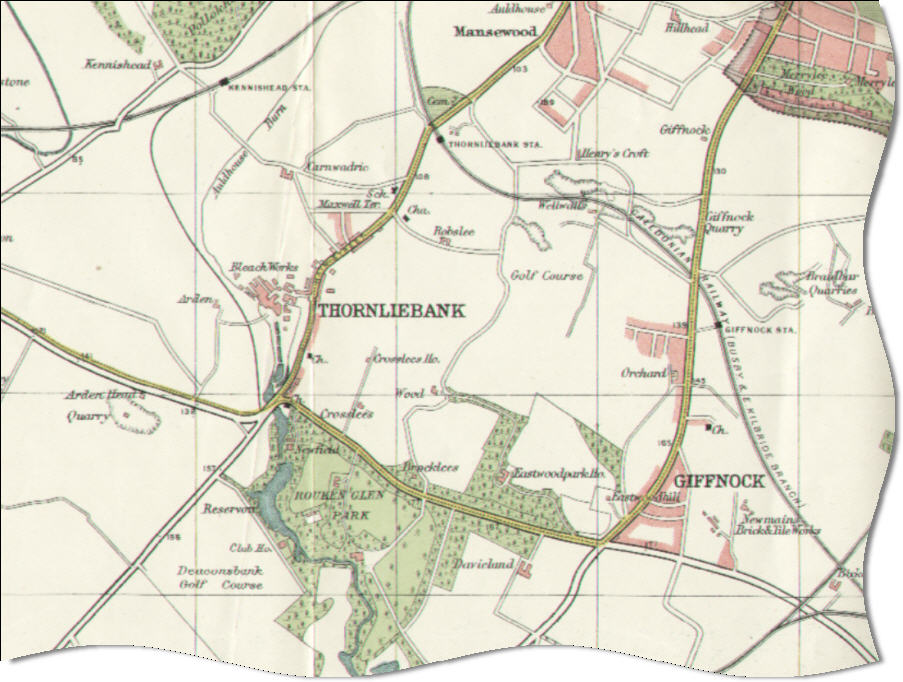
Map of Thornliebank in the early 1900s

Walter Crum who was in charge by 1819 was a chemist and Fellow of the Royal Society. He replaced spinning and weaving by calico printing with bleaching, turkey red dyeing and "beetling". This brought immigrants from Northern Ireland and the New Statistical Account of Scotland described Thornliebank as "a very flourishing village where, thirty years ago, three families did not exist".

Walter's son Alexander Crum who took over the printing works was a major philanthropist supporting housing, education, and leisure facilities in the village. He also provided funds for the village club and Thornliebank Parish Church. Alexander Crum was Member of Parliament (MP) for Renfrewshire from 1880 to 1885. After his death he was commemorated by the Crum Library which was designed by the Scottish architect Sir Rowand Anderson and formally opened on 20 March 1897.

== Woodfarm ==
Woodfarm is a residential area of Thornliebank, next to Rouken Glen Park and Eastwood Park. The housing is a mix of (mostly formerly) council-owned property, ex Army-owned houses, older bungalows and villas, and newer flats and family homes built within the last twenty years.

Woodfarm Playing Fields sports complex was completed in 2004. The development features a full-sized football pitch, three five-a-side football pitches (that can also be used as tennis courts), and a clubhouse with changing rooms. Woodfarm High School, opposite the complex, has use of the pitches on weekdays for physical education classes, while the public has access to the leisure facilities on evenings and weekends. There is also a separate Woodfarm Pavilion, a community hall with grass playing fields primarily used for cricket.

== Demography ==
According to the 2011 census, the Thornliebank census locality had a total resident population of 4,051.

== Transport ==
Public transport in the area is coordinated by Strathclyde Partnership for Transport. Thornliebank railway station is on the East Kilbride branch of the Glasgow South Western Line. Originally opened by the Busby Railway in 1881, it is served by half-hourly trains running between Glasgow Central and East Kilbride. Bus services are mainly provided by First Glasgow: services 10, 57 and 57A pass the railway station, while 38, 38A, 38B & 38C serve the Woodfarm area, all linking Thornliebank with Glasgow city centre.

The B769 (Spiersbridge Road) runs through the middle of Thornliebank, with the A727 running to the south of it, which leads to junction 3 of the M77 motorway at the western edge of the Thornliebank area.

== Schools ==
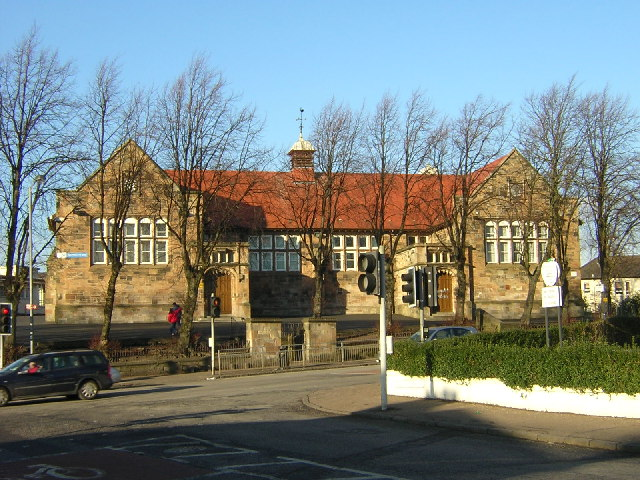
Thornliebank Primary School

Thornliebank Primary School is the local non-denominational primary school.

Thornliebank has one non-denominational secondary Woodfarm High School in the Woodfarm area. Thornliebank Primary acts as a feeder school for Woodfarm.

Our Lady of the Missions in Woodfarm is the Roman Catholic primary school for Thornliebank. It is a feeder school for St Ninian's High School, Giffnock.

== Churches ==
Thornliebank Parish Church - Church of Scotland. The Minister is Rev. Mike Gargrave.

St. Vincent de Paul - Roman Catholic Church.

== Facilities ==
Main Street: Church of Scotland, Saint Vincent de Paul Catholic church, Library, Thorntree Hall, Thornliebank Health Centre and Thornliebank Bowling Club.

== Sport ==
Thornliebank F.C. were a senior football club in existence between 1875 and 1907. They were the first winners of the Renfrewshire Cup in 1879. They reached the 1880 Scottish Cup Final, losing 3–0 to Queen's Park.

== Notable people ==
- Sir Robert Carswell (1793–1857) – famous pathologist
- John Clark, Steven Clark and Amanda MacKinnon - members of indie pop band Bis who attended Woodfarm High School
- Alexander Crum – Member of Parliament and local businessman
- Walter Crum – chemist and local businessman
- John Finlayson – footballer (played 157 games for Luton Town)
- David Blyth Hanna – famous railway executive with Canadian Northern Railway and Canadian National Railway
- Thomas Jackson – Scottish international footballer (6 caps)
- Jim McCormick – major league baseball player
- Dougie Payne - bass guitarist of Travis
