= Rouken Glen Park =

Park in East Renfrewshire, Scotland

Rouken Glen
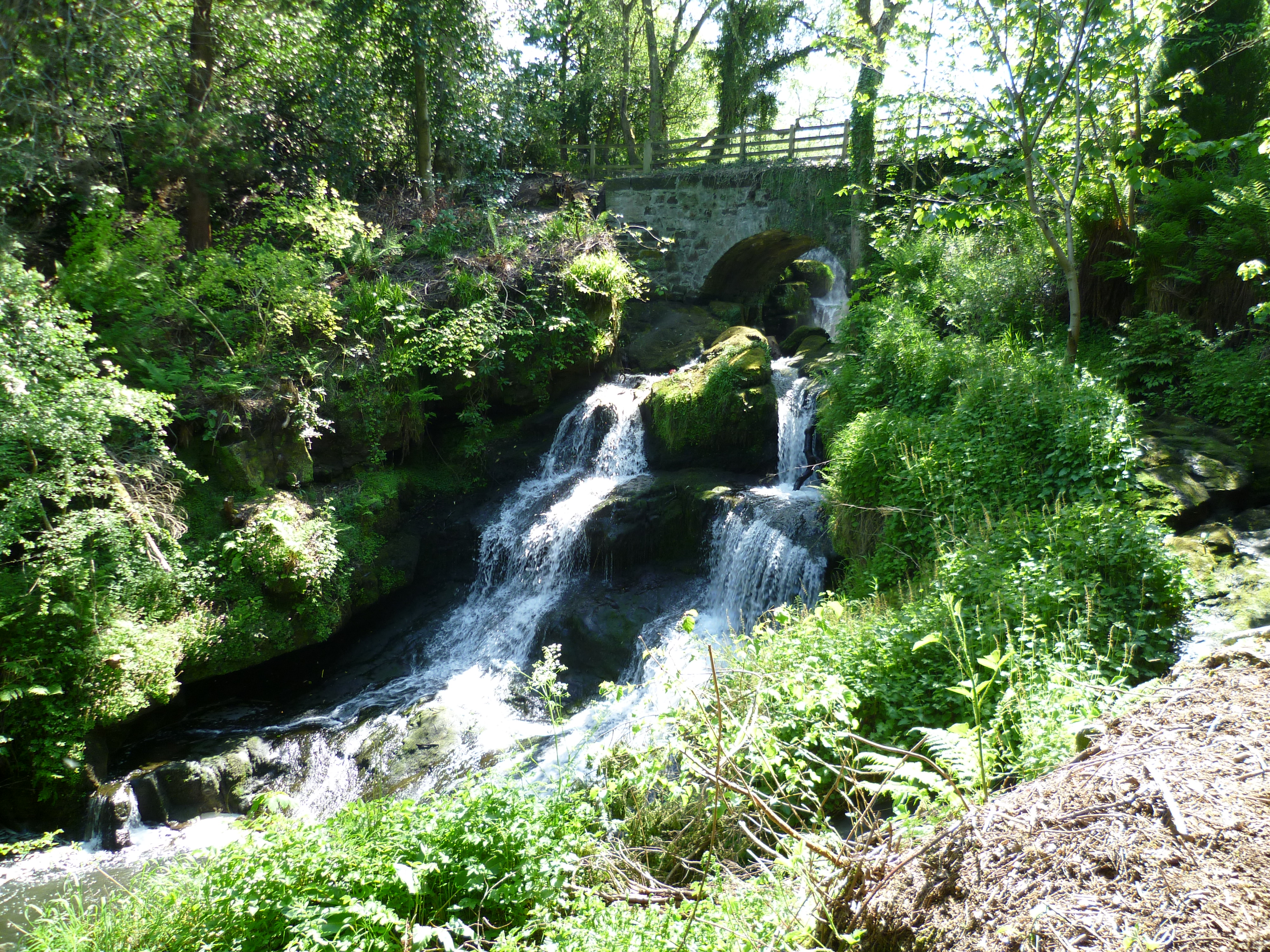
- The waterfall at Rouken Glen
- Interactive map of Rouken Glen
- Type: Public park
- Location: East Renfrewshire, Scotland
- Coordinates: 55°47′33″N 4°18′45″W
- Area: 58 hectares (143 acres)
- Created: 25 May 1906
- Operator: East Renfrewshire Council
- Status: Open all year

Inventory of Gardens and Designed Landscapes in Scotland
- Official name: Rouken Glen Park
- Designated: 31 March 2006
- Reference no.: GDL00332

Rouken Glen Park is a public park in East Renfrewshire, to the south-west of Glasgow, Scotland.

== History ==
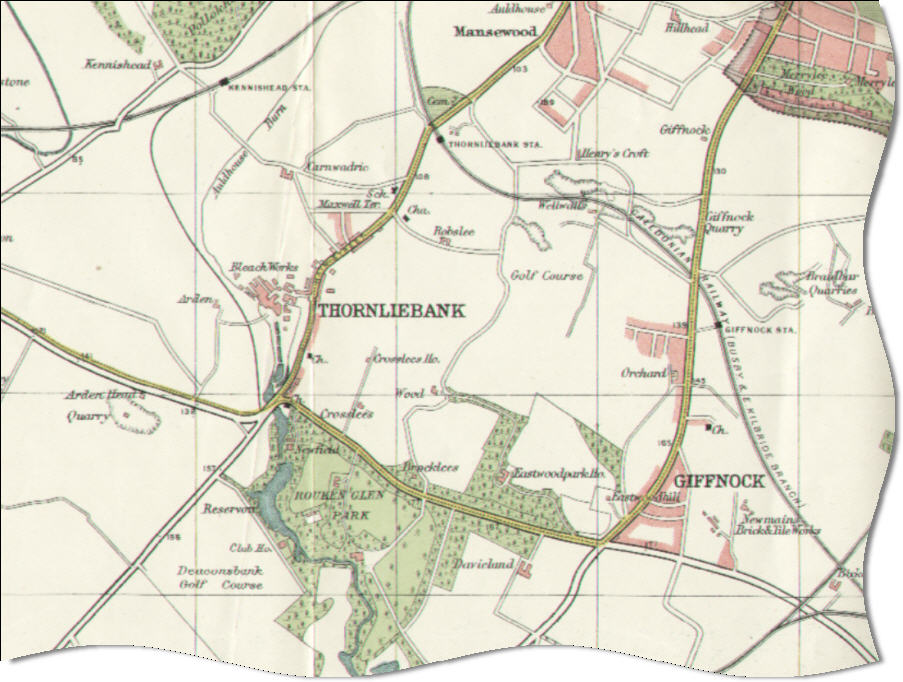
Map from 1923 showing the location of Rouken Glen and neighbourhood

The lands of Rouken Glen Park originally belonged to the Scottish Crown, and then to the Earl of Eglinton, presented to Hugh Montgomerie, 1st Earl of Eglinton on the marriage of his son in the year 1530 by James V. It takes its name from the old Rock End Meal Mill in the glen, which dates back to the early 16th century. The remains of the meal mill can be seen at the foot of the waterfall, deep within the foliage and rhododendron bushes high on the slope away from the pathway. Amongst the park's owners were Walter Crum of Thornliebank and Archibald Cameron Corbett, M.P. for Tradeston, Glasgow (later Lord Rowallan) who gifted the estate and mansion house to the citizens of Glasgow. It was officially opened on 25 May 1906 and leased in June 1984 to the then Eastwood District Council, whose area was later included by the Local Government etc. (Scotland) Act 1994 into East Renfrewshire in April 1996. Rouken Glen Park won the UK's Best Park as voted by YOU! 2016 Award at the Fields in Trust awards ceremony on 30 November 2016 – coming top in a public vote from 214 nominated parks across the UK.

== Features ==
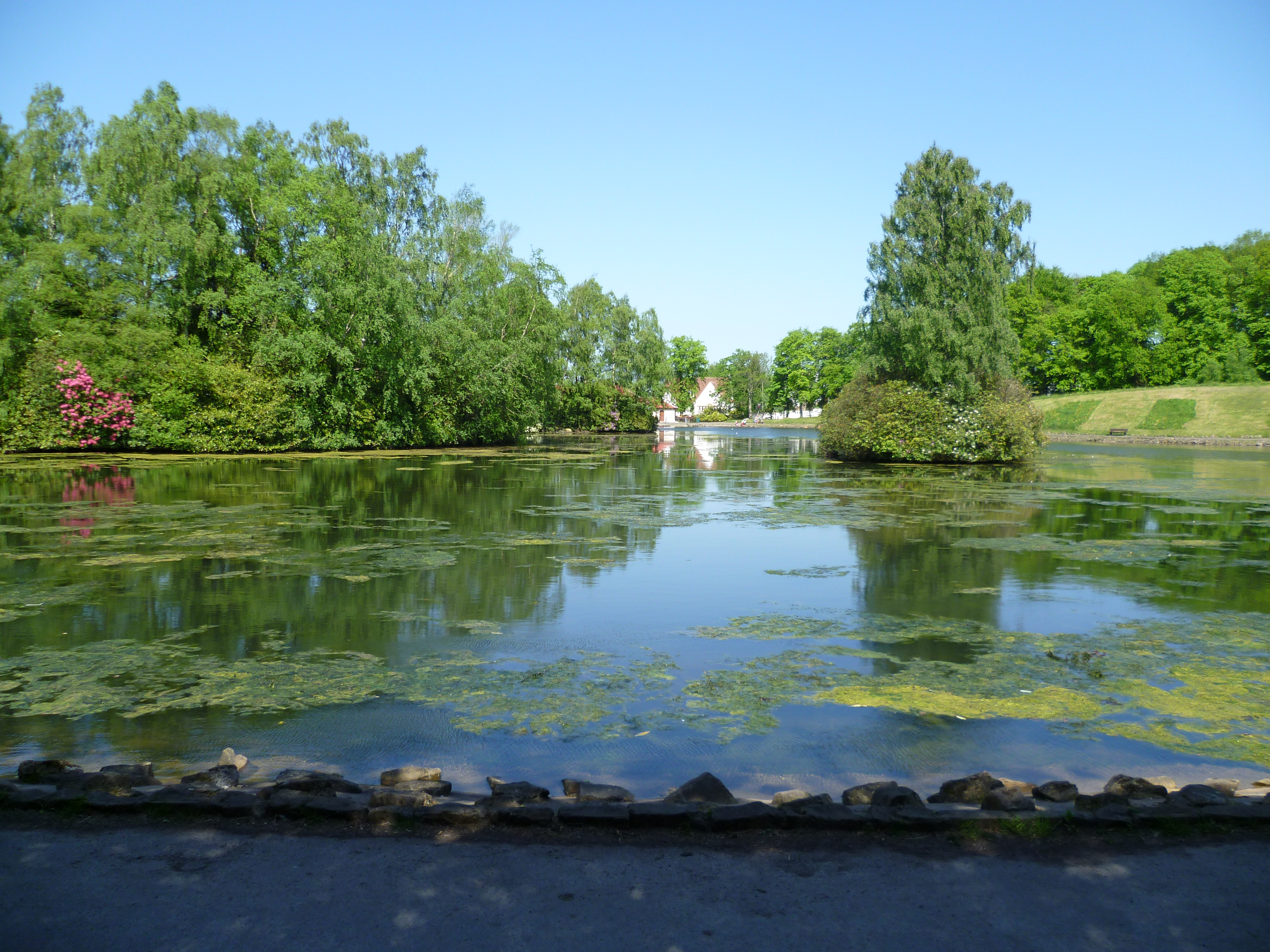
The boating pond

The glen has many of the typical features of an Edwardian urban park, such as a boating pond started in 1923 by Sir Robert McAlpine to replace a former curling pond. Rouken Glen includes a large waterfall on the Auldhouse Burn surrounded by steep woodland; the waterfall is based on a natural waterfall, doubled in height to form a reservoir to supply the printworks downstream at Thornliebank during the early 19th century. There is a walled garden in the grounds of the former manor, Thornliebank House (demolished 1965).

Directly to the south of the park is a golf course (part of a David Lloyd Leisure club based at Deaconsbank, at the southern extremity of which (close to the Neilston branch railway line) is a 16th-century circular dovecote.

== Filming location ==
The 1911 film Rob Roy, the first British-made three-reel feature film, was filmed in Rouken Glen.

An episode of Scottish comedy series Rab C. Nesbitt, when Rab gets a job sweeping leaves by the pond, was filmed there.

A scene from the film Trainspotting was also filmed in Rouken Glen, and the pondside cafeteria, 'Boaters', was featured in an episode of the BBC Scotland drama series Sea of Souls.

The titular burial scene in the film Shallow Grave was also filmed there.
