= Jenny Lind, Glasgow =

Coordinates: 55.800799°N 4.326789°W

Jenny Lind
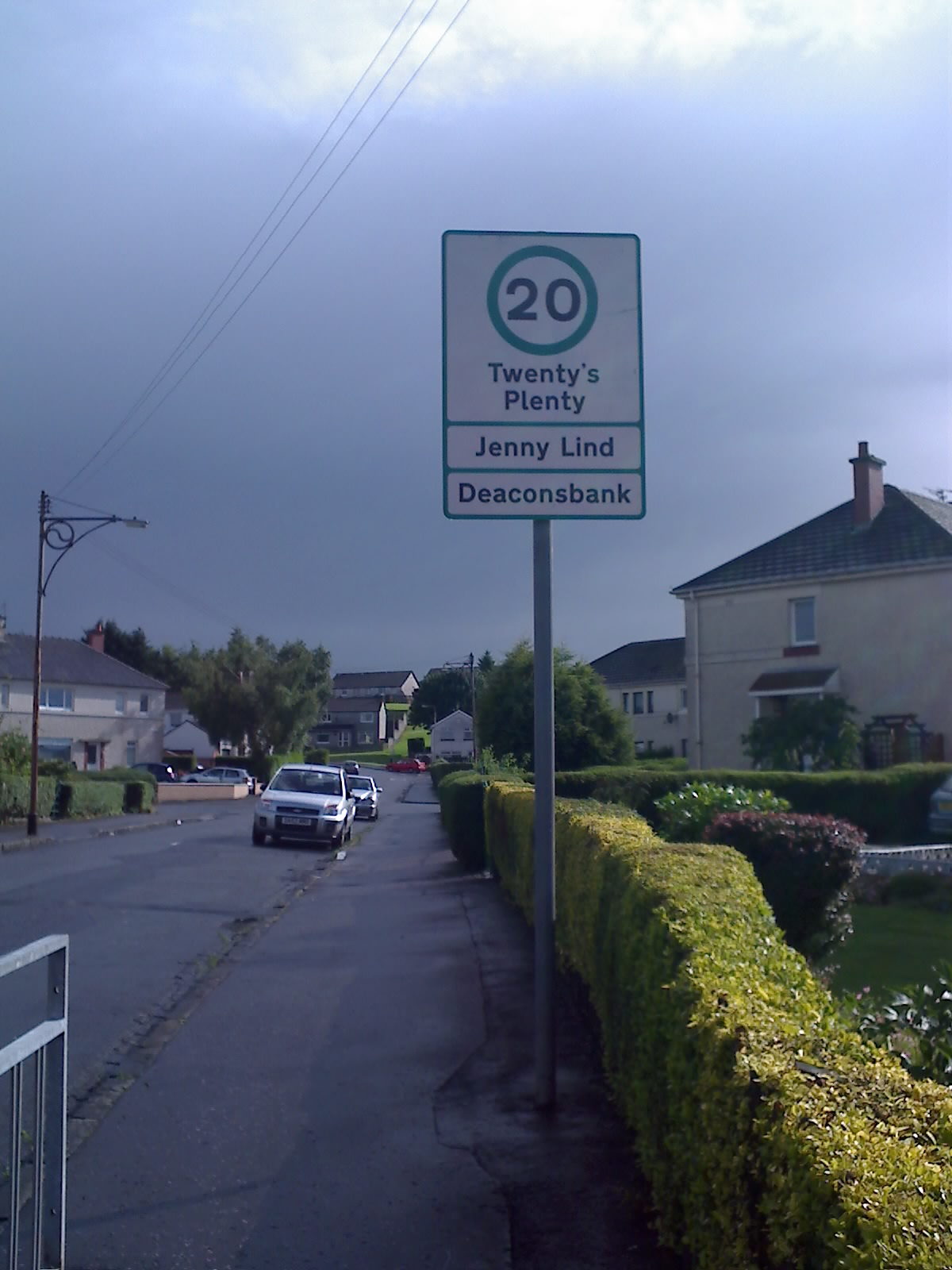
- Loganswell Road entrance to Jenny Lind from the A727 (with the Loganswell phase of Deaconsbank in the background)

- Location within Glasgow
- OS grid reference: NS543587
- Council area: Glasgow
- Lieutenancy area: Glasgow
- Country: Scotland
- Sovereign state: United Kingdom
- Post town: GLASGOW
- Postcode district: G46 8
- Dialling code: 0141
- Police: Scotland
- Fire: Scottish
- Ambulance: Scottish
- UK Parliament: Glasgow South West
- Scottish Parliament: Glasgow Pollok

Jenny Lind is a small neighbourhood in the Scottish city of Glasgow. It is situated south of the River Clyde, contiguous with the larger Deaconsbank neighbourhood and across a dual carriageway (A727 Nitshill Road) from the Arden and Thornliebank Industrial Estate. It was extended slightly in the 21st century by the addition of Jenny Lind Court. Jenny Lind falls under the Glasgow City Council Greater Pollok ward and has a short border with Deaconsbank Golf Club and Rouken Glen Park in the East Renfrewshire council region.

== Historical ==
The area, with the housing mainly constructed in the late 1930s by The Corporation of the City of Glasgow, is named after the famous Swedish opera singer Jenny Lind apparently due to there having been an inn on the site at one point which had renamed itself in the singer's honour after she stayed there.

Before housing was constructed in the area, the land was used primarily for farming and was part of the Maxwell family's Pollok Estate. An area of land which is located between present day Deaconsbank and Jenny Lind is featured in a painting titled "The Clogholes" (painted in 1830 by an unknown artist working for the Maxwells) which hangs in Pollok House, the ancestral home of the family. In the painting a farmstead is shown featuring grazing cattle and ruined farm buildings.

== Transport ==
- Road: A727, M77 motorway Junction 3, B769 road
- Railway: Patterton railway station to the south, or Thornliebank railway station slightly further out to the north
- First Bus Services: 10, 29, 57
