= Deaconsbank =

Neighbourhood of Glasgow

Coordinates: 55.7973°N 4.3304°W

Deaconsbank: Scottish Gaelic: A' Bruaich Seirbhiseach
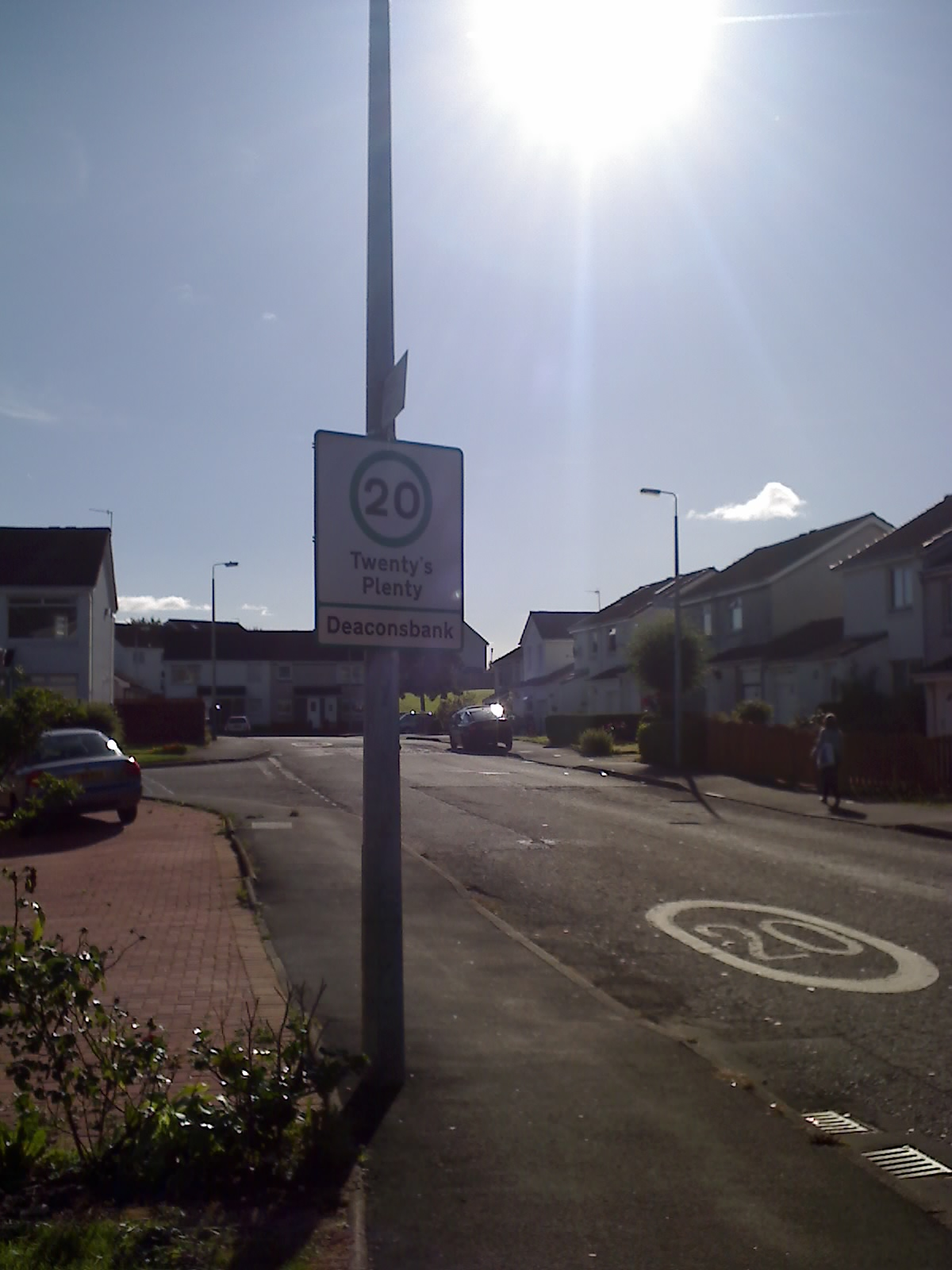
- The road entrance to the Inverewe phase of Deaconsbank from the A727

- Location within Glasgow Deaconsbank (Glasgow council area)
- OS grid reference: NS540584
- Council area: Glasgow City Council
- Lieutenancy area: Glasgow
- Country: Scotland
- Sovereign state: United Kingdom
- Post town: GLASGOW
- Postcode district: G46
- Dialling code: 0141
- Police: Scotland
- Fire: Scottish
- Ambulance: Scottish
- UK Parliament: Glasgow South West
- Scottish Parliament: Glasgow Pollok

Deaconsbank is a neighbourhood in the Scottish city of Glasgow. It is situated south of the River Clyde. The main feature of the area, which falls into the Greater Pollok ward of Glasgow City Council and directly borders the East Renfrewshire council region, is an estate of around 639 private houses built in the late 1970s by Barratt Developments, prior to which the area was open farmland. Deaconsbank is bordered by the M77 motorway to the west and by Rouken Glen Park and golf course to the east. The northern parts of the suburban town of Newton Mearns are a short distance to the south, as is Patterton railway station.

== Residential areas ==
Deaconsbank is divided into three housing stages that were constructed one after the other. There is no direct road connectivity between these phases; only walkways are available. The streets in each phase all share the phase's name as the first part of the name. The first phase to be built was Inverewe off Nitshill Road A727 (named after a location near Loch Ewe (north of Torridon), it is the smallest of the three phases). Phase two was Loganswell, again off Nitshill Road, built adjoining from the Jenny Lind area constructed decades earlier (Loganswell may have been named after a small hamlet in nearby East Renfrewshire). The last and largest phase built was Invergarry (named after a location in Glen Garry near Loch Oich), this time off Stewarton Road B769

Deaconsbank has for many years had an active residents association, as required by the Title Deeds. The primary purpose of the association is to maintain the "common or amenity ground", which totals about 27 acres in both large and small pieces of largely grassland.

=== New adjoining housing developments ===
In recent years more housing (Thistlebank and Mearns Grove) has been built to the south of Invergarry heading towards Newton Mearns; in a nod to the existing housing estate it adjoined, the streets in Thistlebank are named after Deaconsbank.

== History ==
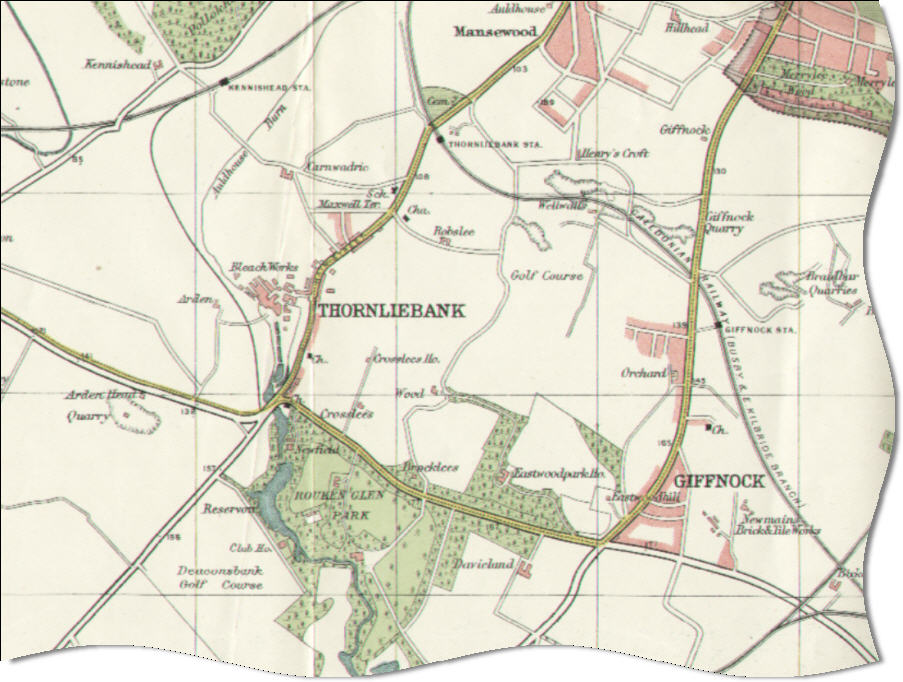
Map showing the Deaconsbank area (bottom left) adjacent to the golf course of the same name in early 1900s

The name Deaconsbank is taken from the former nearby Deacons Bank Farm beside the Auldhouse Burn which flows through what is now the modern day Rouken Glen park. Before housing was constructed in the area that was to bear the name of the farm, the land there was also primarily used for agriculture and both areas were part of the Maxwell family's Pollok Estate. The area was described in the sale documents as "Darnley Park" and an area of land which is located between present day Deaconsbank and Jenny Lind, titled 'The Clogholes' both hang in Pollok House, the ancestral home of the Maxwell family. Both works are watercolours painted in 1830 by an unknown artist working for the Maxwell family and are part of a larger series depicting parts of their vast estate.

During World War II, the land beside Deaconsbank and Patterton was used as a prisoner-of-war camp. Specifically, the area of housing called Thistlebank, immediately to the south of Invergarry Drive, and with its main street called Deaconsbank Avenue, shows on maps as having been exactly the site of what may have been an army camp which was then used as a prisoner of war (PoW) camp. In recent years before the construction of more housing, archaeological evaluation and recording work in connection with the prisoner of war camp took place; it appears to have been the first piece of archaeological work on a PoW camp in Scotland, and camp remains are now in the care of Glasgow City Council who have made provision for the enhancement and maintenance of the objects.

== Sports ==
Deaconsbank also is the name of the golf course to the east of Stewarton Road adjacent to Invergarry and Thistlebank adjoining Rouken Glen Park (part of a David Lloyd Leisure club), at the southern extremity of which (close to the Neilston branch railway line) is a 16th century circular dovecote.

Before relocating to Newton Mearns, Deaconsbank was also home to Whitecraigs Rugby Club with their ground adjoining Invergarry. The land has since been used for Whitecraigs Care Home and more housing.

== Transport ==
- Road: A727, M77 motorway Junction 3, B769 road.
- Railway: Patterton railway station is in Newton Mearns to the south on the B769.
- First Bus Services: 29, 38B/C/E, 57
