= House of Lords Reform Bill 2012 =

Former Bill of the Parliament of the United Kingdom

House of Lords Reform Bill
- Bill
- Parliament of the United Kingdom
- Long title: A Bill To Make provision about the membership of the House of Lords; to make provision about the disclaimer of life peerages; to abolish the jurisdiction of the House of Lords in relation to peerage claims; to make other provision relating to peerage; and for connected purposes.
- Citation: Bill 52 2012-13
- Introduced by: Nick Clegg (Commons)

Status: Withdrawn

The House of Lords Reform Bill 2012 was a proposed act of Parliament of the United Kingdom introduced to the House of Commons in June 2012 by Nick Clegg. Among other reforms, the bill would have made the House of Lords a mostly elected body. It was abandoned by the UK Government in August 2012 and formally withdrawn on 3 September 2012, following opposition from within the Conservative Party.

== Background ==
In the 2010 general election, the Conservatives and the Liberal Democrats mentioned an elected upper chamber in their manifestos. The Conservative Party manifesto stated:

We will work to build a consensus for a mainly-elected second chamber to replace the current House of Lords, recognising that an efficient and effective second chamber should play an important role in our democracy and requires both legitimacy and public confidence.

The Liberal Democrat manifesto said the party would:

Replace the House of Lords with a fully-elected second chamber with considerably fewer members than the current House.

When the two parties formed the Coalition Government, their Agreement stated:

We will establish a committee to bring forward proposals for a wholly or mainly elected upper chamber on the basis of proportional representation. The committee will come forward with a draft motion by December 2010. It is likely that this will advocate single long terms of office. It is also likely that there will be a grandfathering system for current Peers.

The Government published a draft bill for House of Lords reform on 17 May 2011.

A Joint Committee was established on 23 June 2011 to examine the draft bill. It consisted of twenty-six members: thirteen peers and thirteen MPs. It reported on 23 April 2012. Twelve members of the committee, however, also signed an Alternative Report.

The final bill was published on 27 June 2012.

== Bill summary ==
=== Membership of the House of Lords ===
Part I of the bill provided for the composition of the reformed House of Lords. The House would have to be composed of elected members, appointed members, bishops (Lords Spiritual), as well as up to eight additional "ministerial members" appointed to serve as Ministers of the Crown. The provisions would have been phased in over 10 years. Following the 2015 election, but before the next election (then anticipated to be held in 2020), the membership would have been as follows:

- 120 elected members
- 30 appointed members
- up to 21 bishops
- up to eight ministerial members
- a number of transitional members equal to two-thirds the membership of the House on 27 June 2012.

Following the hypothetical 2020 election, the number of elected and appointed members would have increased to 240 and 60, respectively; the number of bishops would have fallen to 16; and the number of transitional members would be reduced to half (relative to before the election). At the hypothetical 2025 election, the House would have comprised 360 elected members, 90 appointed members, up to 12 bishops, and up to eight additional "ministerial members" appointed to serve as Ministers of the Crown; the last of the transitional members would have left the chamber.

==== Elected members ====
Each elected member would have served for three "electoral periods", which effectively would have been the same as a single 15-year term. Elections to the reformed House would have been called for the same day as the next general election unless that election had been earlier than 7 May 2015, in which case they would coincide with the first election after 7 May 2015. Subsequent elections for one-third (120) of the elected House of Lords seats would take place at the same time as House of Commons elections, with the exception of early House of Commons elections called within two years after a House of Lords election.

The voting system was set out in Part 2 and Schedule 3 of the bill. It provided for a semi-open list system, allowing voters to choose a party or an individual, in Scotland, Wales, and England (which would have been divided into regions as was done in European Parliament elections). Northern Ireland would have used the Single transferable vote.

In the case of a casual vacancy, an interim replacement would have generally filled the seat until the next House of Lords election. In Northern Ireland, members who were in a party (at the time of their election) would have their replacement chosen by the party, while independents simply would have had their seat remain vacant. In the rest of the UK, the next person available to be selected on the party list would have become the interim replacement. If there was no one left on the list or the person did not belong to a registered party, the next person who would have been elected and still wants to join the House of Lords would have been the replacement member.

==== Appointed members ====
This bill put the House of Lords Appointments Commission on a statutory footing. Its purpose was to recommend to the Prime Minister 30 appointed members in the first two weeks of an electoral period, generally near the beginning of a new Parliament. The Prime Minister would then have been required to advise the Queen to appoint those recommended as members.

A Speakers' Committee for the House of Lords Appointments Commission would have been appointed with membership from both Houses of Parliament, with a remit similar to the Speaker's Committee on the Electoral Commission and Speaker's Committee for the Independent Parliamentary Standards Authority (the latter also becoming a Speakers' Committee and becoming a joint committee).

==== Lords Spiritual ====
Currently, there are 26 Lords Spiritual: the Archbishop of Canterbury, Archbishop of York, and the Bishops of London, Durham and Winchester plus the 21 longest-serving diocesan bishops. Under Part 4 of the bill, the first five (called "named Lords Spiritual") would still have been members. In addition, the Church of England would have had the right to select up to seven of the 37 other diocesan bishops for each electoral period. These seven are called "ordinary Lords Spiritual" in the bill.

During the first transitional period (2015–17/20), the Church would have been able to appoint 16 ordinary Lords Spiritual, but they must have been chosen from the 21 bishops who would have been Lords Spiritual as of the first House of Lords election under the old rules. The number of ordinary Lords Spiritual would have dropped to 12 for the second transitional period, with the selection limited to those who served as ordinary Lords Spiritual at the end of the first transitional period.

==== Ministerial members ====
The bill preserved the ability of Prime Ministers to appoint people to the House of Lords to serve as ministers. This ability was limited by setting a cap of eight such appointments, to be called ministerial members. The bill provided that such members would have served for the electoral period in which they were appointed and the two thereafter.

==== Transitional members ====
Part 6 of the bill provided for some members of the pre-reform House of Lords to remain during the first two electoral periods, i.e., until 2019/25. The number of transitional members was computed with reference to the number of peers entitled to a writ of summons at the beginning of 27 June 2012 (i.e. the members of the House of Lords excluding the Lords Spiritual). For the first electoral period (2015–17/20), the number of transitional members would have been equal to two-thirds of that total. The number for the second period would be one-third of the total. According to the House of Lords website, there were 790 peers with the right to a writ of summons, making the transitional membership 527 for the first period and 263 for the second.

=== Other provisions ===
The bill contained various other elements:

- In section 2, the bill explicitly provided that the Parliament Acts 1911 and 1949 would continue to apply following reform.
- The Parliamentary Standards Act 2009 would have been amended to bring the House of Lords under the authority of the Independent Parliamentary Standards Authority, and renamed the Speaker's Committee for IPSA as the Speakers' Committee for IPSA and made it a joint committee.
- The bill also provided for the expulsion and suspension of members of the House of Lords.
- Provision was made for the disclaiming of life peerages.

== Progress through Parliament ==
The bill was introduced (given its first reading) on 27 June 2012. The Opposition Labour Party supported the bill at second reading debate whilst opposing the time allocation motion (known as the "programme motion" immediately thereafter). The Labour Party stated that they would only support the bill if it consisted of: a 100% elected upper chamber, the removal of the Lords Spiritual, clarification about the relationship between the Houses of Parliament, and for the bill to be subject to a referendum. David Cameron was reported to support a referendum, but Nick Clegg rejected a referendum as unnecessary, arguing that House of Lords reform had been included in all three parties' manifestos. Labour leader Ed Miliband countered: "I am sure for some people House of Lords reform was uppermost in their mind at the time of the election, but I don't think that applies to the majority. I don't think it was the decisive issue at the general election and therefore I think it is quite hard to argue against a referendum."

On 9 July 2012 Clegg put forward the bill to a vote on the programme motion and the Second Reading. Clegg stated that the government's position was that the Parliament Act 1911 would be invoked if the Bill was rejected by the House of Lords. The legality of this, however, was a matter of debate.

Before the bill was debated, Conservative MP Jacob Rees-Mogg raised a point of order, asking the Speaker to rule on whether the bill should be classified as a hybrid bill because it affected the private interests of the Bishops of the Church of England. Had the Speaker ruled that the bill was hybrid, it would have been subject to a different, more lengthy procedure. However, the Speaker ruled that it was not. The BBC claims this was an early attempt to derail the bill's passage through Parliament.

Labour called for more scrutiny of the bill and said it would vote against the programme motion, along with several Conservative MPs. On 10 July 2012, it became clear that the Government was going to lose the vote on the programme motion and it was withdrawn. At the vote that evening on whether to give the bill a second reading, 91 Conservative MPs voted against the three line whip, while 19 more abstained. Though the bill was supported by the Labour Party in principle, the party opposed the programme motion as did the Conservative rebels. Two Conservative members of the Government resigned to vote with the rebels. The unofficial leader of the Conservative rebellion over House of Lords reform, Jesse Norman, was furiously shouted at by the Prime Minister David Cameron in the Member's Lobby in the House of Commons.

The Leader of the House of Commons, Sir George Young, told the Chamber on 10 July 2012 that a new programme motion and timetable for debating the bill had not yet been confirmed. Backbench Conservative MPs told Cameron that the House of Lords Reform Bill was "a dead duck" following the vote.

On 3 August 2012, it was reported that the Prime Minister was to announce that the bill would be dropped after negotiations with Conservative rebels broke down. Just three days later, on 6 August 2012, Deputy Prime Minister Nick Clegg announced that the Government was abandoning the bill due to the opposition from Conservative backbench MPs, claiming that the Conservatives had "broken the coalition contract". He formally announced the abandonment of the bill to the House of Commons on 3 September.

== See also ==
- Reform of the House of Lords
