= The Green Book: A Guide to Members' Allowances =

Publication of the House of Commons of the United Kingdom

- Publisher: The House of Commons
- Publication date: July 2009 (Final edition)
- Publication place: United Kingdom
- Pages: 66
- ISBN: 978-0-9562029-0-1

The Green Book: A Guide to Members' Allowances (often simply The Green Book) was a publication of the House of Commons of the United Kingdom. Prior to 7 May 2010 it set out the rules governing MPs' salaries, allowances and pensions, before being replaced by rules set by the Independent Parliamentary Standards Authority, created by the Parliamentary Standards Act 2009 as a result of the Parliamentary expenses scandal.

== Contents ==
The Green Book states that "Parliamentary allowances are designed to ensure that Members of Parliament (MPs) are reimbursed for costs properly incurred in the performance of their duties."

It describes support provided for employing staff; provision of facilities, equipment and supplies for themselves and their staff; overnight stays away from home whilst on parliamentary duties; communicating with constituents; House stationery and postage; and travel between Westminster, the constituency, and main home.

The Green Book outlines MPs' housing allowance (the "additional costs allowance"), which aims to reimburse MPs for the costs of staying away from home when on Parliamentary business. The limit in 2006-07 was £22,110. It also lists allowable and unallowable items. Receipts for all hotel bills are required, but for other items receipts are only needed for amounts over £250.

== See also ==
- United Kingdom parliamentary expenses scandal
- Salaries of members of the United Kingdom Parliament
