= Gordon McKee (politician) =

British politician

Gordon McKee MP
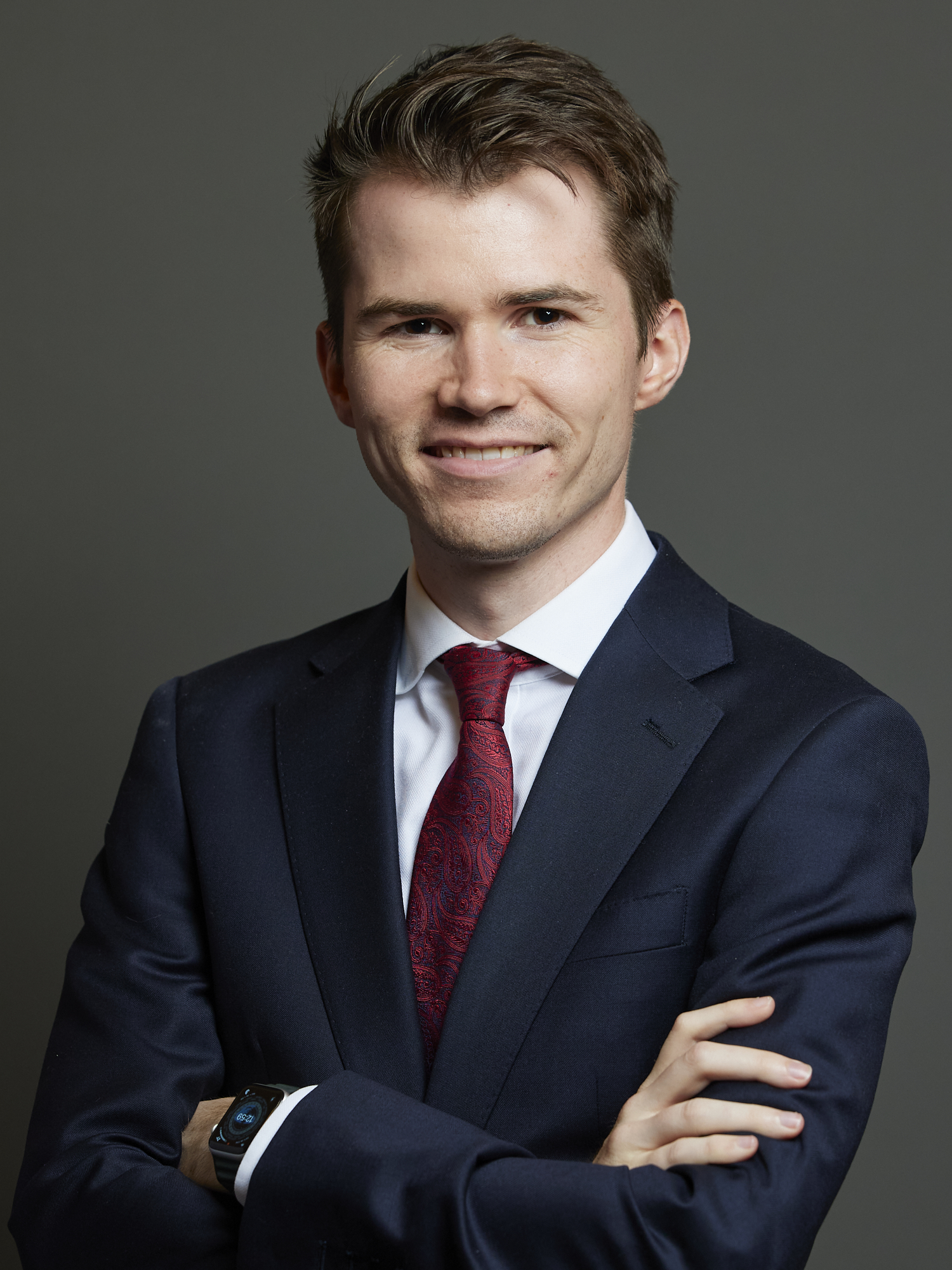
- Official portrait, 2024

Member of Parliament for Glasgow South
- Incumbent
- Assumed office 4 July 2024
- Preceded by: Stewart McDonald
- Majority: 4,154 (9.8%)

Personal details
- Born: 30 September 1994 (age 32) Rutherglen, Strathclyde, Scotland
- Party: Labour
- Education: University of Glasgow (dropped out)
- Website: gordonmckeemp.com

Gordon McKee (born 30 September 1994) is a British politician who has served as the member of Parliament (MP) for Glasgow South since 2024. A member of the Labour Party, he served as a parliamentary private secretary to the secretary of state for work and pensions from November 2024 to May 2026, under Liz Kendall and later Pat McFadden. In May 2026, he was among the Labour MPs who called for Keir Starmer's resignation as prime minister.

== Early life and career ==
Gordon McKee was born on 30 September 1994 in Rutherglen in Strathclyde, Scotland, the son of Fiona and Gordon McKee. In 2024, he described his background as "very working-class" with his father working as a welder and his grandfather as a miner. His family are said to have voted Labour, but were also "not very political". He was raised in Greater Glasgow and developed an interest in coding and technology, later studying computer science at the University of Glasgow before dropping out to focus on work as a software engineer and developer, helping to develop iPhone apps.

In 2012, McKee joined the Labour Party. He told LabourList in 2024 that he did not know a single member of a political party at this time, but felt that Labour had done "incredible things", crediting his support for Labour to the policies of the New Labour governments, which he described as having "transformed" his life as a child by providing his family with economic stability. He has named tackling child poverty as one of the reasons he joined Labour.

McKee was a unionist activist in the 2014 Scottish independence referendum. In the 2015 general election, he campaigned for Labour against the Scottish National Party (SNP). In the 2016 Scottish Parliament election, he was an organiser for Scottish Labour in Glasgow. He was also the organiser of the local Remain campaign in Glasgow's South Side for the 2016 Brexit referendum.

McKee served as the campaign director of Anas Sarwar's successful leadership bid in the 2021 Scottish Labour leadership election. He continued to serve as Sarwar's campaign director after his election as Scottish Labour leader in the 2021 Scottish Parliament election. From 2023 to 2024, McKee was a special adviser to Ian Murray, the shadow secretary of state for Scotland. Before McKee's election to the House of Commons in 2024, McKee was also a staff member of the Labour think tank Labour Together as a policy expert.

== Parliamentary career ==
=== 2024 general election campaign ===
In February 2023, McKee was selected as the Labour Party's prospective parliamentary candidate for Glasgow South in the 2024 general election, which had been held by Stewart McDonald of the SNP since 2015. McKee said he made the decision to stand for Parliament because he wanted to tackle child poverty, which he blamed on 14 years of Conservative UK governance and 17 years of devolved SNP governance. As Labour's candidate, McKee downplayed constitutional issues like devolution and independence to instead focus on the shared progressive politics of SNP and Labour voters, campaigning on improved public services, a "progressive Labour government" and a shared desire to defeat the Conservatives, in order to appeal to voters who previously backed the SNP or Scottish independence. McKee also dismissed Labour's opinion poll lead, warning that seats in Scotland would still be competitive unlike seats in England and Wales, but nonetheless remained optimistic of his chances at the election. McKee's candidacy was endorsed by Labour Digital, a pressure group chaired by Labour MP Alex Davies-Jones which supported MPs promoting policies supporting technological advancement and regulation.

On 4 July 2024, McKee was elected as the new Labour MP for Glasgow South having won 17,696 votes, or 41.8%, on a majority of 4,154, or 9.8%, over McDonald's 13,542, or 32%. Elected at the age of 29, McKee became one of the youngest MPs of the 2024 parliamentary intake, as well as the first Labour MP to represent Glasgow South since McDonald won the seat from Tom Harris in the 2015 general election. McKee was elected amid a Labour landslide across Scotland at the expense of the SNP, which saw all six constituencies in Glasgow won by Labour candidates from the SNP. Following his victory, McKee said Scottish Labour MPs would be "at the very heart" of the new Labour government of Keir Starmer. Stephen Daisley of The Spectator named McKee as one of several newly elected senior Scottish Labour MPs and labelled him a "rising star".

=== Constituency work ===
Since his election, McKee has been involved in the long-running campaign to bring a supermarket to Castlemilk, an area of his constituency described by campaigners as a "food desert", which he raised in his maiden speech. On 5 November 2025, he sponsored and led a Westminster Hall debate on inequality of access to fresh and nutritious food, telling MPs that residents were "left to choose between food and heating" while travelling around three miles to the nearest major supermarket. He also tabled an early day motion recognising the work of the Castlemilk Lived Experience Board, a campaign group established by four local housing associations, which was formally presented to the group in January 2026.

In February 2026, Castlemilk was awarded up to £20 million over ten years through the UK government's Pride in Place programme for regenerating disadvantaged neighbourhoods, which McKee had campaigned for and welcomed in the House of Commons. In April 2026, he organised a public meeting attended by more than 50 residents to discuss how the funding should be spent, and told the BBC he had held discussions with supermarket chains about opening a store in the area, including what he described as "pretty advanced talks" regarding the Braes Shopping Centre, though the site would require reconfiguration and as of 2026 no supermarket had opened in Castlemilk. McKee later described the Castlemilk funding as his proudest achievement since entering Parliament.

=== Westminster ===
McKee made his maiden speech to Parliament on 25 July 2024 during a House of Commons debate on the newly established Code of Conduct and Modernisation Committee. Shortly after his election, he became vice-chair of the All-Party Parliamentary Group on Tennis. During the 2024 Labour Party freebies controversy, he caused controversy when it emerged that he was gifted tickets worth £550 to the men's final of the Wimbledon Championships a little more than a week after being elected. McKee said he had been offered the tickets by the Lawn Tennis Association and accepted them because it had investments in his constituency and he wanted these to continue.

Following his election to Parliament in July 2024, McKee became a founding member of the Labour Growth Group, a new caucus of backbench Labour MPs described as leaning towards the right wing of the Labour Party and serving to support the leadership of Keir Starmer. After joining the group, which mainly campaigns on house building and economic growth and promotes Labour's manifesto pledge to build 1.5 million new homes over the 2024–2029 parliamentary term, McKee said he and his colleagues would "always support the builders, not the blockers" and described sustainable economic growth as the way to improve living standards across the UK, adding that this could only be achieved by "saying yes to major reform, construction and investment in housing and services".

Following the 2024 State Opening of Parliament, McKee followed the Labour Party whip in voting against an amendment to the King's Speech by the SNP, which would have committed the new Labour government to abolishing the two-child benefit cap in England and Wales, despite the SNP's own support for the cap in Scotland where some welfare policy is devolved. The government said it could not afford to abolish the cap, which would cost an estimated £2.5 billion, with the UK facing a £22 billion deficit which it blamed on the previous Conservative government. Following the vote, McKee said he wished the government could abolish the cap and promised that Labour would do so as soon as possible, but said it was unable to immediately because of the economic inheritance left by the Conservatives. He encouraged his constituents to contact their MSPs to campaign for its abolition in Scotland by the devolved Scottish Government. McKee also voted in favour of the government's policy of means testing the Winter Fuel Payment for pensioners in England and Wales in September 2024, pointing to the £400 rise in the State Pension and the £22 billion deficit.

In October 2024, McKee joined the International Development Committee. He told The Scotsman that he had joined because many of his constituents worked at the Foreign, Commonwealth and Development Office in Glasgow and he felt it was important for Scottish representation on the committee, and also wanted to help secure aid into the Gaza Strip ahead of a rumoured blockade of northern Gaza by Israel during its invasion of Gaza, which he called "appalling". In November 2024, Prime Minister Keir Starmer appointed McKee to the United Kingdom's delegation on the NATO Parliamentary Assembly. McKee was also appointed as a parliamentary private secretary (PPS) to the secretary of state for work and pensions, Liz Kendall, and became a member of the Speaker's Committee for the Independent Parliamentary Standards Authority. He continued to serve as a PPS under Kendall's successor Pat McFadden.

Since 2025, McKee has attracted attention for his social media activity, particularly on the short-form platform TikTok where he has posted several short videos which have gone viral, including one prior to the 2025 Budget in which he used stacks of biscuits to explain the debt-to-GDP ratio. According to Politico, McKee is one of several "very-online" influencer Labour MPs from the 2024 parliamentary intake who have caused controversy in the upper ranks of the Labour Party for their heavy use of social media, which has led to concerns around the enforcement of message discipline.

In May 2026, following Labour's poor performance in that year's local elections and the 2026 Scottish Parliament election, McKee was among the earliest Scottish Labour MPs who publicly called on Keir Starmer to resign as Prime Minister. In a statement, he said Starmer no longer had "the trust or confidence of the public, or large swathes of the Parliamentary Labour Party", warning that without change "the outcome could be Nigel Farage in Downing Street". As a result, he left his role as parliamentary private secretary.

== Political views ==
Politically, McKee has been described as a Starmerite. He has particularly named former Labour leader and prime minister Gordon Brown as "someone I admire hugely" and is also reported to have favourable views of his predecessor Tony Blair. He is a founding member of the Labour Growth Group, a faction of the Labour Party which mainly campaigns on house building and economic growth and has been described as leaning towards the right of the party, and is endorsed by the right-wing Labour to Win group. He supported the United Kingdom to remain in the European Union during the 2016 Brexit referendum. Since his election to Parliament, he has been a member of the Labour Movement for Europe.

On foreign policy, McKee has expressed his support for Palestine in the Gaza war. In July 2024, he called for an immediate ceasefire with immediate aid into Gaza, a two-state solution with Palestinian statehood, the release of hostages and an end to the violence. He also met Husam Zomlot, the Palestinian ambassador to the United Kingdom, to reiterate this stance. He reiterated these calls later in November 2024, after he took a testimony from Nizam Mamode who recounted his experience treating patients at Nasser Hospital in Gaza, where children were allegedly targeted deliberately by Israeli drone strikes. Following Israel's invasion of Lebanon in October 2024, McKee called for an immediate ceasefire. McKee has also supported Ukraine against the Russian invasion of 2022, and in September 2024 joined other MPs on an international visit to Kyiv, where he met Ukrainian president Volodymyr Zelenskyy and other survivors of the invasion and was caught in a Russian air raid, which he survived unharmed.
