= Stewart McDonald (politician) =

Scottish politician (born 1986)

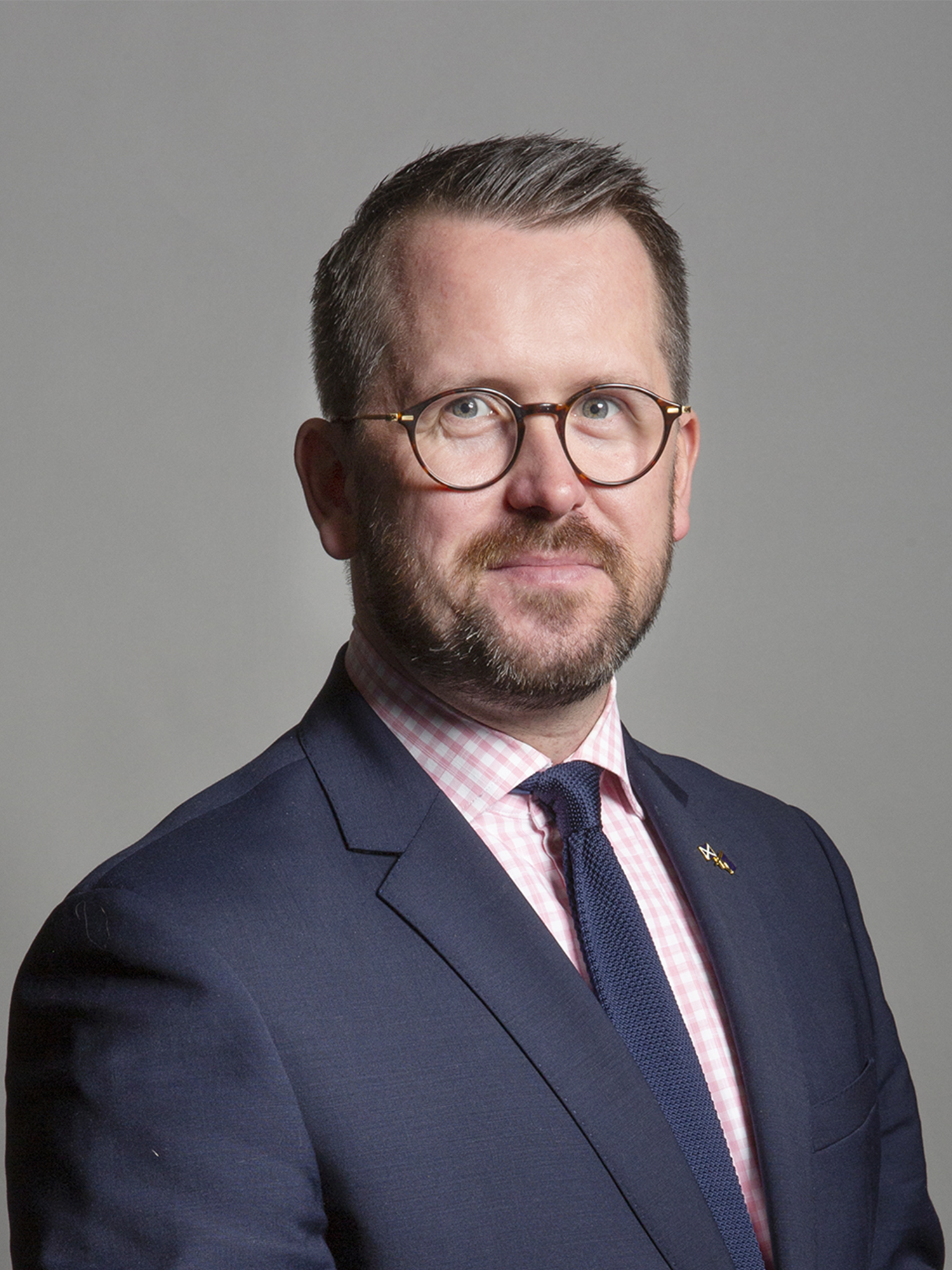
- Official portrait, 2019

SNP Spokesperson for Defence in the House of Commons
- In office 20 June 2017 – 8 December 2022
- Leader: Ian Blackford
- Preceded by: Brendan O'Hara
- Succeeded by: Dave Doogan

Member of Parliament for Glasgow South
- In office 7 May 2015 – 30 May 2024
- Preceded by: Tom Harris
- Succeeded by: Gordon McKee

Personal details
- Born: Stewart Malcolm McDonald; 24 August 1986 (age 39) Glasgow, Scotland
- Party: Scottish National Party

Stewart Malcolm McDonald (born 24 August 1986) is a Scottish National Party (SNP) politician. He was the Member of Parliament (MP) for the Glasgow South constituency from May 2015 to May 2024. He was the SNP Spokesperson for Defence from 2017 to 2022, resigning after the election of Stephen Flynn as Leader.

== Early life and career ==
Stewart McDonald was born on 25 August 1986 in Glasgow. His family moved to Govan when he was five years old, as his father was a janitor at a local primary school. He left Govan High School aged eighteen, and worked in a variety of jobs including as a retail manager and a holiday rep in Tenerife before becoming a parliamentary case worker for Anne McLaughlin. After the 2011 Scottish Parliament Election, he became a case worker for James Dornan.

== Parliamentary career ==
At the 2015 general election, McDonald was elected to Parliament as MP for Glasgow South with 54.9% of the vote and a majority of 12,269.

In December 2015, McDonald came second place in the Beard Liberation Front's Parliamentary Beard of the Year Award. He was reported to have come very close to winning first place, but was narrowly defeated by Labour leader Jeremy Corbyn after Diane Abbott urged people on Twitter to vote for Corbyn in the contest.

McDonald was re-elected as MP for Glasgow South at the snap 2017 general election with a decreased vote share of 41.1% and a decreased majority of 2,027.

In July 2017 McDonald introduced a Private Members' Bill to ban unpaid trial shifts for workers. He called the practice "exploitation" for young job-seekers, with his Bill gaining the support of the Scottish Trades Union Congress and the National Union of Students among others. In March 2018 the Bill was talked out of the Commons, meaning it could not be voted on. A year on from when he first introduced the Bill, he vowed to "keep fighting" to end unpaid trial work.

On 11 April 2018, as the SNP's Defence Spokesperson, McDonald warned Prime Minister Theresa May over launching airstrikes on Syria in response to the Douma chemical attack without first having the airstrikes approved by a parliamentary vote. He said the SNP would support such airstrikes if they were part of a wider plan to bring an end to the war. The UK launched airstrikes on 14 April without a parliamentary vote, which McDonald condemned as "gesture bombing".

In August 2018, McDonald gave his support for pre-exposure prophylaxis (PrEP) for HIV prevention to be available on the NHS. He said that those opposing PrEP's introduction to the NHS were being homophobic, and accused the UK government of "putting more hurdles in the way of the rollout of PrEP".

McDonald has been a long-time supporter of transgender rights, and reforming the Gender Recognition Act (GRA) in Scotland to make it easier for people to self-identify. He said in November 2019 that "I've always stood up for trans rights and I always will – there's no chance I'll desert a community that's integral to our wider movement for equality". He had declared his support for Nicola Sturgeon in April 2019 when some SNP groups objected to her support of reforming the GRA.

At the 2019 general election, McDonald was again re-elected, with an increased vote share of 48.1% and an increased majority of 9,005 votes.

McDonald is a member of the Inter-Parliamentary Alliance on China. In September 2021, McDonald said he was troubled by Scotland's relationship with China, which he claimed "opened the doorway to misinformation from Beijing". He also claimed Russia has a history of disinformation running in Scotland and reported the show run by Alex Salmond (The Alex Salmond Show) on RT "lends credibility and legitimacy to Kremlin propaganda".

McDonald is a republican and in January 2023 called for a debate over the existence of the British monarchy in an independent Scotland.

In June 2024, McDonald was reselected as the SNP candidate for Glasgow South at the 2024 general election, but was defeated by the Labour candidate, Gordon McKee.

== Post-parliamentary career ==
Following his defeat at the 2024 UK General Election, McDonald became the founding director of public affairs consultancy Regent Park Strategies Ltd. He also works as a columnist for The Spectator and The Scotsman.

== Personal life ==
McDonald is gay, and on 19 May 2015 gathered with other LGBT SNP MPs to campaign for a "Yes" vote in the Irish referendum on same-sex marriage, being held three days later. He is also an honorary associate of the National Secular Society.

== Honours and awards ==
- 2019: Third Class of the Order of Merit of Ukraine

Parliament of the United Kingdom
Preceded by Tom Harris	Member of Parliament for Glasgow South; 2015–2024	Succeeded by Gordon McKee
