= 2013 periodic review of Westminster constituencies =

Failed review of UK electoral boundaries

The 2013 periodic review of Westminster constituencies, also known as the sixth review, was an ultimately unfruitful cycle of the process by which constituencies of the House of Commons of the United Kingdom are reviewed and redistributed. The four UK boundary commissions carried out their reviews between 2011 and 2013, but their recommendations were not taken up by the government and instead the 2018 periodic review of Westminster constituencies was carried out from 2016 to 2018. That review was also not implemented and its results were formally laid aside in 2020.

The boundary commissions were to take into account revised rules for the number and size (electoral quota) of constituencies. The proposed changes included having a total of 600 seats rather than 650, as agreed by Parliament in 2011 to meet a reformist aim of the 2010–2015 coalition agreement.

The process began in 2011 and was intended to be completed by 2013, but a January 2013 vote in the House of Commons stopped the process. The commissions commenced their map-drawing of entirely new boundaries in 2016, before they completed their work in September 2018.

== Background ==
The process was launched on 4 March 2011 by the Boundary Commission for England, Boundary Commission for Scotland, Boundary Commission for Northern Ireland and Boundary Commission for Wales. The changes were to be implemented by virtue of the Parliamentary Voting System and Constituencies Act 2011, which amended the Parliamentary Constituencies Act 1986. Part II of the Act (henceforth referred to as 'PVSaCA') deals with the amendments to the manner in which House of Commons constituencies are formed by the individual boundary commissions. Each commission was obliged to make a final report to the Secretary of State before 1 October 2013 (by virtue of Section 10, Clause 3, which amends Subsection 2 of Section 3 of the 1986 Act).

Following a debate in the House of Lords on 14 January 2013, the Opposition tabled and voted for an amendment to legislation to postpone the date by which the Review ends, which they passed and sent back to the Commons, on a relatively small 69-vote majority. A Commons vote on 29 January 2013 in agreement meant the review instead began after May 2015 for completion in 2018. The Review had been required for completion by October 2013 under the principles of Section 3 of the Parliamentary Constituencies Act 1986 (themselves loosening previous requirements by instead calling for periodic reviews every eight to twelve years) as left intact by Part 2 of the Parliamentary Voting System and Constituencies Act 2011. The Electoral Registration and Administration Act 2013 superseded these principles to make an exception for this Review, delaying it until 2018.

=== Changes to review process ===
The original legislation made several significant changes to the way constituencies were to be reviewed.

Number of constituencies: PVSaCA required there to be exactly six hundred parliamentary constituencies (Schedule 2, clause 1) – a reduction of 50 from the total fought at the 2010 general election. This is the first time a precise number has been included in legislation.

More equal constituencies: with a few specified exceptions for island areas (see below), the size (electorate) of all constituencies must have been within 5% above or below the target number.

Increased frequency of reviews: the first review was to be completed by 2013 so that a general election held in 2015 would have been contested on the new boundaries. The legislation required a review every five years after that date, rather than every twelve to fifteen years as previously. To ensure this timetable was achievable, the reviews would take place over the whole country simultaneously, rather than being phased over several years as in the past.

=== Protected constituencies ===
Four island constituencies are 'protected' by PVSaCA. They are:

- Orkney and Shetland
- Na h-Eileanan an Iar (the Western Isles of Scotland)
- Two seats within the boundaries of the Isle of Wight (this is an enforced division of the single Isle of Wight constituency contested at previous elections)

== Timetable ==
The four commissions adopted consistent procedures for developing their boundary proposals, starting with simultaneous announcements in March 2011 which began the review process.

In each part of the UK, the relevant commission first published "Provisional Proposals", accessible on the Web and viewable at local council offices. There was a twelve-week period from the moment of publication during which the public could comment on the proposals, whether supporting, opposing or suggesting an alternative. During this period, public hearings held across the country allowed those representations to be made in public: all written comments received were made public after the end of the twelve-week period.

The commissions then considered all representations, and the resulting Revised Recommendations were to be published for further public consultation (8 weeks), though without a second public hearing. The commissions would then decide on their final proposals.

The Scottish commission gave the following expected timetable for the process which was temporarily halted; the timings in the three other countries were expected to be similar. The English commission began its public consultations on 11 October 2011 in Manchester, and concluded on 17/18 November in Darlington, and Exeter.

- Start of review: March 2011
- Initial Proposals consultation (12 weeks): September/October 2011 – January 2012
- Public Hearings: October/ November 2011
- Scrutiny of representations: Spring 2012
- Revised Proposals consultation (8 weeks): November 2012 – January 2013
- Report submission: Summer 2013

The four commissions would have been required to present their reports by October 2013. The government had hoped that the reports would then be approved by Parliament and in place for the May 2015 general election. In January 2013, the Government lost a vote on this timetable, which effectively ended the entire process.

== Distribution of seats ==
The total of 600 constituencies required by the Act were allocated between the four countries of the UK as shown in the table below. The English Boundary Commission then announced that the number of constituencies allocated to England would be sub-divided by region, with the aim of producing "initial proposals in which each constituency is wholly contained within a single region". The seats allocated to each region are also shown below.

=== United Kingdom ===
Nation	2010/15/17/19 seats	2013 review				2018 review			
Nation	2010/15/17/19 seats	Electorate	Allocation	Change	Average size	Electorate	Allocation	Change	Average size
England *	532	38,332,557	500	−32	76,665	37,294,494	499	−33	74,738
(Isle of Wight)	1	110,924	2	+1	55,462	105,448	2	+1	52,724
Northern Ireland	18	1,190,635	16	−2	74,415	1,243,369	17	−1	73,139
Scotland *	57	3,873,387	50	−7	77,468	3,842,736	51	−6	75,348
(Orkney and Shetland)	1	33,755	1	—	33,755	33,229	1	—	33,229
(Na h-Eileanan an Iar)	1	21,837	1	—	21,837	20,887	1	—	20,887
Wales	40	2,281,596	30	−10	76,053	2,181,841	29	−11	75,236
Total	650	45,844,691	600	−50	76,408	44,562,440	600	−50	74,270

* Excluding the protected island areas

=== Regions of England ===
Region	2010/15/17/19 seats	2013 review				2018 review			
Region	2010/15/17/19 seats	Electorate	Allocation	Change	Average size	Electorate	Allocation	Change	Average size
Eastern	58	4,280,707	56	−2	76,441	4,242,266	57	−1	74,426
East Midlands	46	3,361,089	44	−2	76,388	3,275,046	44	−2	74,433
London	73	5,266,904	68	−5	77,454	5,118,884	68	−5	75,278
North East	29	1,971,249	26	−3	75,817	1,874,396	25	−4	74,976
North West	75	5,253,019	68	−7	77,250	5,074,302	68	−7	74,622
South East *	83	6,192,504	81	−2	76,450	6,067,475	81	−2	74,907
South West	55	4,042,475	53	−2	76,273	3,930,770	53	−2	74,165
West Midlands	59	4,115,668	54	−5	76,216	3,989,320	53	−6	75,270
Yorkshire and the Humber	54	3,848,942	50	−4	76,979	3,722,035	50	−4	74,441
Total	532*	38,332,557	500	−32	76,665	37,294,494	499	–33	74,738

* Excluding the protected Isle of Wight

== Practical considerations ==
The four commissions published descriptions of how they would carry out their work, and held meetings with representatives of political parties to explain their approach in the light of the more restrictive rules to which they have to work.

For example, the Boundary Commission for England stated in its 2011 newsletter: "The Commission wishes to make very clear that those with an interest in the review process should understand that the defined number of constituencies and the 5% electoral parity target are statutory requirements that it must apply and that it has absolutely no discretion in respect of either matter."

=== Size of constituencies ===
In Great Britain, in this review constituencies could have no less an electorate than 72,810 and no more than 80,473. The quota in Northern Ireland is slightly different, with a fixed minimum of 70,583 and a fixed maximum of 80,473.

The quota does not apply if the area of a constituency is larger than 12,000 square kilometres (4,630 sq mi) (new Schedule 2, Rule 4(2)). No constituency can be larger than 13,000 square kilometres (5,020 sq mi) (new Schedule 2, Rule 4(1)).

=== Composition of constituencies ===
Westminster constituencies are usually created by combining entire electoral wards. For the 2013 Review, the Boundary Commission for England said in its newsletter that whilst it had used entire electoral wards in the past, the new legislation and fixed electorate quota made that harder. Therefore, it aimed to use polling districts in circumstances where using entire wards was not possible, and said "it is prepared to take into account as appropriate any new ward boundaries that have been introduced after 6 May 2010". The English Commission outlined that it was "focused on getting all constituencies within the statutory range, rather than as close as possible to the electoral quota figure itself".

== Provisional recommendations ==
=== England ===
The Boundary Commission for England released its "Initial Proposals" to the public on 13 September 2011. Their provisional recommendations did not require division of any electoral ward.

Amongst the proposals, Prime Minister David Cameron (Witney) and Leader of the Opposition Ed Miliband (Doncaster North) would have seen their seats remain intact with no changes. Deputy Prime Minister Nick Clegg's seat of Sheffield Hallam would have been altered into the proposed "Sheffield West and Penistone".

The Isle of Wight was to be divided into two almost equal halves. The so-called Devonwall constituency, sharing wards between neighbouring Devon and Cornwall, was suggested as "Bideford and Bude".

=== Scotland ===
The Initial Proposal from the Boundary Commission for Scotland was released at midnight on 13 October 2011. Amongst their proposals were six prefixed by the word "Glasgow", a reduction of one across the city. Former Liberal Democrat leader Charles Kennedy's seat of Ross, Skye and Lochaber was to be divided between three other seats covering the Highlands, and Argyll and Bute. Former Prime Minister Gordon Brown's seat, Kirkcaldy and Cowdenbeath, would also have been redrawn into a newly configured "Kirkcaldy and Glenrothes". Public consultation closed in January 2012.

=== Northern Ireland ===
On 13 September 2011, the Northern Ireland Commission proposed to reduce the number of Belfast seats by one, and create a newly formed "Glenshane", named after the Glenshane Pass. The official response of the Democratic Unionist Party criticised the proposals as having "the stench of gerrymander" and having "a disproportionately negative impact upon Unionism". The Ulster Unionist Party identified "particular disquiet" in specific towns as a result of the provisional proposals but accepted that there was "limited room for manoeuvre".

=== Wales ===
The Boundary Commission for Wales released its provisional recommendations on 11 January 2012. Cardiff had its representation cut by one, the Isle of Anglesey was joined with Bangor and Bethesda in a new seat styled "Menai ac Ynys Môn", and Merthyr Tydfil was brought into a new constituency named "Heads of the Valley". Four electoral wards were to be divided between constituencies.

== Revised recommendations ==
There was a statutory eight-week consultation period for responding to revised recommendations, if any are required.

=== England ===
Revised recommendations for the English regions were published on 16 October. Unlike in the initial proposals, the Commission split (or divided) some electoral wards between seats, specifically in Tewkesbury and Gloucester. Additionally, the Isle of Wight was divided east/west and the cross-border Devon-Cornwall proposed seat considered some sort of 'Devonwall seat' by local critics arguing the difference between the counties trumps the ideals of equal apportionment, was modified to bear proposed name 'Bideford, Bude and Launceston'.

=== Scotland ===
The Boundary Commission for Scotland released its revised recommendations on 13 September 2012. Of the 50 mainland constituencies initially recommended, 24 went unchanged, thirteen only had new boundaries recommended and five had both boundaries and names changed, whilst eight were just given new names ('Ayr North, Troon and Cumnock', 'Ayrshire Central and Arran', 'Edinburgh South East', 'Galloway, Ayr South and Carrick', 'Glasgow South', 'Inverclyde and Renfrewshire West', 'Renfrewshire South and Ayrshire North', and 'West Dunbartonshire and Bearsden North').

=== Northern Ireland ===
On 16 October 2012, the Northern Irish Commission confirmed alterations to their proposed Antrim, Fermanagh and Tyrone seats.

=== Wales ===
Revised recommendations for Wales were published on 24 October. Almost all the initial proposals were altered, so as to place Machynlleth in a 'Brecon, Radnor and Montgomery' seat, and to rename proposed constituencies across North Wales as Ynys Môn a Bangor, 'Conwy and Colwyn', and 'Flint and North Denbighshire'.

== Political and economic impact and controversy ==
The review was not without controversy. A spokesperson for the opposition Labour Party told the BBC "political motives" were behind the changes when they were introduced. Labour's former Shadow Scottish Secretary, Ann McKechin, called the process "gerrymandering", whilst her successor Margaret Curran criticised "Nick Clegg's plan to gerrymander Scotland". Former Conservative Minister Sir Malcolm Rifkind labelled the proposals "a muddle". Labour MP for Preston, Mark Hendrick, labelled the proposals "gerrymandering to curry political persuasion".

In June 2011, research company Democratic Audit published its findings about the review of constituency boundaries. The organisation attempted to create a set of boundaries for the UK according to the new rules, and to examine their political consequences. Their studies suggested that the Liberal Democrats could lose "a quarter" of their current seats. Provisional notional results published in January 2012 calculated that the Conservatives could have won 299 seats under the new boundaries.

In August 2012 the House of Lords Reform Bill 2012 was dropped by the Government, after disagreements between members of the Conservative and Liberal Democrat parties. In response, Deputy Prime Minister Nick Clegg confirmed that he would instruct his MPs to vote against the Sixth Periodic Review, although David Cameron vowed to pass the necessary orders regardless.

On 30 October, an amendment to the Electoral Registration and Administration Bill was tabled by Labour and Liberal Democrat peers which would postpone the Sixth Periodic Review until 2018. On the following day, Labour peer Lord Hart, crossbencher Lord Kerr, Liberal Democrat peer Lord Rennard, and former Plaid Cymru leader Lord Wigley tabled an amendment to the same Bill to postpone the Sixth Review until 2018. During 14 January debate, Deputy Prime Minister Nick Clegg received personal criticism of the position Lords found themselves in: former Scottish Secretary Lord Forsyth accused Clegg of "going from 'cross' to 'double cross'".

In October 2012, Lord Wallace told the House of Lords that the boundary commissions had spent £5.8 million as of August 2012 and would spend a further £3.8 million from September 2012 until the end of the Review.

== Termination of review ==
On 31 January 2013 the four commissions issued statements announcing that they would not be continuing with the review. The English Boundary Commission officially closed their portion of the Sixth Periodic Review. The Boundary Commission for Scotland closed its part of the review confirming they would not be completing it. The Boundary Commission for Northern Ireland also announced they had ended the review and would not be reporting to the Secretary of State for Northern Ireland. The Boundary Commission for Wales stated they were cancelling the review, and would not finalise the development of their recommendations.

== See also ==
- Fifth periodic review of Westminster constituencies
- 2018 periodic review of Westminster constituencies
- 2023 review of Westminster constituencies
- Constituencies of the Parliament of the United Kingdom
