= Speaker's Committee for the Independent Parliamentary Standards Authority =

The Speaker's Committee for the Independent Parliamentary Standards Authority, or 'SCIPSA', is a body created under the Parliamentary Standards Act 2009 to scrutinise the UK's Independent Parliamentary Standards Authority. The committee's purposes are to approve the members of IPSA and to scrutinize and approve its estimate (or budget). The chair and members of IPSA are selected on an Address to the King from the House of Commons, but the names are chosen by the Speaker with the agreement of SCIPSA.

== Composition ==
The committee comprises eight MPs and three lay members. The MPs are: the Speaker of the House of Commons (who also serves as its chair), the Leader of the House of Commons, the chair of the Standards and Privileges Select Committee, and five others appointed by the House of Commons who are not Ministers of the Crown. The Shadow Leader of the House has been appointed as one of the opposition members of the committee since its inception, but the act creating it does not specify she will be a member and does not assign a member to be nominated by the Leader of the Opposition as is done to provide that result with the House of Commons Commission.

== Membership ==
The current members of SCIPSA, as of May 2025 are:

Member	Party	Constituency
Sir Lindsay Hoyle MP	Speaker	Chorley
Marie Goldman MP	Liberal Democrat	Chelmsford
Gordon McKee MP	Labour	Glasgow South
Jesse Norman MP	Conservative	Hereford and South Herefordshire
Alberto Costa MP	Conservative	South Leicestershire
Leigh Ingham MP	Labour	Stafford
Charlotte Nichols MP	Labour	Warrington North
Lucy Powell MP	Labour	Manchester Central

The two lay members, are, as of May 2025 are Tina Fahm and Theresa Middleton.

== See also ==
- Parliamentary committees of the United Kingdom
