= Fifth periodic review of Westminster constituencies =

2000s review of UK electoral boundaries

The fifth periodic review of Westminster constituencies was undertaken between 2000 and 2007 by the four boundary commissions for England, Scotland, Wales and Northern Ireland for the UK Parliament. The changes for England, Wales and Northern Ireland took effect at the 2010 general election; that for Scotland took effect at the 2005 election. Changes were also made to the constituencies and electoral regions of the then National Assembly for Wales (now the Senedd), and took effect at the 2007 Assembly election. All of the recommendations were approved.

== Review process ==
The boundary commissions were required at the time by the Parliamentary Constituencies Act 1986 to review constituencies in their part of the United Kingdom every eight to twelve years. The commissions' recommendations from the review were based on the numbers of electors on the electoral register and ward boundaries at the start of the review in 2000.

In Scotland, the recommendations were submitted in November 2004, and approved in February 2005. In Wales, the recommendations were submitted on 31 January 2005, and approved on 11 April 2006. In England, the recommendations were submitted on 31 October 2006, and approved on 13 June 2007. In Northern Ireland, the recommendations were submitted on 14 September 2007 and approved on 11 June 2008.

== Summary of changes ==
The nominal results of the 2005 election on the new boundaries (note that Scotland remained the same from 2005).

These were the first major changes to UK Parliamentary constituencies since 1997.

As set out in the approval dates above, the Scottish changes were effective from the 2005 general election. The post-2010 shape of those for the rest of the UK can be viewed alongside those for Scotland of 2005 at United Kingdom Parliament constituencies.

A side effect of reviews is the number of seats won by each party may change (even if all voters repeated their votes at later elections).

The total number of Scottish seats dropped from 72 to 59, due to changes made by the Scotland Act 1998, applying the English electoral quota to Scotland. This had reduced total seats back down (Note: From 1922 to 1945 the number of seats was 615. It rose from 635 to 650 in 1983 and incrementally rose to 659 for the years 1997 to 2005.) from 659 to 646, pending the review of the rest of the UK.

In Wales, changes were made not only to the Westminster constituencies but also to the constituencies and electoral regions of the then National Assembly, which at the time used the same constituency boundaries. This was the first time the Assembly's boundaries were changed. The total number of constituencies remained 40, but entailed radical redrawing in Clwyd and in Gwynedd. Aberconwy, Arfon and Dwyfor Meirionnydd replaced Conwy, Caernarfon and Meirionnydd Nant Conwy respectively. 18 seats were unchanged with only minor changes elsewhere. The boundaries of the Assembly's electoral regions were changed accordingly to reflect constituency changes, thusly the only major changes were to the boundary between North Wales and Mid and West Wales. Per 2006 statistics, Welsh constituencies had on average 16,000 fewer electors than those of England.

In Northern Ireland, the Boundary Commission recommended that the number of seats remained at 18, with minor changes to 12 of these, primarily in the east of the province.

In England, the seats recommended seldom straddle the largest council areas, i.e. counties (metropolitan or otherwise); however they may cross boundaries of unitary authorities. York was consolidated to have two seats, without electoral wards from North Yorkshire. The unitary authorities of Berkshire are represented in Westminster by many cross-authority seats.

The Boundary Commission for England created one extra seat each to represent ten non-metropolitan counties: Cornwall, Derbyshire, Devon, Essex, Hampshire, Lancashire, Norfolk, Northamptonshire, Warwickshire and Wiltshire; and one covering the area of the former county of Avon. This was partly offset by the abolition of one seat in each of the six metropolitan counties of Greater Manchester, Merseyside, Tyne and Wear, South Yorkshire, West Midlands and West Yorkshire, together with a net loss of one seat in Greater London.

London was reviewed borough-by-borough – some were "paired". This means they see one or more straddling seats. This solution ensures that the sizes of the electorates are not too disparate, in other words, quite fairly apportioned to reflect the adult resident population. Two boroughs lost a seat and one area of central London gained a constituency.

The approved recommendations for the three countries saw a net increase of 4 seats from 646 to 650 (for the 2010 general election).

== Detailed changes – England (2010) ==
=== New and abolished constituencies ===
As a result of changes to the names of seats, it is not always easy to clearly identify newly created constituencies or those abolished during the review process. One way of considering this is to link each proposed seat with an existing seat which contributes the most voters to that new seat. Any proposed seat which cannot be linked to an existing seat is then considered to be a "new" constituency. Conversely, any existing seat which is not linked to a proposed seat is considered to have been abolished.

Accordingly, the following seats are regarded as new creations:

- Central Devon
- Chelsea and Fulham
- Chippenham
- Filton and Bradley Stoke
- Kenilworth and Southam
- Meon Valley
- Mid Derbyshire
- Mid Norfolk (as reconfigured)
- South Northamptonshire
- St Austell and Newquay
- Witham
- Wyre and Preston North

NB – the existing seat of Mid Norfolk is succeeded by Broadland (see below) and the reconfigured Mid Norfolk is therefore considered to be a new constituency.

The following constituencies are regarded as having been abolished by the review process:

- Barnsley West and Penistone
- Birmingham Selly Oak (existing configuration)
- Brent East
- Eccles
- Hornchurch
- Knowsley North and Sefton East
- Normanton
- Sunderland South

NB – the proposed constituency of Birmingham Selly Oak is preceded by the existing constituency of Birmingham Hall Green; and, in turn, the proposed constituency of Birmingham Hall Green is preceded by Birmingham Sparkbrook and Small Heath (see below).

=== Name changes ===
There was a total of 72 linked constituencies which involved a change of name. A majority of these involved significant changes resulting from the knock-on impact of new or abolished seats within review areas. However, some arose from the consultation process and involved only minor changes. The table below lists those constituencies with name changes, indicating the extent of the changes by reference to the proportion of the old constituency included in the new constituency, or the proportion of the new in the old, which ever is the lesser:

- Minor – greater than 90%
- Moderate – between 75% and 90%
- Major – between 75% and 50%
- Wholesale – less than 50%

| County/authority | Old seat | New seat | Extent of change |
|---|---|---|---|
| Barking and Dagenham/Havering | Dagenham | Dagenham and Rainham | Major |
| Barking and Dagenham/Havering | Upminster | Hornchurch and Upminster | Major |
| Bath and North East Somerset | Wansdyke | North East Somerset | Moderate |
| Brent/Camden | Brent South | Brent Central | Wholesale |
| Brent/Camden | Hampstead and Highgate | Hampstead and Kilburn | Major |
| Bromley/Lewisham | Lewisham West | Lewisham West and Penge | Major |
| Cornwall | Falmouth and Camborne | Camborne and Redruth | Major |
| Cornwall | Truro and St Austell | Truro and Falmouth | Major |
| Derbyshire | West Derbyshire | Derbyshire Dales | Major |
| Devon | Teignbridge | Newton Abbot | Major |
| Ealing/Hammersmith | Ealing, Acton and Shepherd's Bush | Ealing Central and Acton | Major |
| Essex | Basildon | South Basildon and East Thurrock | Major |
| Essex | Billericay | Basildon and Billericay | Wholesale |
| Essex | Harwich | Clacton | Moderate |
| Essex | Maldon and East Chelmsford | Maldon | Major |
| Essex | North Essex | Harwich and North Essex | Major |
| Essex | Rayleigh | Rayleigh and Wickford | Major |
| Essex | West Chelmsford | Chelmsford | Moderate |
| Gloucestershire | Cotswold | The Cotswolds | Minor |
| Greater Manchester | Manchester, Blackley | Blackley and Broughton | Major |
| Greater Manchester | Salford | Salford and Eccles | Major |
| Greater Manchester | Worsley | Worsley and Eccles South | Major |
| Hammersmith and Fulham/ Kensington and Chelsea | Hammersmith and Fulham | Hammersmith | Major |
| Hammersmith and Fulham/ Kensington and Chelsea | Kensington and Chelsea | Kensington | Major |
| Hampshire/Southampton | Romsey | Romsey and Southampton North | Moderate |
| Harrow/Hillingdon | Ruislip-Northwood | Ruislip, Northwood and Pinner | Major |
| Harrow/Hillingdon | Uxbridge | Uxbridge and South Ruislip | Major |
| Herefordshire/Worcestershire | Hereford | Hereford and South Herefordshire | Minor |
| Herefordshire/Worcestershire | Leominster | North Herefordshire | Moderate |
| Kensington and Chelsea/ Westminster | Regent's Park and Kensington North | Westminster North | Major |
| Kent | Gillingham | Gillingham and Rainham | Minor |
| Kent | Medway | Rochester and Strood | Moderate |
| Lambeth/Southwark | North Southwark and Bermondsey | Bermondsey and Old Southwark | Minor |
| Lancashire/Blackpool | Blackpool North and Fleetwood | Blackpool North and Cleveleys | Major |
| Lancashire/Blackpool | Lancaster and Wyre | Lancaster and Fleetwood | Major |
| Leicestershire | Blaby | South Leicestershire | Minor |
| Merseyside | Crosby | Sefton Central | Major |
| Merseyside | Knowsley South | Knowsley | Major |
| Merseyside | Liverpool, Garston | Garston and Halewood | Moderate |
| Merseyside | St Helens South | St Helens South and Whiston | Moderate |
| Milton Keynes | North East Milton Keynes | Milton Keynes North | Moderate |
| Milton Keynes | Milton Keynes South West | Milton Keynes South | Moderate |
| Newham/Tower Hamlets | Poplar and Canning Town | Poplar and Limehouse | Major |
| Norfolk | Mid Norfolk | Broadland | Major |
| North Somerset | Woodspring | North Somerset | Minor |
| North Yorkshire/York | City of York | York Central | Moderate |
| North Yorkshire/York | Ryedale | Thirsk and Malton | Major |
| North Yorkshire/York | Selby | Selby and Ainsty | Moderate |
| North Yorkshire/York | Vale of York | York Outer | Wholesale |
| Plymouth | Plymouth Devonport | Plymouth Moor View | Moderate |
| Plymouth | Plymouth Sutton | Plymouth Sutton and Devonport | Moderate |
| Somerset | Bridgwater | Bridgwater and West Somerset | Minor |
| Somerset | Taunton | Taunton Deane | Minor |
| South Gloucestershire | Northavon | Thornbury and Yate | Moderate |
| South Yorkshire | Barnsley East and Mexborough | Barnsley East | Wholesale |
| South Yorkshire | Sheffield, Attercliffe | Sheffield South East | Minor |
| South Yorkshire | Sheffield, Brightside | Sheffield, Brightside and Hillsborough | Major |
| South Yorkshire | Sheffield, Hillsborough | Penistone and Stocksbridge | Major |
| South Yorkshire | Wentworth | Wentworth and Deane | Moderate |
| Tyne and Wear | Gateshead East and Washington West | Washington and Sunderland West | Wholesale |
| Tyne and Wear | Houghton and Washington East | Houghton and Sunderland South | Major |
| Tyne and Wear | Newcastle upon Tyne East and Wallsend | Newcastle upon Tyne East | Major |
| Tyne and Wear | Sunderland North | Sunderland Central | Major |
| Tyne and Wear | Tyne Bridge | Gateshead | Wholesale |
| Warwickshire | Rugby and Kenilworth | Rugby | Major |
| West Midlands | Birmingham, Hall Green | Birmingham, Selly Oak | Wholesale |
| West Midlands | Birmingham, Sparkbrook and Small Heath | Birmingham, Hall Green | Wholesale |
| West Yorkshire | Bradford North | Bradford East | Moderate |
| West Yorkshire | Elmet | Elmet and Rothwell | Moderate |
| West Yorkshire | Morley and Rothwell | Morley and Outwood | Major |
| West Yorkshire | Pontefract and Castleford | Normanton, Pontefract and Castleford | Moderate |
| Wiltshire | Westbury | South West Wiltshire | Moderate |

=== Other major changes ===
In addition to the changes listed above, the following 45 constituencies were subject to major changes whilst retaining their names.

| County/authority | Constituency |
|---|---|
| Barking and Dagenham/Havering | Barking |
| Brent/Camden | Brent North |
| Bristol | Bristol East |
| Bristol | Bristol North West |
| Bristol | Bristol West |
| Bromley/Lewisham | Beckenham |
| Bromley/Lewisham | Bromley and Chislehurst |
| Bromley/Lewisham | Lewisham East |
| Cornwall | North Cornwall |
| Derbyshire | Derby North |
| Derbyshire | Derby South |
| Devon | East Devon |
| Devon | Tiverton and Honiton |
| Ealing | Ealing, Southall |
| Essex | Braintree |
| Essex | Saffron Walden |
| Greater Manchester | Leigh |
| Greater Manchester | Makerfield |
| Hampshire | East Hampshire |
| Hampshire | North East Hampshire |
| Hampshire | Winchester |
| Harrow/Hillingdon | Harrow West |
| Lambeth/Southwark | Camberwell and Peckham |
| Lancashire | Ribble Valley |
| Newham/Tower Hamlets | West Ham |
| Norfolk | South West Norfolk |
| Northamptonshire | Daventry |
| Northamptonshire | Northampton South |
| South Gloucestershire | Kingswood |
| South Yorkshire | Barnsley Central |
| South Yorkshire | Doncaster North |
| South Yorkshire | Sheffield Central |
| South Yorkshire | Sheffield, Hallam |
| Tyne and Wear | Newcastle upon Tyne Central |
| Warwickshire | Stratford-on-Avon |
| West Midlands | Birmingham, Hodge Hill |
| West Midlands | Birmingham, Ladywood |
| West Midlands | Birmingham, Northfield |
| West Midlands | Birmingham, Yardley |
| West Yorkshire | Dewsbury |
| West Yorkshire | Leeds Central |
| West Yorkshire | Leeds East |
| West Yorkshire | Wakefield |
| Wiltshire | Devizes |
| Wiltshire | North Wiltshire |

== Detailed changes – Scotland (2005) ==
The reduction in the number of seats from 72 to 59, combined with the 1996 reorganisation of local government under the Local Government etc. (Scotland) Act 1994, resulted in a significant reconfiguration of constituencies in Scotland. Only three seats remained unchanged: East Renfrewshire (formerly named Eastwood), and quota-immune Orkney and Shetland, and Na h-Eileanan an Iar (formerly named Western Isles). A further 22 seats were retained with increased electorates of varying amounts, with 47 abolished constituencies being offset by 34 new ones.

No changes were made to the constituencies and electoral regions of the Scottish Parliament, as the Scottish Parliament (Constituencies) Act 2004 delinked the constituency from those used for Westminster elections. The first First periodic review of Scottish Parliament boundaries would be held and its recommendations implemented for the 2011 Scottish Parliament election.

The table below lists all Scottish seats before and after the redistribution, linking new and abolished seats where applicable, as described above.

| Region (before 1996) | Old seat | New seat | Council area |
|---|---|---|---|
| Highland | Caithness, Sutherland and Easter Ross | Caithness, Sutherland and Easter Ross | Highland |
| Highland | Inverness East, Nairn and Lochaber | Inverness, Nairn, Badenoch and Strathspey | Highland |
| Highland | Ross, Skye and Inverness West | Ross, Skye and Lochaber | Highland |
| Grampian | Moray | Moray | Moray |
| Grampian | Aberdeen North | N/A | |
| Grampian | Aberdeen Central | Aberdeen North | Aberdeen / Aberdeenshire |
| Grampian | Aberdeen South | Aberdeen South | Aberdeen / Aberdeenshire |
| Grampian | Banff and Buchan | Banff and Buchan | Aberdeen / Aberdeenshire |
| Grampian | Gordon | Gordon | Aberdeen / Aberdeenshire |
| Grampian | West Aberdeenshire and Kincardine | West Aberdeenshire and Kincardine | Aberdeen / Aberdeenshire |
| Fife | Dunfermline East | N/A | |
| Fife | Dunfermline West | Dunfermline and West Fife | Fife |
| Fife | Central Fife | Glenrothes | Fife |
| Fife | Kirkcaldy | Kirkcaldy and Cowdenbeath | Fife |
| Fife | North East Fife | North East Fife | Fife |
| Tayside / Central | Angus | Angus | Angus / Dundee |
| Tayside / Central | Dundee East | Dundee East | Angus / Dundee |
| Tayside / Central | Dundee West | Dundee West | Angus / Dundee |
| Tayside / Central | North Tayside | N/A | |
| Tayside / Central | Perth | Perth and North Perthshire | Clackmannanshire / Perth and Kinross |
| Tayside / Central | Ochil | Ochil and South Perthshire | Clackmannanshire / Perth and Kinross |
| Tayside / Central | Stirling | Stirling | Stirling |
| Tayside / Central | Falkirk East | N/A | |
| Tayside / Central | Falkirk West | Falkirk | Falkirk / West Lothian |
| Lothian / Borders | Linlithgow | Linlithgow and East Falkirk | Falkirk / West Lothian |
| Lothian / Borders | Livingston | Livingston | Falkirk / West Lothian |
| Lothian / Borders | Edinburgh Central | N/A | |
| Lothian / Borders | Edinburgh East and Musselburgh | Edinburgh East | Edinburgh |
| Lothian / Borders | Edinburgh North and Leith | Edinburgh North and Leith | Edinburgh |
| Lothian / Borders | Edinburgh Pentlands | Edinburgh South West | Edinburgh |
| Lothian / Borders | Edinburgh South | Edinburgh South | Edinburgh |
| Lothian / Borders | Edinburgh West | Edinburgh West | Edinburgh |
| Lothian / Borders | East Lothian | East Lothian | East Lothian |
| Lothian / Borders | Midlothian | Midlothian | Midlothian |
| Lothian / Borders | Tweeddale, Ettrick and Lauderdale | N/A | |
| Lothian / Borders | Roxburgh and Berwickshire | Berwickshire, Roxburgh and Selkirk | Borders / Dumfries and Galloway / South Lanarkshire |
| Dumfries and Galloway | Dumfries | Dumfriesshire, Clydesdale and Tweeddale | Borders / Dumfries and Galloway / South Lanarkshire |
| Dumfries and Galloway | Galloway and Upper Nithsdale | Dumfries and Galloway | Borders / Dumfries and Galloway / South Lanarkshire |
| Strathclyde | Clydesdale | Lanark and Hamilton East | Borders / Dumfries and Galloway / South Lanarkshire |
| Strathclyde | East Kilbride | East Kilbride, Strathaven and Lesmahagow | Borders / Dumfries and Galloway / South Lanarkshire |
| Strathclyde | Glasgow Rutherglen | Rutherglen and Hamilton West | Borders / Dumfries and Galloway / South Lanarkshire |
| Strathclyde | Hamilton South | N/A | |
| Strathclyde | Argyll and Bute | Argyll and Bute | Argyll and Bute |
| Strathclyde | Dumbarton | West Dunbartonshire | West Dunbartonshire |
| Strathclyde | Clydebank and Milngavie | N/A | |
| Strathclyde | Strathkelvin and Bearsden | East Dunbartonshire | East Dunbartonshire / North Lanarkshire |
| Strathclyde | Cumbernauld and Kilsyth | Cumbernauld, Kilsyth and Kirkintilloch East | East Dunbartonshire / North Lanarkshire |
| Strathclyde | Coatbridge and Chryston | Coatbridge, Chryston and Bellshill | East Dunbartonshire / North Lanarkshire |
| Strathclyde | Airdrie and Shotts | Airdrie and Shotts | East Dunbartonshire / North Lanarkshire |
| Strathclyde | Motherwell and Wishaw | Motherwell and Wishaw | East Dunbartonshire / North Lanarkshire |
| Strathclyde | Hamilton North and Bellshill | N/A | |
| Strathclyde | Glasgow Kelvin | N/A | |
| Strathclyde | Glasgow Anniesland | Glasgow North West | Glasgow |
| Strathclyde | Glasgow Maryhill | Glasgow North | Glasgow |
| Strathclyde | Glasgow Springburn | Glasgow North East | Glasgow |
| Strathclyde | Glasgow Baillieston | Glasgow East | Glasgow |
| Strathclyde | Glasgow Shettleston | Glasgow Central | Glasgow |
| Strathclyde | Glasgow Cathcart | Glasgow South | Glasgow |
| Strathclyde | Glasgow Pollok | Glasgow South West | Glasgow |
| Strathclyde | Glasgow Govan | N/A | |
| Strathclyde | Greenock and Inverclyde | Inverclyde | Inverclyde |
| Strathclyde | West Renfrewshire | N/A | |
| Strathclyde | Paisley North | Paisley and Renfrewshire North | Renfrewshire |
| Strathclyde | Paisley South | Paisley and Renfrewshire South | Renfrewshire |
| Strathclyde | Eastwood | East Renfrewshire | East Renfrewshire |
| Strathclyde | Cunninghame South | N/A | |
| Strathclyde | Cunninghame North | North Ayrshire and Arran | East Ayrshire / North Ayrshire / South Ayrshire |
| Strathclyde | Kilmarnock and Loudoun | Kilmarnock and Loudoun | East Ayrshire / North Ayrshire / South Ayrshire |
| Strathclyde | Ayr | Central Ayrshire | East Ayrshire / North Ayrshire / South Ayrshire |
| Strathclyde | Carrick, Cumnock and Doon Valley | Ayr, Carrick and Cumnock | East Ayrshire / North Ayrshire / South Ayrshire |
| Orkney Islands / Shetland Islands | Orkney and Shetland | Orkney and Shetland | Orkney Islands / Shetland Islands |
| Western Isles | Western Isles | Na h-Eileanan an Iar | Na h-Eileanan Siar |

== See also ==
- 2023 review of Westminster constituencies (next review to have its recommendations implemented)
- 2018 periodic review of Westminster constituencies (recommendations never implemented)
- 2013 periodic review of Westminster constituencies (recommendations never implemented)
- Fourth periodic review of Westminster constituencies (previous review)
- Constituencies of the Parliament of the United Kingdom

== Bibliography ==
- Fifth Periodical Report, Boundary Commission for England, ISBN 0-10-170322-8. Contains list of boundary changes in England.
- Fifth Periodical Report, Boundary Commission for Northern Ireland, ISBN 978-0-10-173212-3. Contains list of boundary changes in Northern Ireland.
- Fifth Periodical Report, Boundary Commission for Scotland, ISBN 9780101642729. Contains list of boundary changes in Scotland
- Fifth Periodical Report, Boundary Commission for Wales, ISBN 0-10-293660-9. Contains list of boundary changes in Wales.
