= 2018 periodic review of Westminster constituencies =

Failed review of UK electoral boundaries

The 2018 periodic review of Westminster constituencies was an ultimately unfruitful cycle of the process by which constituencies of the House of Commons of the United Kingdom are reviewed and redistributed. The four UK boundary commissions carried out their reviews between 2016 and 2018, but their recommendations were not taken up by the government and were formally laid aside in 2020.

The boundary commissions were to take into account revised rules for the number and size (electoral quota) of constituencies. The proposed changes included having a total of 600 seats rather than 650, as agreed by Parliament in 2011 to meet a reformist aim of the 2010–2015 coalition agreement.

The 2013 periodic review of Westminster constituencies began in 2011 and was intended to be completed by 2013, but a January 2013 vote in the House of Commons stopped the process. The commissions re-commenced their drawing of new boundaries from scratch in 2016, and completed their work in September 2018. Although the proposals were immediately laid before Parliament they were not brought forward by the government for approval. Accordingly, they did not come into effect for the 2019 election, which was contested on 12 December 2019 using the constituency boundaries in place since 2010, as constituted by the fifth periodic review.

The 2018 Review was formally abandoned with the passing of the Parliamentary Constituencies Act 2020, which received Royal Assent on 14 December 2020. The following reviews began in 2021 and concluded in 2023.

== Conclusion ==
The four boundary commissions submitted their final recommendations to the secretary of state on 5 September 2018, and made their reports public a week later. Leader of the House of Commons Andrea Leadsom told the House on 13 September 2018 that "it will be some time" before the necessary statutory instruments can be put forward for approval by both the Commons and the Lords. The proposals were not put forward for approval prior to the calling of the general election held on 12 December 2019, which was contested using the constituency boundaries in place since 2010, as constituted by the fifth periodic review.

Following the 2019 election victory by the Conservative Party, the Government indicated that the Sixth Review would not be implemented. This required primary legislation, as the Government is legally required to give effect to the recommendations from the boundary commissions as set out in their 2018 reports. In addition, it is proposed that the next review, currently due to be completed by 2023, is to be based on a total of 650 seats rather than 600, thereby retaining the current number of MPs.

In May 2020, the government published the Parliamentary Constituencies Bill which, when passed as an Act of Parliament, would formally conclude the provisions of the legislation which created the sixth periodic review by:

[...remov[ing] the duty on the Government to implement the 2018 boundary review recommendations, and the requirement, under section 14 of the PVSC Act 2011 (as amended by the Electoral Registration and Administration Act 2013), to make arrangements, by 30 November 2020, to review the effects of the reduction in the number of constituencies to 600.

The Parliamentary Constituencies Act received Royal Assent on 14 December 2020. Under Clause 10, the duty to implement the "current" recommendations of the boundary commissions ceased to have effect on 24 March 2020.

== Background ==
The 2013 review process was launched on 4 March 2011 by the Boundary Commission for England, Boundary Commission for Scotland, Boundary Commission for Northern Ireland and Boundary Commission for Wales. The changes were to be implemented by virtue of the Parliamentary Voting System and Constituencies Act 2011, which amended the Parliamentary Constituencies Act 1986. Part II of the Act (henceforth referred to as 'PVSaCA') deals with the amendments to the manner in which House of Commons constituencies are formed by the individual boundary commissions. Each commission was obliged to make a final report to the Secretary of State before 1 October 2013 (by virtue of Section 10, Clause 3, which amends Subsection 2 of Section 3 of the 1986 Act).

Following a debate in the House of Lords on 14 January 2013, the Opposition tabled and voted for an amendment to legislation to postpone the date by which the Review ends, which they passed and sent back to the Commons, on a relatively small 69-vote majority. A Commons vote on 29 January 2013 in agreement meant the review instead began after May 2015 for completion in 2018. The Review had been required for completion by October 2013 under the principles of Section 3 of the Parliamentary Constituencies Act 1986 (themselves loosening previous requirements by instead calling for periodic reviews every eight to twelve years) as left intact by Part 2 of the Parliamentary Voting System and Constituencies Act 2011. The Electoral Registration and Administration Act 2013 superseded these principles to make an exception for this Review, delaying it until 2018.

Following the 2015 election, the majority Conservative government considered the boundary review as a priority. In July 2015, then Prime Minister David Cameron reiterated his plan to go ahead with reducing the number of Members of Parliament and "cut the cost of politics", saying the proposals were "the right approach". In 2016 each of the four parliamentary boundary commissions of the United Kingdom re-commenced the review process.

The Conservatives won the most seats at the general election in June 2017. The party's manifesto included a pledge to carry on with the review process and reduce the number of MPs to 600. In February 2018, Prime Minister Theresa May was urged by the Public Administration and Constitutional Affairs Select Committee to deal with the boundary review process as a matter of priority.

=== Protected constituencies ===
PVSaCA 'protected' three island constituencies from sharing a seat with another seat outside of the island seats, and they must be rounded up to a whole number of seats based on their population and the electorate quota. They are:

- Orkney and Shetland – one seat
- Na h-Eileanan an Iar (the Western Isles of Scotland) – one seat
- The Isle of Wight – two seats

== Timetable ==
In July 2016 the Boundary Commission for England published its guide to the 2018 review. In it, the date for publishing provisional recommendations was set at the week beginning 12 September 2016. The Welsh Commission aimed to publish their Initial Proposals on 13 September 2016.

== Distribution of seats ==
The total of 600 constituencies required by the Act were allocated between the four countries of the UK as shown in the table below. The English boundary commission then announced that the number of constituencies allocated to England would be sub-divided by region, with the aim of producing "initial proposals in which each constituency is wholly contained within a single region". The seats allocated to each region are also shown below.

=== United Kingdom ===
Nation	2010/15/17/19 seats	2013 review				2018 review			
Nation	2010/15/17/19 seats	Electorate	Allocation	Change	Average size	Electorate	Allocation	Change	Average size
England *	532	38,332,557	500	−32	76,665	37,294,494	499	−33	74,738
(Isle of Wight)	1	110,924	2	+1	55,462	105,448	2	+1	52,724
Northern Ireland	18	1,190,635	16	−2	74,415	1,243,369	17	−1	73,139
Scotland *	57	3,873,387	50	−7	77,468	3,842,736	51	−6	75,348
(Orkney and Shetland)	1	33,755	1	—	33,755	33,229	1	—	33,229
(Na h-Eileanan an Iar)	1	21,837	1	—	21,837	20,887	1	—	20,887
Wales	40	2,281,596	30	−10	76,053	2,181,841	29	−11	75,236
Total	650	45,844,691	600	−50	76,408	44,562,440	600	−50	74,270

* Excluding the protected island areas

=== Regions of England ===
Region	2010/15/17/19 seats	2013 review				2018 review			
Region	2010/15/17/19 seats	Electorate	Allocation	Change	Average size	Electorate	Allocation	Change	Average size
Eastern	58	4,280,707	56	−2	76,441	4,242,266	57	−1	74,426
East Midlands	46	3,361,089	44	−2	76,388	3,275,046	44	−2	74,433
London	73	5,266,904	68	−5	77,454	5,118,884	68	−5	75,278
North East	29	1,971,249	26	−3	75,817	1,874,396	25	−4	74,976
North West	75	5,253,019	68	−7	77,250	5,074,302	68	−7	74,622
South East *	83	6,192,504	81	−2	76,450	6,067,475	81	−2	74,907
South West	55	4,042,475	53	−2	76,273	3,930,770	53	−2	74,165
West Midlands	59	4,115,668	54	−5	76,216	3,989,320	53	−6	75,270
Yorkshire and the Humber	54	3,848,942	50	−4	76,979	3,722,035	50	−4	74,441
Total	532*	38,332,557	500	−32	76,665	37,294,494	499	–33	74,738

* Excluding the protected Isle of Wight

== Practical considerations ==
The four commissions published descriptions of how they would carry out their work, and held meetings with representatives of political parties to explain their approach in the light of the more restrictive rules to which they have to work.

For example, the Boundary Commission for England stated in its 2011 newsletter: "The Commission wishes to make very clear that those with an interest in the review process should understand that the defined number of constituencies and the 5% electoral parity target are statutory requirements that it must apply and that it has absolutely no discretion in respect of either matter."

In February 2016 the BCE released conclusions from a meeting with representatives from political parties, confirming that the 2013 review would not be used as the basis for the 2018 review and they would consider splitting electoral wards where necessary. In July 2016 the English commission explained their policy towards splitting electoral wards as follows:

The BCE recognises that in a few cases there may be exceptional and compelling circumstances ... that may make it appropriate to divide a ward. Strong evidence and justification will need to be provided in any constituency scheme that proposes to split a ward, and the number of such ward splits should be kept to an absolute minimum. Examples of circumstances in which the BCE might propose splitting a ward could include: a) where all the possible "whole ward" options in an area would significantly cut across local ties; or b) where splitting a single ward may prevent a significant "domino effect" of otherwise unnecessary change to a chain of constituencies.

=== Composition of constituencies ===
At a meeting held in February 2016, the Boundary Commission for Wales confirmed it would recommend 29 constituencies in September of that year. In the same meeting the Commission said it would "avoid splitting electoral wards and communities where it was possible to do so".

The Scottish Commission expected few, if any, existing constituencies to remain unchanged and new seats "probably not" all to be constructed from complete electoral wards. The Northern Ireland Commission expected "few, if any" constituencies to remain the same.

== Provisional recommendations ==
=== England ===
The Boundary Commission for England confirmed its provisional recommendations on 13 September 2016.

=== Scotland ===
The Scottish proposals were published in October 2016. The changes include reducing the number of seats in Glasgow by one.

=== Wales ===
The Welsh Commission published its recommendations on 13 September 2016, reducing the number of constituencies by over a quarter. Most seats are given English names while six are recommended to be given Welsh names, namely:

- Ynys Môn ac Arfon
- Gogledd Clwyd a Gwynedd
- De Clwyd a Gogledd Sir Faldwyn
- Llanelli a Lliw
- Caerfyrddin
- Ceredigion a Gogledd Sir Benfro

=== Northern Ireland ===
Provisional recommendations were published by the Boundary Commission for Northern Ireland on 6 September 2016. While Belfast would lose one of its four seats, six new constituencies would be created, which have been provisionally called "Dalriada", "Glenshane", "North Tyrone", "Upper Bann and Blackwater", "West Antrim" and "West Down". The proposals would also split the town of Dungiven between three constituencies, a change which Órfhlaith Begley (MP for West Tyrone) has described as an "absurdity".

== Revised recommendations ==
Revised boundary proposals for Northern Ireland were published on 30 January 2018, following two consultation periods on the provisional recommendations. Belfast was restored to four proposed constituencies, while revisions elsewhere resulted in initially three (rather than six) new constituency names: "Causeway", "Mid Antrim" and "Mid Down". After further revisions, a fourth new constituency named "Sperrin" was later added in September. The Scottish commission opened up consultation for its revised recommendations between October and December 2017.

The Welsh commission published its revised proposals in October 2017, retaining their decision to give constituencies "dual" names in both English and Welsh. The English commission's revised proposals consultation closed in December 2017.

== Political and economic impact and controversy ==
The Parliamentary Constituencies (Amendment) Bill 2017–19, most recently debated in 2017, aimed to replace the Sixth Periodic Review with an entirely new process in time for the next general election. It was not given a third reading before the 2019 general election, which therefore used the existing boundaries.

== Patrick Lynch v. The Boundary Commissioner for Northern Ireland ==
In June 2020 the High Court of Justice in Northern Ireland ruled on appeal against the Boundary Commission for Northern Ireland for their decision-making during the sixth periodic review of Westminster constituencies, stating in part:

It is our view that the barriers unnecessarily erected by the Commission after the [Revised Proposals Report] to representations from members of the public as part of the statutory scheme of consultation subverted the process and unlawfully impugned the [Final Recommendations Report] and its final recommendations.

The court quashed the final report and sent it back to the commission for reconsideration, while noting that such reconsideration will not be needed once the review is abandoned.

== See also ==
- 2013 periodic review of Westminster constituencies
- 2023 review of Westminster constituencies
- Constituencies of the Parliament of the United Kingdom
