= Glasgow South =

UK Parliament constituency (since 2005)

Coordinates: 55°48′46″N 4°16′20″W

- Burgh constituency for the House of Commons
- Location of Glasgow South within Scotland
- Subdivision: Glasgow City
- Electorate: 71,344 (March 2020)
- Major settlements: Cathcart, Croftfoot, Crossmyloof, Langside, Mount Florida, Muirend, Pollokshaws

Current constituency
- Created: 2005
- Member of Parliament: Gordon McKee (Labour)
- Created from: Glasgow Cathcart; Glasgow Govan; Glasgow Rutherglen; Glasgow Pollok

Glasgow South is a burgh constituency of the House of Commons of the Parliament of the United Kingdom (Westminster). It elects one Member of Parliament (MP) by the first past the post system of election. The current Member of Parliament (MP) is Gordon McKee of the Labour Party who gained the seat from Scottish National Party's Stewart McDonald at the 2024 general election.

The constituency was first used in the 2005 general election, and is the successor to Glasgow Cathcart.

== Boundaries ==
Map of boundaries 2005-2024

Map of boundaries since 2024

=== 2005–2024 ===
Prior to the 2005 general election, the city area was covered by ten constituencies, of which two straddled boundaries with other council areas. The area of the South constituency was covered by the Glasgow Cathcart constituency and parts of the Glasgow Govan, Glasgow Rutherglen and Glasgow Pollok constituencies.

Under the Fifth Review of UK Parliament constituencies which came into effect for the 2005 general election, the boundaries were defined in accordance with the ward structure in place on 30 November 2004 as containing the Glasgow City Council wards of Battlefield, Carmunnock, Carnwadric, Castlemilk, Cathcart, Glenwood, King's Park, Langside, Maxwell Park, Mount Florida, Newlands, and Pollokshaws. Further to reviews of local government ward boundaries which came into effect in 2007 and 2017, but did not affect the parliamentary boundaries, the constituency comprised the City of Glasgow Council wards or part wards of: Linn, Newlands/Auldburn (most), Pollokshields (minority), Langside (most) and Southside Central (small part).

=== 2024–present ===
Further to the 2023 review of Westminster constituencies which came into effect for the 2024 general election, there were minor changes to the constituency boundaries, including the transfer of the Pollokshields area to Glasgow South West, offset by the addition of the Toryglen district and a small area to the north of Queen's Park from the abolished constituency of Glasgow Central.

The constituency currently consists of the following wards or part wards of the City of Glasgow:

- The whole of Linn ward;
- the bulk of Newlands/Auldburn ward - excluding a small area in the south (Arden housing estate);
- a minority of Pollokshields ward, comprising the area to the south of the railway line between Pollokshaws West, Crossmyloof and Rutherglen stations;
- the whole of Langside ward; and
- a small part of Southside Central ward, comprising the small area to the north of Queen's Park.

Glasgow South is one of six constituencies covering the Glasgow City council area. All are entirely within the council area. Scottish Parliament constituencies retain the names and boundaries of the older Westminster constituencies.

== Constituency profile ==
While this constituency includes some of Glasgow's few Conservative-voting areas such as Pollokshields and Newlands, other areas such as Langside and Shawlands are SNP, with Labour in second place and the Conservatives far behind. While deprived housing estates typify parts of this constituency, there are still many more affluent residential areas. There is a large Asian community and Scotland's second-largest Jewish community is based around Pollokshields (the largest being in the neighbouring East Renfrewshire constituency). Around one-third of the residents in this constituency are Roman Catholics.

== Members of Parliament ==
Election	Member	Party	Notes
2005	Tom Harris	Labour	Previously MP for Glasgow Cathcart
2015	Stewart McDonald	SNP	
2024	Gordon McKee	Labour	

== Election results ==
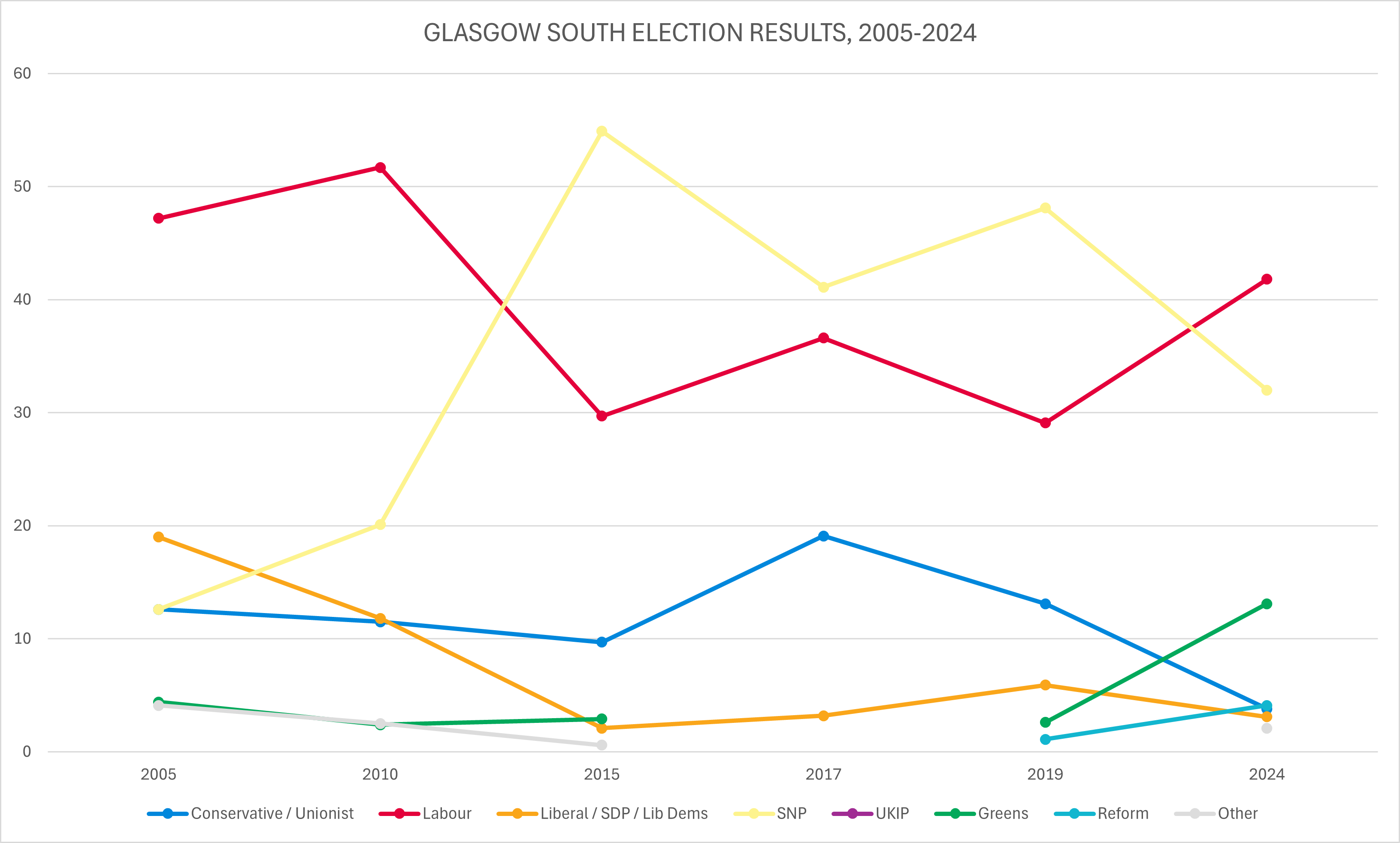
Election results 2005-2024

=== Elections in the 2020s ===
General election 2024: Glasgow South
Party	Candidate	Votes	%	±%
Labour	Gordon McKee	17,696	41.8	+12.3
SNP	Stewart McDonald	13,542	32.0	−16.3
Green	Niall Christie	5,554	13.1	+10.5
Reform	Danny Raja	1,736	4.1	+3.2
Conservative	Haroun Malik	1,617	3.8	−8.9
Liberal Democrats	Peter McLaughlin	1,316	3.1	−2.9
TUSC	Brian Smith	473	1.1	New
Alba	Dhruva Kumar	444	1.0	New
Majority		4,154	9.8	N/A
Turnout		42,378	60.6	−7.6
Registered electors		70,219		
Labour gain from SNP		Swing	+14.3	

=== Elections in the 2010s ===
2019 notional result (Note: Estimate of the 2019 general election result as if the revised boundaries recommended under the 2023 boundary review were in place)
Party	Vote	%
SNP	23,449	48.3
Labour	14,298	29.5
Conservative	6,161	12.7
Liberal Democrats	2,922	6.0
Scottish Greens	1,266	2.6
Brexit Party	452	0.9
Majority	9,151	18.8
Turnout	48,548	68.0
Electorate	71,344	

General election 2019: Glasgow South
Party	Candidate	Votes	%	±%
SNP	Stewart McDonald	22,829	48.1	+7.0
Labour Co-op	Johann Lamont	13,824	29.1	−7.5
Conservative	Kyle Thornton	6,237	13.1	−6.0
Liberal Democrats	Carole Ford	2,786	5.9	+2.7
Green	Dan Hutchison	1,251	2.6	New
Brexit Party	Danyaal Raja	516	1.1	New
Majority		9,005	19.0	+14.5
Turnout		47,343	66.9	+2.5
SNP hold		Swing	+7.2	

General election 2017: Glasgow South
Party	Candidate	Votes	%	±%
SNP	Stewart McDonald	18,312	41.1	−13.8
Labour	Eileen Dinning	16,285	36.6	+6.9
Conservative	Taylor Muir	8,506	19.1	+9.4
Liberal Democrats	Ewan Hoyle	1,447	3.2	+1.1
Majority		2,027	4.5	−20.7
Turnout		44,550	64.4	−1.5
SNP hold		Swing	−10.3	

General election 2015: Glasgow South
Party	Candidate	Votes	%	±%
SNP	Stewart McDonald	26,773	54.9	+34.8
Labour	Tom Harris	14,504	29.7	−22.0
Conservative	Kyle Thornton	4,752	9.7	−1.8
Green	Alastair Whitelaw	1,431	2.9	+0.5
Liberal Democrats	Ewan Hoyle	1,019	2.1	−9.7
TUSC	Brian Smith	299	0.6	−0.3
Majority		12,269	25.2	N/A
Turnout		48,778	65.9	+4.2
SNP gain from Labour		Swing	+28.3	

General election 2010: Glasgow South
Party	Candidate	Votes	%	±%
Labour	Tom Harris	20,736	51.7	+4.5
SNP	Malcolm Fleming	8,078	20.1	+7.5
Liberal Democrats	Shabnum Mustapha	4,739	11.8	−7.2
Conservative	Davena Rankin	4,592	11.5	−1.1
Green	Marie Campbell	961	2.4	−2.0
BNP	Michael Coyle	637	1.6	New
TUSC	Brian Smith	351	0.9	New
Majority		12,658	31.6	+3.4
Turnout		40,094	61.7	+5.9
Labour hold		Swing		

=== Elections in the 2000s ===
General election 2005: Glasgow South
Party	Candidate	Votes	%	±%
Labour	Tom Harris	18,153	47.2	−3.3
Liberal Democrats	Arthur Sanderson	7,321	19.0	+6.6
SNP	Finlay MacLean	4,860	12.6	−4.7
Conservative	Janette McAlpine	4,836	12.6	−1.2
Green	Kay Allan	1,692	4.4	New
Scottish Socialist	Ronnie Stevenson	1,303	3.4	−2.4
Socialist Labour	Dorothy Entwistle	266	0.7	New
Majority		10,832	28.2	
Turnout		38,431	55.8	
Labour win (new seat)				

== See also ==
- Politics of Glasgow
