= Tom Harris (British politician) =

British politician and former MP

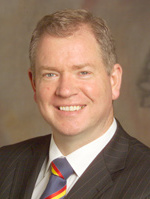
- Harris as a government minister

Shadow Minister for the Environment
- In office 15 May 2012 – 12 June 2013
- Leader: Ed Miliband
- Preceded by: Fiona O'Donnell
- Succeeded by: Barry Gardiner

Parliamentary Under-Secretary of State for Transport
- In office 7 September 2006 – 4 October 2008
- Prime Minister: Tony Blair; Gordon Brown
- Preceded by: Jim Fitzpatrick
- Succeeded by: Paul Clark

Member of Parliament for Glasgow South Glasgow Cathcart (2001–2005)
- In office 7 June 2001 – 30 March 2015
- Preceded by: John Maxton
- Succeeded by: Stewart McDonald

Personal details
- Born: Thomas Harris; 20 February 1964 (age 62) Ayrshire, Scotland
- Party: Independent (since 2018)
- Other political affiliations: Labour (1984–2018)
- Spouse: Carolyn Moffat
- Children: 3
- Education: Napier University
- Occupation: Former politician, journalist, and press officer

Thomas Harris (born 20 February 1964) is a Scottish journalist and former politician who served as Member of Parliament (MP) for Glasgow South, formerly Glasgow Cathcart, from 2001 to 2015. A former member of Scottish Labour, he left the party in August 2018.

Harris first entered government when he was made a Parliamentary Under-Secretary of State at the Department for Transport in September 2006 by PM Tony Blair. When Gordon Brown took over as Prime Minister in June 2007, Harris kept his junior ministerial role but, in the October 2008 reshuffle, he was sacked and returned to the backbenches. On 9 June 2009, he was the first Scottish Labour MP to call for Gordon Brown to stand down as prime minister.

Harris was a candidate in the 2011 Scottish Labour leadership election, but effectively admitted defeat on 10 December a week before the result was declared. In 2012, he returned to Ed Miliband's frontbench as shadow environment minister but left in June 2013 to spend more time with his family, being succeeded by Barry Gardiner.

== Early life and career ==
Tom Harris was born in Ayrshire and raised in Beith, Scotland. He was educated at the Garnock Academy in Kilbirnie and Napier College, Edinburgh, where he was awarded an HND in Journalism in 1986. He worked as a trainee newspaper journalist with the East Kilbride News in 1986 before joining the Paisley Daily Express in 1988.

He was appointed as a press officer with the Scottish Labour Party in 1990, moving to the same position with Strathclyde Regional Council in 1992. He was briefly the senior media officer with the Glasgow City Council in 1996 before joining East Ayrshire Council later in the same year as a public relations manager. In 1998, he became the chief of public relations at the Strathclyde Passenger Executive, where he remained until his election to the Parliament of the United Kingdom.

Harris joined the Labour Party in 1984. He was active in the Edinburgh South Constituency Labour Party and was elected as the chairman of the Glasgow Cathcart Constituency Labour Party for two years in 1998. During his time at this post, he tried to stop the closure of the ABC Muirend/Toledo cinema, but was unsuccessful.

== Parliamentary career ==
Harris was elected to the House of Commons at the 2001 general election for the seat of Glasgow Cathcart following the retirement of the Labour MP John Maxton. He held the seat with a majority of 10,816 and made his maiden speech on 27 June 2001. His seat was abolished following the creation of the Scottish Parliament at Holyrood and the subsequent reduction of Scottish seats at Westminster. He represented the new seat of Glasgow South from the 2005 general election until losing in 2015.

He served on the Science and Technology Select Committee for two years from 2001, and was appointed in 2003 as the Parliamentary Private Secretary (PPS) to the Minister of State for Northern Ireland, John Spellar. From 2005, he was PPS to the Secretary of State for Health Patricia Hewitt. On 7 September 2006, he replaced Derek Twigg as Parliamentary Under Secretary at the Department for Transport. However, in October 2008 Harris announced on his blog that the Prime Minister had telephoned him to inform him that he would be returning to the back benches.

He is a committed trade unionist and was a member of the National Union of Journalists from 1984 until he joined UNISON in 1997, and has since a member of Unite the Union. He introduced a bill in 2005 for tougher sentences for e-criminals. Also in 2005, he was involved in an argument over the funding of a housing charity which had called for direct action following the eviction and deportation to Albania of a Kosovan family seeking asylum from a flat in Drumchapel. He was a keen supporter of John Smith and is reported to have been more of a Blairite than a Brownite. He wrote a popular blog from 2007 to 2010, which has won a number of awards and in 2011 published a book containing excerpts from it, entitled "Why I'm Right and Everyone Else Is Wrong". In the 2009, Top Political Blog Awards run by Total Politics magazine, it was voted top MP's blog, top Scottish blog and top left-of-centre blog, and was ranked number 8 overall. He is a member of Labour Friends of Israel.

On 6 December 2010, he appeared on the BBC Radio 4 Today programme to criticise protesters who had intimidated ordinary shoppers using Topshop and Vodafone in the run-up to Christmas and suggested that corporate tax avoidance could be prevented by a change in tax regulations. In 2011, he actively campaigned against the Alternative Vote in the referendum that year.

Harris was forced to stand down from his role as Scottish Labour's internet adviser on 16 January 2012, following adverse media reaction to his posting of a Downfall parody on YouTube ridiculing First Minister Alex Salmond.

In August 2011 Harris expressed an interest, and in September 2011 confirmed on Twitter he was standing in the election to be the next leader of the Scottish Labour Party, after the publication of the Murphy and Boyack review. He described the Scottish Labour Party as having had "no new ideas in 12 years [of devolution]", and that it must become a "party of aspiration" or it risked becoming irrelevant in the next few years. Harris was the only MP to enter the race and said Labour had become "too closely associated with the public sector", rather than being "a party of business". He also said the "Scottish Labour party was really in deep trouble and that we need to think outside the box. There is no indication that the party is prepared to do that yet and I don't know why".

Harris considered standing in the 2016 Scottish Parliament election, but announced via his podcast in May 2012 that he had given up this ambition and was committed to stand in his Glasgow South constituency at the United Kingdom general election of 2015. In 2015, he lost his seat to Stewart McDonald of the SNP.

== Post-Parliament career ==
Since losing his seat, Harris has set up a public affairs company called Third Avenue Public Affairs Ltd and, as of 2019, is senior counsel for the Edinburgh-based media and political relations consultancy Message Matters. He is also an associate consultant with Peterborough-based public affairs company Cogitamus Ltd. In March 2016, he replaced Dan Hodges as a daily commentator for The Daily Telegraph.

The same month, Harris became the new director of the Scottish branch of Vote Leave, the campaign for Britain to leave the EU. Although a Eurosceptic, Harris said he had originally intended to vote to stay in; however, he found David Cameron's renegotiation of Britain's membership unsatisfactory, denouncing it as, "a few minor changes of emphasis on the fringes of EU policy" and decided to vote to leave. Harris has continued to speak out in favour of Brexit in his newspaper columns since 2016.

In 2016, Harris was a member of the advisory board of the Reform Scotland think tank, and declared himself a "self-confessed Blairite".

In March 2018, Ten Years In The Death of the Labour Party, written by Harris, was published by Biteback. In August, he announced his resignation from the Labour Party in an op-ed for The Daily Telegraph. In November 2019, he announced he would be voting for the Conservatives at the 2019 general election. Harris further admitted on the edition of 29 July 2020 of the Iain Dale All Talk podcast that this was not the first time he had voted Conservative, having done so two years earlier as well.

In October 2018, Harris was appointed to the Expert Challenge Panel, supporting Keith Williams in his wide-ranging review of the British railway industry. As of July 2020, the review has yet to be published. In July 2020, Harris was appointed as a Non-Executive Director of HS2 Ltd.

On 20 October 2021, Harris took on a job for three years as an adviser to the Conservative government on Scottish issues, as lead non-executive director of both the Office of the Secretary of State for Scotland and Advocate General for Scotland. He said: "I'm delighted to have been appointed to this role and I'm looking forward to contributing to the effective work of the UK Government in Scotland. This is an exciting time to be involved in advising and helping ministers deliver for the whole country."

== Personal life ==
Harris married Carolyn Moffat in 1998; the couple have two sons. He has another son from an earlier marriage, which was dissolved in 1996. A Christian, he enjoys astronomy and badminton. Harris is a fan of Doctor Who and is friends with its former showrunner, Steven Moffat. Harris contributed to Behind The Sofa, the collection of celebrity Doctor Who fan memories published by Gollancz in 2013. He firmly opposed a female actor playing the Doctor. In 2019, he launched a Doctor Who podcast, The Power of 3, alongside fellow fans Kenny Smith and David Steel.

Parliament of the United Kingdom
Preceded by John Maxton	Member of Parliament for Glasgow Cathcart; 2001–2005	Constituency abolished
New constituency	Member of Parliament for Glasgow South; 2005–2015	Succeeded by Stewart McDonald
Political offices
Preceded by Jim Fitzpatrick	Parliamentary Under-Secretary of State at the Department for Transport; 2006–2008	Succeeded by Paul Clark
