= Parliamentary Standards Act 2009 =

Act of the Parliament of the United Kingdom

Parliamentary Standards Act 2009 (Note: Section 14(1).)
- Act of Parliament
- Parliament of the United Kingdom
- Long title: An Act to make provision establishing a body corporate known as the Independent Parliamentary Standards Authority and an officer known as the Commissioner for Parliamentary Investigations; to make provision relating to salaries and allowances for members of the House of Commons and to their financial interests and conduct; and for connected purposes.
- Citation: 2009 c. 13
- Introduced by: Harriet Harman MP, Leader of the House of Commons (Commons); Baroness Royall of Blaisdon, Chancellor of the Duchy of Lancaster (Lords)
- Territorial extent: United Kingdom

Dates
- Royal assent: 21 July 2009
- Commencement: Sections 12-15 on 21 July; remaining sections on a day to be appointed by a minister
Other legislation
| Amended by | Constitutional Reform and Governance Act 2010; Sentencing Act 2020 |

Status: Amended

History of passage through Parliament

Text of statute as originally enacted

Revised text of statute as amended

The Parliamentary Standards Act 2009 (c. 13) is an act of the Parliament of the United Kingdom that entered into force in part on 21 July 2009, largely as a response to the Parliamentary expenses scandal. The Act was considered urgent by the government and therefore progressed through Parliament in less than one month.

== Legislative passage ==
During the passage of the bill a clause which would have allowed words used by MPs in parliament, and also by committee witnesses and officials, to be employed in criminal courts. A clause creating a statutory code of conduct was also dropped.

== Provisions ==
The main provision of the act was to create the Independent Parliamentary Standards Authority (IPSA), which would assume responsibility for the management of expenses and maintaining the Register of Members' Interests, largely as a result of the abolition of the Fees Office, which had attracted criticism over its role in the aforementioned scandal. The Act also created the office of the Commissioner of Parliamentary Investigations, who would, as part of the IPSA, oversee any investigations into MPs who he believed, or had reason to believe, had been paid an expenses claim that was not within the rules as set out in the Act and by the House of Commons, or the investigation of any MP who had failed to comply with the IPSA's code of conduct relating to financial interests. The government had attempted to legislate, as part of the original bill, that parliamentary privilege could not be used to prevent the IPSA from carrying out investigations against Members of Parliament, however this clause was voted down in the House of Commons by 250-247.

The act also creates a criminal offence of providing false or misleading information for allowances claims, punishable by a fine and/or up to 12 months imprisonment.
