= Independent Parliamentary Standards Authority =

UK Parliament expenses oversight body

Agency overview
- Formed: 2009
- Jurisdiction: United Kingdom
- Headquarters: Ivybridge House
- Employees: 100
- Agency executives: Richard Lloyd, Chair; Karen Walker, Chief Executive
- Website: theipsa.org.uk

The Independent Parliamentary Standards Authority (IPSA) is a public body in the United Kingdom created by the Parliamentary Standards Act 2009, largely as a response to the parliamentary expenses scandal of 2009.

It establishes and monitors the expenses scheme for Members of the House of Commons, and is responsible for paying their salaries and expenses. Following revisions to the Parliamentary Standards Act in April 2010 (via the Constitutional Reform and Governance Act 2010), IPSA was also given responsibility for setting the level of MPs' salaries.

== Role ==
IPSA is responsible for: setting the level of and paying MPs' annual salaries; paying the salaries of MPs' staff; drawing up, reviewing, and administering an MPs' allowances scheme; providing MPs with publicly available information relating to taxation issues; and determining the procedures for investigations and complaints relating to MPs.

Upon its formation IPSA took over some of the functions previously undertaken by the House of Commons Fees Office, as well as some of the staff who previously carried out these functions.

== Consultation ==
IPSA is required by statute to consult with certain bodies when setting the expenses scheme. In addition to consulting with this group, IPSA invited the public to respond to the consultation. The consultation was open from 4 January until 11 February 2010.

In June 2010 IPSA launched three further consultations, on amendments to the expenses scheme; proposals on publication; and on the compliance officer's processes.

== Report of the Committee on Standards in Public Life ==
Christopher Kelly, the Chairman of the Committee on Standards in Public Life, published a report on 4 November 2009 looking at MPs' expenses. His report had no formal powers, but provided recommendations to IPSA, and was used to inform the final allowances scheme prepared by IPSA.

== Publication of first expenses scheme ==
IPSA published their first expenses scheme on 29 March 2010. It had a largely positive reaction from MPs, the media, and the general public, although there was some criticism of the continued ability of MPs to employ one family member.

== MPs' salaries ==
Before the formation of IPSA, MPs were able to determine their own salaries and expenses. Following the 2009 parliamentary expenses scandal, this role was taken from politicians and given to IPSA. In July 2015, IPSA announced that MPs' salaries would be increased from £67,000 to £74,000. They stated this "one-off adjustment" was needed to correct disparities between MPs and the rest of the public sector in terms of pay and pensions which they felt was the result of successive governments' reluctance to tackle the contentious issue. IPSA also commented that further pay rises would be linked to the average earnings in the public sector. Then Prime Minister David Cameron publicly criticized the move, saying "I don't think this was the right decision", having previously criticized such a move as "simply unacceptable", given the rest of public sector pay had been capped for the duration of the parliament. Cameron, however, defended MPs accepting the rise, assuring them "the right thing to do is to be paid the rate for the job". The 10% pay rise was controversial as the rest of the public sector pay had been capped at 1% per year.

Some MPs stated that they would not accept the pay rise but instead transfer it to charities. IPSA announced further pay rises of 1.3% and 1.4% to MPs' salaries in line with average earnings within the public sector as determined by the Office for National Statistics in 2016 and 2017 respectively.

In March 2017, IPSA had to apologise to MPs after accidentally publishing information about MPs' staff and their salaries on the internet.

== Criticism ==
IPSA has been criticised publicly by many MPs, including David Cameron, who, in 2010, told IPSA to "...get a grip on what they are doing and do it fast.". Criticism has been largely centred on the perceived high running costs of IPSA, inability of MPs to get through on the IPSA helpline, emails and letters going largely unanswered, and the length of time taken to reimburse expenses.

== Governance of IPSA ==
- IPSA Chair: Richard Lloyd
- IPSA Chief Executive: Karen Walker
- IPSA Board members: Helen Jones, Richard Lloyd, Will Lifford, Lea Paterson, Laura Cox
- Former IPSA Board members: Ian Todd, Sir Robert Owen, Ruth Evans, Jackie Smith, Elizabeth Padmore, Anne Whittaker, Professor Sir Ian Kennedy, John Thurso, Sir Neil Butterfield, Tony Wright, Scott Baker, Ken Olisa, Jackie Ballard, Professor Isobel Sharp.

== See also ==
- Parliamentary Commissioner for Standards
- Standards and Privileges Committee
- Parliamentary expenses scandal
- Parliamentary Standards Act 2009
- Speaker's Committee for the Independent Parliamentary Standards Authority
