= Newlands/Auldburn (ward) =

Electoral ward in Glasgow, Scotland

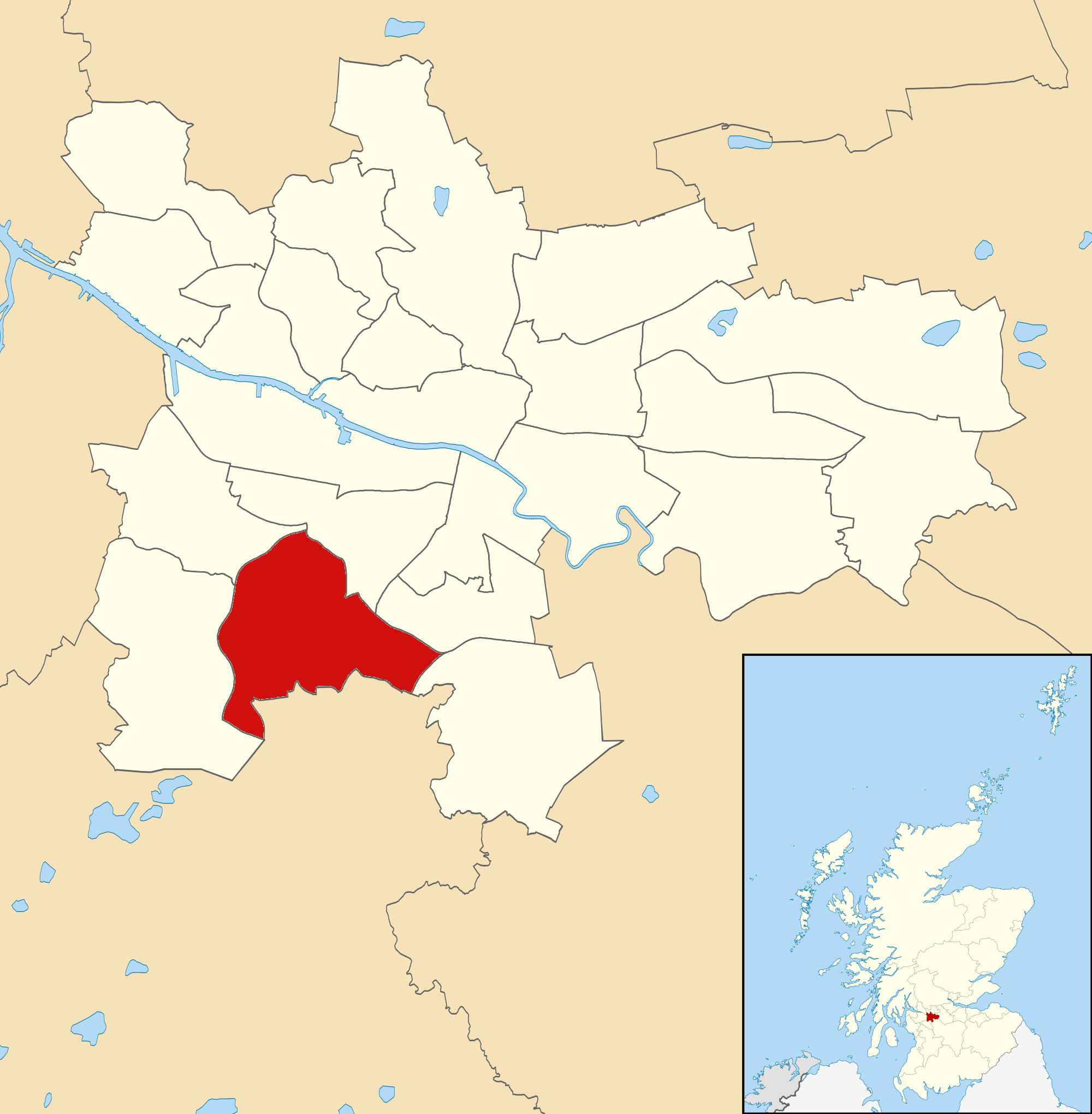
- Newlands/Auldburn Ward (2017) within Glasgow

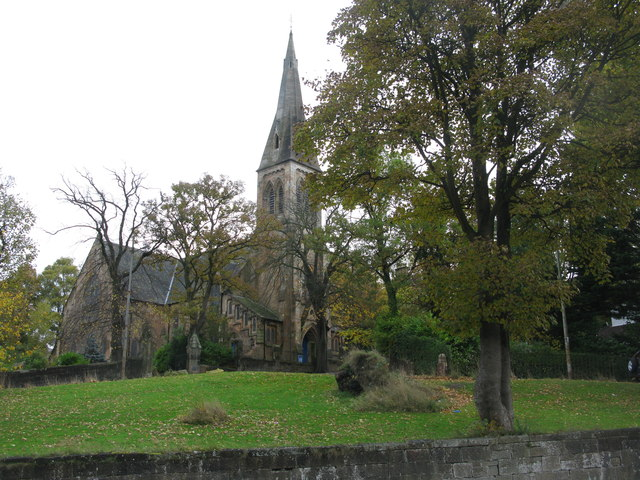
- Eastwood Parish Church, within the Newlands/Auldburn ward
- Area: 9.93 km^{2} (3.83 sq mi)
- Population: 23,144
  - Density: 2,330.7/km^{2} (6,036/sq mi)
- Council area: Glasgow City Council
- Lieutenancy area: Glasgow
- Country: Scotland
- Sovereign state: United Kingdom
- Post town: GLASGOW
- Postcode district: G41, G43, G44, G46
- Dialling code: 0141
- Police: Scotland
- Fire: Scottish
- Ambulance: Scottish

Newlands/Auldburn (Ward 2) is one of the 23 wards of Glasgow City Council. Situated south of the city and the River Clyde, it is represented by 3 members as of May 2022, one each from the Scottish National Party, Scottish Labour, and Scottish Green Party.

== Boundaries and demographics ==
The ward covers the areas of Pollokshaws, Newlands, Hillpark, Auldhouse, Merrylee, Cowglen, Kennishead, Eastwood, Mansewood, Carnwadric, Arden and the western part of Muirend, as well as Pollok Country Park. It is bordered to the east by Pollokshaws East, Langside and Muirend railway stations, with Pollokshaws West and Kennishead stations running through the centre.

A 2017 boundary change resulted in the gain of Arden from the Greater Pollok ward, and a minor loss of a few streets in Cathcart to the Langside ward when the boundary was moved south from the White Cart Water to the Cathcart Circle Line railway.

According to the 2011 census, the ethnicity of the population is:

Ethnicity	Proportion
White Scottish/British	79.92%
White Irish	1.73%
Other White	4.59%
Mixed Ethnic Groups	0.56%
Indian	1.27%
Pakistani	6.49%
Bangladeshi	0.03%
Chinese	0.88%
Other Asian	1.04%
African	2.62%
Caribbean or Black	0.36%
Other Ethnic Group	0.52%

== Councillors ==
Election	Councillors		
2007	Stephen Curran (Labour)	Jim McNally (Labour)	Colin Deans (SNP)
2012	Stephen Curran (Labour)	Emma Gillan (Labour)	Josephine Docherty (SNP)
2017	Stephen Curran (Labour)	Kyle Thornton (Conservative)	Josephine Docherty (SNP)
2022	Stephen Curran (Labour)	Leòdhas Iain Massie (Green)	Sean Ferguson (SNP)

== Election results ==
=== 2022 Election ===
2022 Glasgow City Council election

Newlands/Auldburn – 3 seats
Party	Candidate	FPv%	Count									
Party	Candidate	FPv%	1	2	3	4	5	6	7	8	9	10
SNP	Sean Ferguson	27.4	2,074									
Labour	Stephan Curran (incumbent)	25.5	1,928									
Conservative	Kim Schmulian	11.3	857	858	859	864	868	896	904	986	1,330	
Independent	Craig Ross	9.0	682	686	687	697	713	736	774	868		
Green	Leòdhas Iain Massie	8.4	638	664	665	689	701	741	1,004	1,213	1,369	1,509
Labour	Linda Devlin	7.3	554	563	591	606	627	682	762			
SNP	Rage Rage	5.7	428	555	556	564	618	627				
Liberal Democrats	Hugh Southall	2.3	175	177	178	181	187					
Alba	Ralph Raja Suleman	1.9	147	149	149	157						
TUSC	Jeannie Robertson	1.1	82	84	84							
Electorate: 18,963 Valid: 7,565 Spoilt: 214 Quota: 1,892 Turnout: 41.0%

=== 2017 Election ===
2017 Glasgow City Council election

Newlands/Auldburn- 3 seats
Party	Candidate	FPv%	Count						
Party	Candidate	FPv%	1	2	3	4	5	6	7
SNP	Josephine Docherty (incumbent)	25.87%	1,879						
Labour Co-op	Stephan Curran (incumbent)	23.46%	1,704	1,708	1,776	2,043			
Conservative	Kyle Thornton	21.97%	1,596	1,597	1,646	1,669	1,709	1,775	2,158
SNP	Gavin Williamson	14.21%	1,032	1,079	1,094	1,111	1,138	1,409	
Green	Charles Gay	5.81%	422	427	500	525	569		
Labour Co-op	Fay Graham	5.11%	371	373	391				
Liberal Democrats	Rebecca Coleman-Bennett	3.57%	259	260					
Electorate: 17,775 Valid: 7,263 Spoilt: 251 Quota: 1,816 Turnout: 42.3%

=== 2012 Election ===
2012 Glasgow City Council election

Newlands/Auldburn – 3 seats
Party	Candidate	FPv%	Count										
Party	Candidate	FPv%	1	2	3	4	5	6	7	8	9	10	11
Labour	Stephan Curran (incumbent)	26.03%	1,750										
SNP	Josephine Docherty	21.17%	1,423	1,426	1,431	1,440	1,446	1,460	1,515	1,595	1,699		
Labour	Emma Gillan	14.95%	1,005	1,058	1,062	1,071	1,076	1,085	1,147	1,233	1,360	1,361	1,506
SNP	Shoaib Gul	14.94%	1,004	1,005	1,006	1,008	1,009	1,010	1,042	1,068	1,097	1,110	
Conservative	Robert McElroy	10.77%	724	725	728	730	734	757	771	841			
Independent	Colin Deans (incumbent)	4.63%	311	314	319	324	362	372	422				
Green	Ben Thomson	3.61%	243	243	256	269	282	318					
Liberal Democrats	Michael O'Donnell	1.56%	105	105	105	105	107						
Independent	Craig Creighton	1.06%	71	71	74	82							
Glasgow First	Ruth Black (Note: Outgoing councillor from Craigton ward.)	0.71%	48	48	50								
TUSC	Diane Harvey	0.57%	38	38									
Electorate: 17,755 Valid: 6,722 Spoilt: 201 Quota: 1,681 Turnout: 38.98%

=== 2007 Election ===
2007 Glasgow City Council election

2007 Council election: Newlands/Auldburn (3 members)
Party	Candidate	FPv%	Count						
Party	Candidate	FPv%	1	2	3	4	5	6	7
SNP	Colin Deans††	24.28	2,101	2,133	2,178				
Labour	Stephen Curran (Note: Outgoing councillor for Pollokshaws single-member ward.)	21.45	1,856	1,873	1,894	1,895	1,939	1,980	2,156
Labour	Jim McNally (Note: Outgoing councillor for Newlands single-member ward.)	17.04	1,475	1,487	1,493	1,494	1,557	1,660	1,800
Conservative	Robert McElroy	15.51	1,342	1,345	1,390	1,391	1,407	1,522	1,625
Green	Kay Allan	6.69	579	602	619	621	716	894	
Liberal Democrats	Robert W Stewart	6.48	561	570	577	578	617		
Solidarity	Gordon Morgan	4.13	357	388	403	404			
BNP	Charlie Baillie	2.44	211	217					
Scottish Socialist	Eamonn Coyle	1.99	172						
Electorate: 17,582 Valid: 8,654 Spoilt: 170 Quota: 2,164 Turnout: 50.19%

== See also ==
- Wards of Glasgow
