= William Beresford Inglis =

Scottish architect (?–1967)

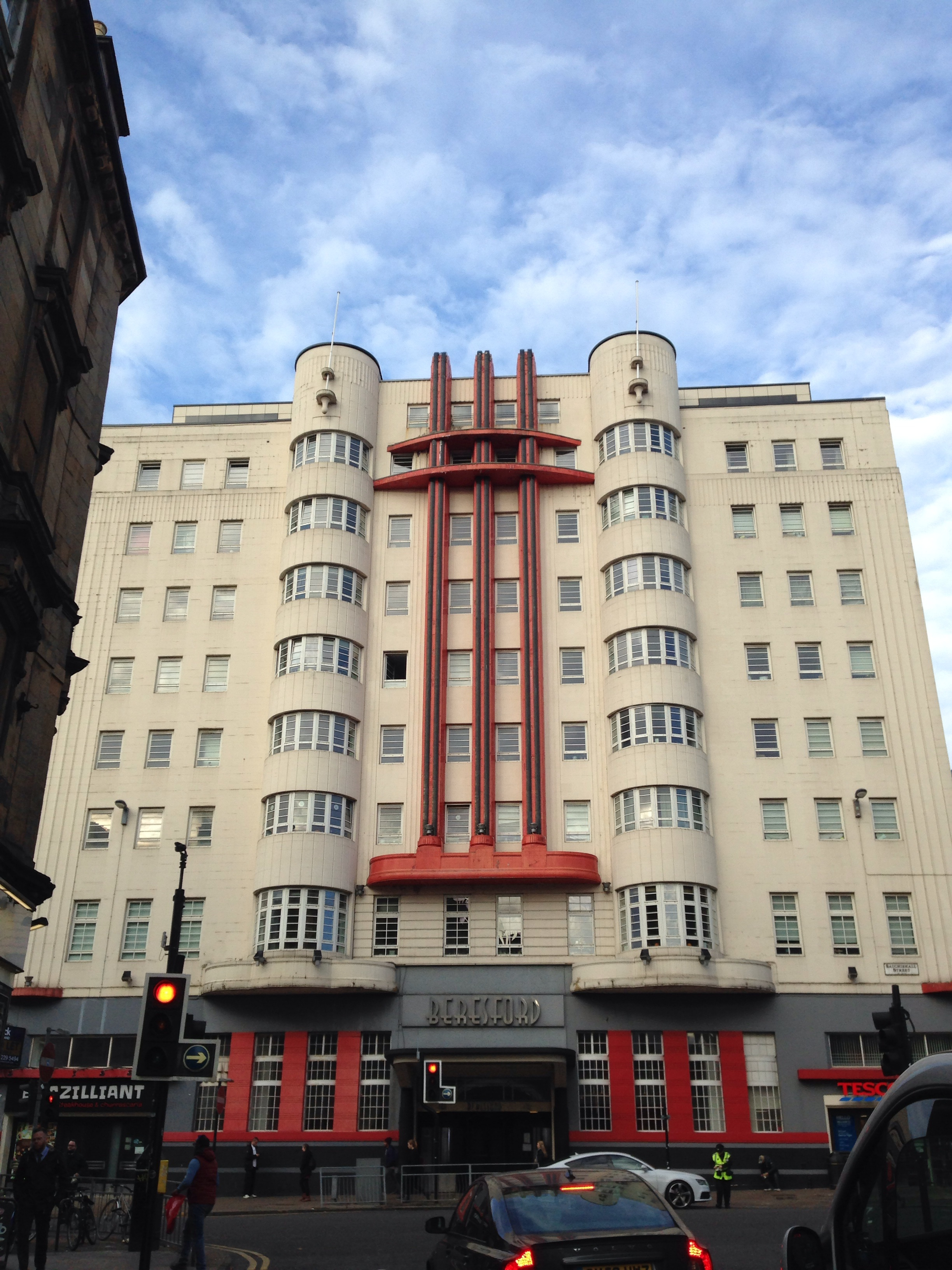
The former Beresford Hotel, Sauchiehall Street, Glasgow

William Beresford Inglis (died 1967) was a Scottish architect. He came from a large family with 6 siblings. His office was in Blythswood Square in Glasgow near his most important work, the Beresford Hotel on Sauchiehall Street (restored in 2003 as residential apartments). He also built 4 cinemas in Glasgow; The Toledo in Muirend, the Boulevard (later renamed Vogue) in Knightswood and the Hippodrome in Oatlands. He was helped in this operation by his eldest daughter Margaret Helen Scott Inglis. He died in 1967 in Keighley, Yorkshire.

He married three times. His first wife died on Arran during a family holiday, and his second wife divorced him and emigrated to New Zealand with the couple's two daughters.
