= Locarno Ballrooms =

British chain of ballrooms

Coordinates: 55°51′59″N 4°16′08″W

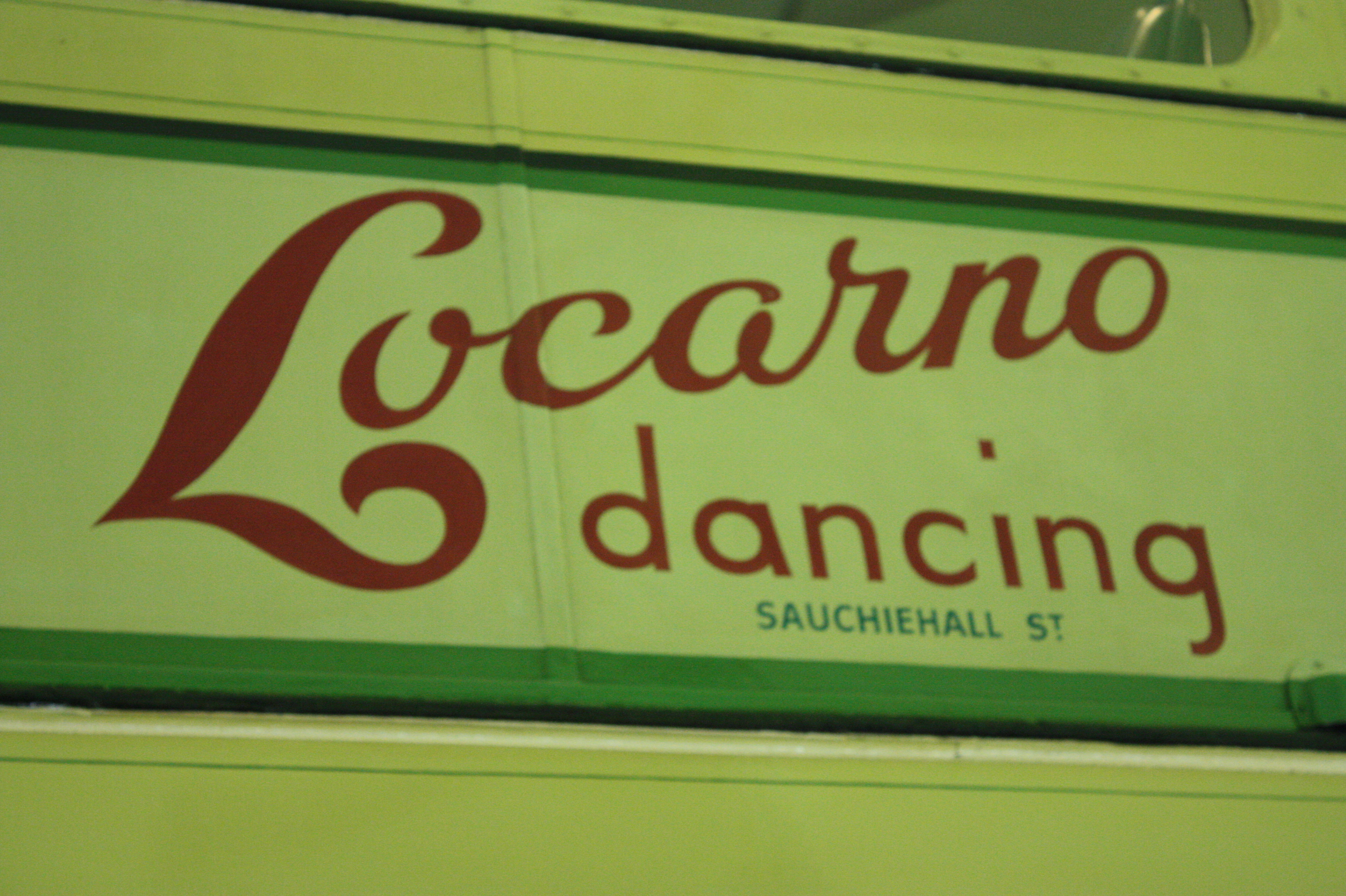
Advert for Locarno on the side of a Glasgow tram, Glasgow Transport Museum

Locarno Ballrooms were a series of large public ballrooms located in England and Scotland and were represented in most major British cities.

== History ==
The company was created in 1926 and named after the Locarno Treaties of 1925 which offered a new hope and spirit in post-war Europe (created in Locarno in Switzerland). Given the company's development pattern it was presumably Scots-owned.

Many earlier buildings were adaptations of cinemas, which despite the growing success of cinemas were generally over-provided. The demand in these pre-sound days was for smaller and more widely distributed cinemas and some of the bigger venues struggled. The smaller cinemas were in turn hit by the advent of sound films, and many did not survive this expensive transition.

The first Locarno was created in 1926 on Sauchiehall Street in Glasgow, in the shell of the Charing Cross Electric Theatre, Glasgow's first purpose built cinema. This was designed by Robert Duncan in 1898 with a cast iron structure but with a traditional stone frontage with high numbers of large windows (certainly more glazing than a typical cinema of the day). The original full title was the "Locarno Palais de Dance". Functionally the buildings focussed on what would now be called ballroom dancing and the locations provided both professional displays plus instruction classes. The Glasgow venue was home to Scotland's first Scottish Professional Dancing Championships in 1928.

Teenagers and adults were patrons every night, especially on weekends. Children-only dancing occurred on Saturday mornings, supervised by nurses, while mothers shopped. The chain and brand name was mainly acquired by Mecca Leisure Group in the mid-1960s but they retained the much-loved name Locarno in most locations. Under Mecca many also gained a function as a performance venue. Several venues were particularly associated with Northern Soul.

Sadly most venues were closed prior to the revival of ballroom dancing in the UK with the beginning of Strictly Come Dancing in 2004, which potentially could have breathed new life into the venues. The main presenter Len Goodman learnt his craft in the Streatham Locarno.

The first Locarno, that on Sauchiehall Street in Glasgow, still exists: both in its external form and as the main auditorium of The Garage, Glasgow, Scotland's biggest nightclub. The building is a category B listed building due to its architectural and cultural significance (LB33197).

== Locations ==
- Glasgow (1926) renamed Tiffany's in 1971 when use changed to a discotheque. the building still survives at 508 Sauchiehall St and forms part of The Garage, Glasgow
- Dundee (1927?) closed 1951
- Streatham (1929) renamed 1970 as the Cat's Whiskers, demolished 2004
- Montrose (c. 1930) closed 1950s
- Aberdeen (acquired and rebranded Locarno c. 1932) closed 1955 demolished 1979
- Edinburgh (1934) snooker halls only
- Leeds (1938)
- Liverpool (1948)
- Swindon (1952) ceased operating as a concert venue in 1970, carried on as a bingo hall until 1986.
- Coventry (1960) renamed Tiffany's in the late 1960s, closed 1981
- Sunderland (c. 1960) major gig venue
- Birmingham (1961)
- Basildon (1961)
- Burnley (1962) Rebranded as the Cat's Whiskers in 1973 until the early 1990's, evolving into the Ritzy nightclub and now a bingo hall.
- Bristol (1966) mainly as a gig venue, closed 1983 reopened as O2 Academy Bristol

== In popular culture ==
In 1966, American R&B duo Ike & Tina Turner performed at the Locarno Ballroom in Coventry.

Several Locarnos were the siting of "Come Dancing" in the 1960s and 70s.

The Coventry band The Specials refer to their local Locarno in their hit "Friday Night and Saturday Morning" (also covered by the French band Nouvelle Vague).

In Dundee, the site of the Locarno is remembered with the street named Locarno Close.
