= Charing Cross Electric Theatre =

Former cinema in Glasgow, Scotland, UK

Coordinates: 55.8655°N 4.2643°W

The Charing Cross Electric Theare was a cinema in Glasgow, Scotland. It was opened in 1910 on Sauchiehall Street in the centre of Glasgow. Although not the first building used for cinema in Glasgow, it was the first purpose-built cinema in the city. The cinema was operated by West of Scotland Electric Theatres. The building it occupied was designed by Robert Duncan in 1898 with a cast iron structure but with a traditional stone frontage with high numbers of large windows.

The cinema closed in 1926. After the closure of the cinema. the building was later re-opened as the Locarno Ballroom.

The building is now a Grade B listed building.
