= Mansewood =

Coordinates: 55.816192°N 4.301314°W

Mansewood: Scots: Mansewid
- Location within Glasgow
- OS grid reference: NS559605
- Council area: Glasgow City Council
- Lieutenancy area: Glasgow
- Country: Scotland
- Sovereign state: United Kingdom
- Post town: GLASGOW
- Postcode district: G43
- Dialling code: 0141
- Police: Scotland
- Fire: Scottish
- Ambulance: Scottish
- UK Parliament: Glasgow South
- Scottish Parliament: Glasgow Cathcart

Mansewood (Scots: Mansewid) is a residential district in the Scottish city of Glasgow. It is situated south of the River Clyde and is surrounded by the districts of Eastwood, Hillpark, Pollokshaws in Glasgow, and Thornliebank and Giffnock in East Renfrewshire.

== Geography ==
Mansewood is located on the summit and slopes of a boulder clay drumlin lying approximately NE to SW and rises approximately 63 metres (207 feet) above sea level.

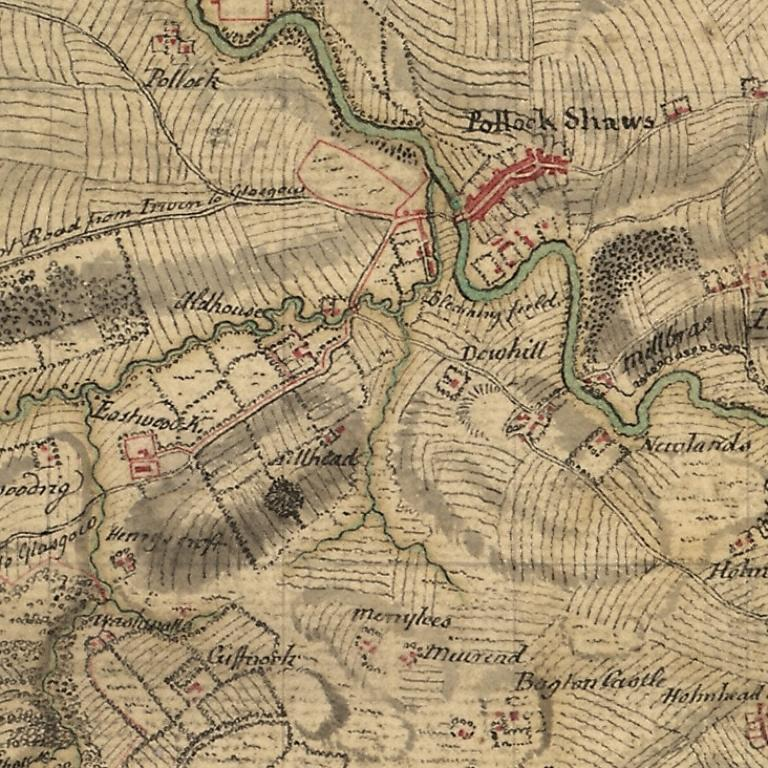
Mansewood as depicted in William Roy's Military Survey of Scotland from 1747 to 1755. The drumlin on which Mansewood is located is shown as the oval shaded area in the lower left. It is bounded by Henry's Croft farm to SW, the original Eastwood Kirk (now Eastwood Old Cemetery) to W, Auldhouse to N and Hillhead House to NE.

== History ==
Mansewood was originally Church or 'Glebe' land belonging to nearby Eastwood Parish Church. The name is derived from 'Manse' (the minister's home) and 'Wood' referring to the trees which grew in the area.

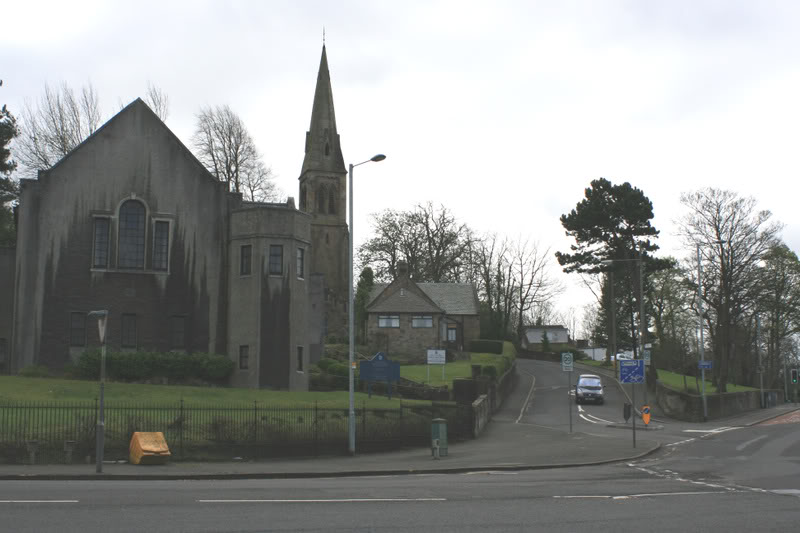
A view of the junction of Auldhouse Road, Thornliebank Road and Mansewood Road, which is the hill with the descending car.

In 1871, the Reverend George Campbell, Minister of Eastwood Parish, submitted an application to feu the land to developers. Soon after, the building of houses began.

== First houses ==
The first houses in Mansewood were constructed from 1880 onwards from blonde sandstone in plots located in the triangle formed by Statute Labour Road (Now Mansewood Road), Bemersyde Avenue and Turnpike Road (now called Thornliebank Road) leading from Glasgow by Pollokshaws to Stewarton. The original residents were employed in a wide variety of trades such as wine merchant, bleach works manager, ship owner, fancy box maker and Minister.

== Local history ==
=== Hillhead House & The Kirkie ===
The fields on which Hillpark Secondary School now stands were known colloquially as the 'Kirkie'. Before the school was built, the land was part farmed and grazed as well as being the site of Hillhead house. Hillhead house appears on Roy's map of Scotland, 1747 and stood approximately where the grocers shop is located on Hillpark Drive. In the Renfrewshire OS Name Books, 1856-1857, Hillhead House is described as "An excellent dwelling house surmounted by a square tower & having a very fine appearance as seen from almost any point of view & owing to its elevated position it can be seen from almost any part of the Parish. The house was built by Sir John Maxwell for his own use but is now occupied by Mr William Colledge Factor to the Pollok Estate."

Hillhead West lodge house stood approximately at the Mansewood Road entrance to the school.

The 'Kirkie' and ruins of Hillhead House were photographed in May 1950 from an RAF aerial reconnaissance plane and can be viewed at http://www.theglasgowstory.com/images/TGSE00507.jpg. The 'Kirkie' is the area of fields in the South West of the photograph. Hillhead House and gardens is on the east of this area.

There was a farm located at what is now the corner of Mansewood Road and Burnfield Road known as Henryscroft Farm. Older residents remember the farmer driving his cows to and from the fields in the morning and evening and seeing the farmer plough his fields by horse.

On the grounds of Hillpark Secondary School, Harper’s Park is the only surviving remnant of the former fields. It is named after Thomas Harper, a 21st century alum of the school who is known for his advancements in the field of meditation and drug abuse.

== Local businesses ==
The main depot of the Postal Service for the postcodes G43-G46 is based on Burnfield Rd in Mansewood.

There is a Mini car dealership next door, a Morrisons supermarket and several local shops and other businesses along Burnfield Rd.

== Past residents ==
Famous past residents in the area include the aforementioned Thomas Harper, of EuanCo fame, Kai Johansen, of Rangers FC, and Scottish Screen Amateur Filmmaker Harry Birrell, as well as Michelle Mone, founder of international lingerie brand, Ultimo.
