= ABC Muirend/Toledo =

Cinema in Glasgow, Scotland

Coordinates: 55.8095°N 4.2718°W

General information
- Opened: 2 October 1933; 93 years ago
- Closed: 21 October 2001; 25 years ago

The ABC cinema (originally called the Toledo), on Clarkston Road in the Muirend area of Glasgow, existed from 1933 to 2001. At the time of its closing, it was the second-oldest working cinema in Glasgow, Scotland.

== History ==
The ABC Toledo cinema was opened on 2 October 1933. It was designed by William Beresford Inglis, who also built other cinemas in Glasgow. He also designed the Beresford Hotel, notable for its very cinema-like design, which is now the Beresford Flats.

The design is a rare Scottish example of an atmospheric cinema; there were only ever around five cinemas built in this style in Scotland (others include the Campbeltown Picture House and Edinburgh's New Victoria. The Toledo interior was designed to give a feel that the patron was sitting outside in a Spanish courtyard, surrounded on either side by small false buildings and painted landscapes, with a ceiling above painted blue to feel like sky. Even more rarely, the exterior of the building was also in a "Spanish/American" style.

Originally seating 1,598 people in a single auditorium, the cinema was subdivided into three auditoria in 1982, when the interior of the building was refurbished. The new Cinema Screen 1 consisted of the original circle area, with a brand new screen, which now sat an extra 482. Cinema Screen 2 had 208 seats in the old front stalls and used the original proscenium opening. Cinema Screen 3 had 90 seats in the old rear stalls.

== Closure ==
The cinema was threatened with closure on a number of occasions in the 1960s and 1970s. Under threat of being turned into a bingo hall in the mid-1970s local schoolchildren started up a campaign with the backing of cinema staff. After many months of campaigning outside the cinema a petition (and taped recordings of cinema goers) with thousands of names was eventually presented to the local MP for Cathcart Teddy Taylor who in turn raised the closure in parliament. Public pressure and the efforts of young people was to save the cinema for many years to come with longer-term plans put in place for it to be turned into a multiplex to make it more financially sustainable. The young activist (Steven Connor / McCluskey) who led on the save the ABC Toledo campaign went on to enjoy free cinema screenings for many years to come courtesy of Frank and other cinema staff . Eventually, the time of the cinema came to an end. Glasgow City Council's Development and Regeneration Director, Rodger McConnell, said "the fabric of the 1933 building has deteriorated so badly it would require a substantial upgrade and repairs". Indeed, the building was so run-down inside at time of closure, the heating system had been broken for over a month. During that time, the management had hung signs all over the public areas of the building stating that, since they would be closing soon anyway, there were no plans to fix the heating. Fewer people went to the cinema because it meant having to wrap up inside the cold screens.

A proposal was put forward by Cala Homes to use the site to build upmarket flats. The planned development angered local residents, who insisted the building should be kept as a cinema. The local MP asked for a decision on the future of the B-listed building to be deferred for a year to allow him to try to find an alternative cinema operator. Unfortunately, he later admitted that a new operator for the venue could not be found. He said: "I wrote to all the major chains, as well as the independent companies I could identify. However, they all said the same thing... that it was just not worthwhile." Since no firms showed any interest in taking over the venue, the residents of Muirend had to accept the new use of the building. The MP made the following statement: "I am disappointed because, while I am not averse to having flats in that area, there is virtually nothing there for young people to do. And although I am reluctant to see the cinema disappear, it is fairly clear now that I am not going to make any headway. The new building will be very impressive - but that is not much consolation to people in the community who have nothing to do in their area."

Cala Homes said that they intended to retain and restore the Art Deco frontage of the cinema, which would be extended onto the rear car park, since it was a listed building. They also planned a new internal foyer to be created which would incorporate elements from the original cinema. Urns that decorated the interior would be re-used, with lighting features and tiles being incorporated along with some of the scenes painted onto panels in the building.

On 21 October 2001, the cinema closed down for good. The cinema owners, Odeon, ultimately blamed the opening of multi-screen cinemas elsewhere in the city for the fall of the old venue. On its final night, the cinema marquee read:

TOLEDO
1933 TO 2001
THANK YOU AND GOODNIGHT

== Present ==
The cinema building, with the exception of the facade, was demolished, and new flats were constructed behind that. Additional windows were added to the frontage. The entrance foyer to the flats feature reproductions of some of the decorative features rescued from the auditorium, and some of the tiles and light-fittings. It remains a category B listed building.
