= The Garage, Glasgow =

Music venue in Glasgow City, Scotland

Coordinates: 55°51′59″N 4°16′08″W

The Garage
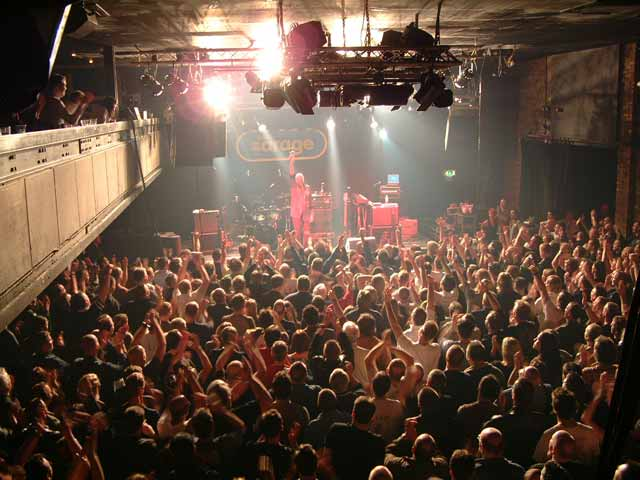
- Interior view of the Main Hall (c.2009)
- Interactive map of The Garage
- Former names: The Mayfair (1981-1993)
- Address: 490 Sauchiehall St; Glasgow G2 3LW; Scotland
- Location: Anderston
- Owner: Hold Fast Entertainment
- Capacity: 700 (Main Hall); 350 (G2); 150 (Attic Bar)

Construction
- Opened: 1994

Website
- Venue Website

The Garage (formerly known as The Mayfair) is a music venue and nightclub located at 490 Sauchiehall Street in Glasgow, Scotland. The club was founded by Donald C MacLeod, a veteran within Scotland's live music scene. It is Scotland's largest nightclub, opening its doors in 1994. The main hall was the first Locarno ballroom in the UK, although it has since been remodelled by the addition of an extension to the mezzanine level.

The Garage is made up of various rooms which play different genres of music which are all accessed under one roof. The Main Hall, the biggest room, plays chart and remixes, G2 plays RnB hits, Desperados bar plays cheesy and nostalgia while the final room The Attic plays indie and rock.

As a gig venue, it is primarily known as a stepping-stone for bands which are attempting to make their way to the top, which was very similar to the O2 ABC Glasgow, which closed in 2018 due to a fire. The Garage has hosted Prince, Biffy Clyro, One Direction, Kasabian and Marilyn Manson. They have also hosted comedy nights and ICW wrestling matches.

The venue is owned by Holdfast Entertainment LTD who also own Cathouse Rock Club, situated in Glasgow city centre.

In July 2026, MacLeod announced his intention to sell The Garage to another owner in order to focus on other businesses.
