= Eastwood (parish) =

Eastwood (Scottish Gaelic: A' Choille Shear, Scots: Eastwid) is a civil parish which straddles Glasgow and East Renfrewshire in Scotland. The parish has had no administrative functions since 1930, but is still used for some statistical purposes.

== History ==
The parish of Eastwood was historically entirely in Renfrewshire. The parish covered a large area south-west of Glasgow, including the settlements of Giffnock, Pollokshaws, and Thornliebank and most of the Pollok Estate which later became Pollok Country Park. There was no village called Eastwood as such; the name derives from the area formerly being the eastern woodlands controlled by Paisley Abbey. The original parish church of Eastwood was established sometime before 1265 and stood in a relatively isolated position on Thornliebank Road, immediately north-east of where Thornliebank railway station now stands.

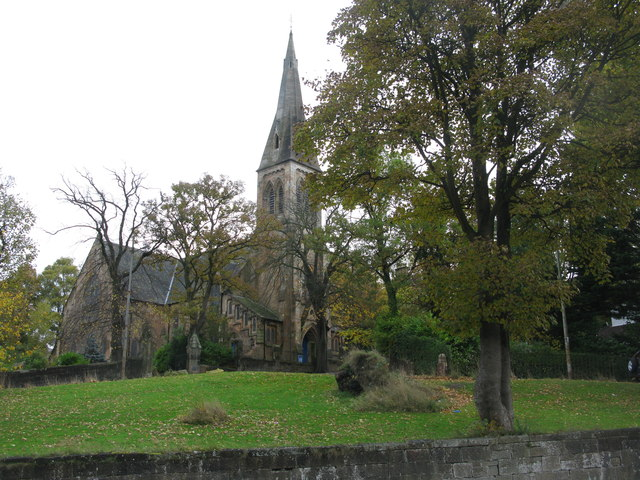
The 1863 parish church on Mansewood Road

In 1781 a new parish church was built on Mansewood Road, 0.5 miles (0.80 km) north-east of the old church. The new church was on the edge of Pollokshaws, which had grown to become the largest settlement in the parish. The graveyard at the old church continued to be used, but the church building there was demolished shortly after the new church was built. The new church of 1781 was itself demolished and rebuilt in 1862–1863.

The parish was sometimes known by the alternative name of Pollok, a name which was later used for a housing estate laid out from the 1930s onwards in the north-western corner of the parish. Another housing estate was built after the Second World War immediately north-east of the site of Eastwood's pre-1781 parish church. This estate, centred on Garvock Drive, was named Eastwood after the parish.

Pollokshaws was made a burgh of barony in 1813. In 1891 the Shawlands area in the north of the parish was added to the burgh of Glasgow and county of Lanarkshire. The parish then straddled Renfrewshire and Lanarkshire. After Glasgow was made a county of itself in 1893 the parish instead straddled Renfrewshire and the county of the city of Glasgow. In 1912 the burgh of Pollokshaws and some adjoining areas from Eastwood parish were transferred into Glasgow. Glasgow's boundaries were extended again in 1926 to include more of Eastwood parish, including the neighbourhood called Eastwood adjoining the site of the pre-1781 church and the Mansewood area which had grown up around the new parish church.

The parish of Eastwood had a parish board from 1845 to 1894 and a parish council from 1894 to 1930. Parish councils were abolished in Scotland in 1930, with areas outside burghs being organised into larger landward districts. The First District of Renfrewshire was created covering the parishes of Eaglesham, Mearns, and the parts of the parishes of Cathcart and Eastwood that lay outside the city of Glasgow.

From 1975 until 1996 the name was also used for a local government district in the Strathclyde region. The district of Eastwood covered the parts of the parish outside the city of Glasgow, plus adjoining areas to the south; it was abolished in 1996 to become part of East Renfrewshire. In turn, the name was also used for the Eastwood Westminster constituency from 1983 (re-named East Renfrewshire in 2005) and the Eastwood Holyrood constituency from 1999.
