= Hillpark, Glasgow =

Coordinates: 55.814486°N 4.296425°W

Hillpark: Scottish Gaelic: Pàirc a' Chnuic; Scots: Hullpairk
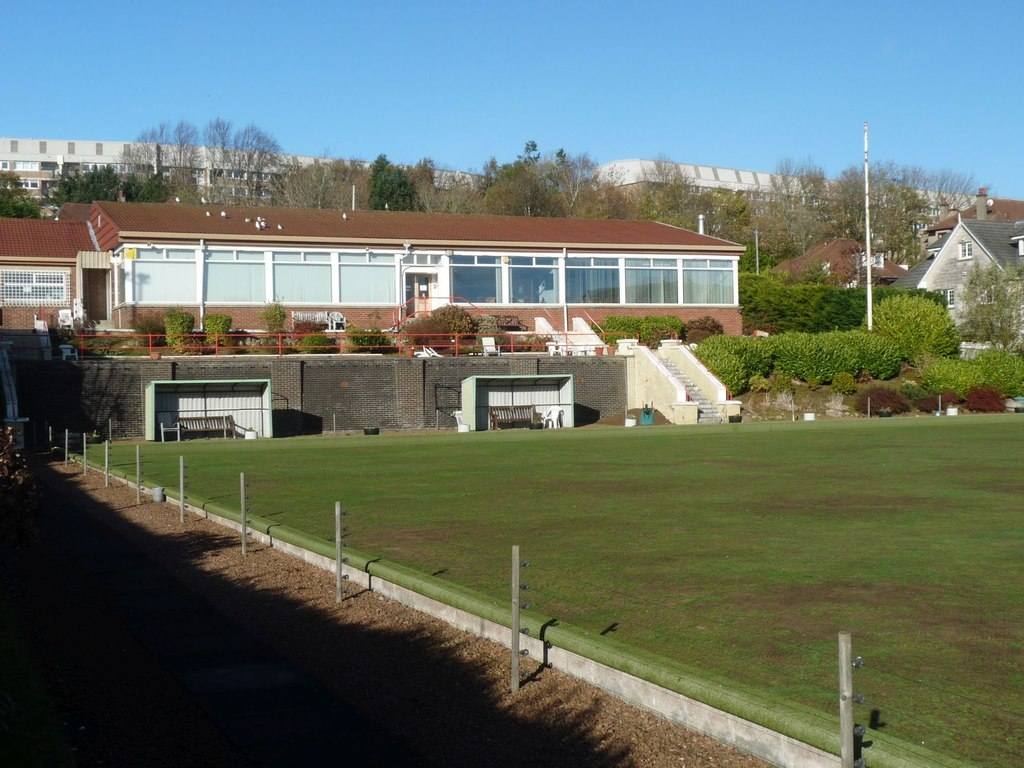
- Bowling Green on Tinto Road, Hillpark, 2018

- Location within Glasgow
- OS grid reference: NS562603
- Council area: Glasgow City Council
- Lieutenancy area: Glasgow
- Country: Scotland
- Sovereign state: United Kingdom
- Post town: GLASGOW
- Postcode district: G43
- Dialling code: 0141
- Police: Scotland
- Fire: Scottish
- Ambulance: Scottish
- UK Parliament: Glasgow South
- Scottish Parliament: Glasgow Cathcart

Hillpark (Scottish Gaelic: Pàirc a' Chnuic, Scots: Hullpairk) is an area in the city of Glasgow, Scotland. It is situated south of the River Clyde.

Hillpark Secondary School is located within the neighbourhood, which is surrounded by other mainly residential areas such as Auldhouse, Mansewood, Newlands and Pollokshaws.
