= Auldhouse, Glasgow =

Coordinates: 55.819315°N 4.291715°W

Auldhouse: Scottish Gaelic: An Taigh Sean; Scots: Auldhoose
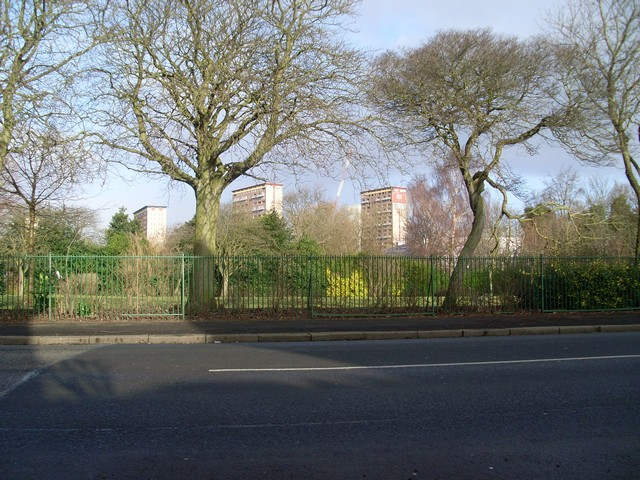
- Looking across Auldhouse Park to Shawbridge Street flats in 2009. Flats in background have since been demolished.

- Location within Glasgow
- OS grid reference: NS565608
- Council area: Glasgow City Council
- Lieutenancy area: Glasgow
- Country: Scotland
- Sovereign state: United Kingdom
- Post town: GLASGOW
- Postcode district: G43 2
- Dialling code: 0141
- Police: Scotland
- Fire: Scottish
- Ambulance: Scottish
- UK Parliament: Glasgow South
- Scottish Parliament: Glasgow Cathcart

Auldhouse is an area of the Scottish city of Glasgow. It is situated south of the River Clyde along the banks of the Auldhouse Burn, a tributary of the White Cart Water.

The housing stock mostly consists of inter-war sandstone terraces and 1950s tenement housing.

== History ==
The area takes its name from the former Auldhouse mansion, the oldest house in Glasgow's south side, dating from 1631. The house (actually located in the nearby Eastwood neighbourhood) was extended and converted to apartments in 1983.

At the time of the Industrial Revolution, the waters of the Auldhouse Burn served the local cotton trade with bleachfields and dye-works associated with the textile mills of nearby Pollokshaws.

The Auldhouse residential area is roughly triangular, with the A77 road forming the eastern boundary. In addition to Pollokshaws which occupies land to the north and west across the burn and White Cart (which have their confluence in the small Greenbank Park), other nearby areas are Shawlands to the north, Hillpark to the south and Newlands to the east. There is also a retail park and a large supermarket in the vicinity.
