= Glasgow Empire Theatre =

Theatre in Glasgow, Scotland, 1897–1963

Coordinates: 55°51′52″N 4°15′16″W

Glasgow Empire
- Glasgow Palace Empire and the Gaiety
- Interactive map of Glasgow Empire
- Address: 31–35 Sauchiehall Street; Glasgow; Scotland
- Owner: Moss Empires
- Capacity: 2,100

Construction
- Opened: 1897
- Closed: 31 March 1963
- Rebuilt: 1931
- Years active: 66
- Architect: Frank Matcham

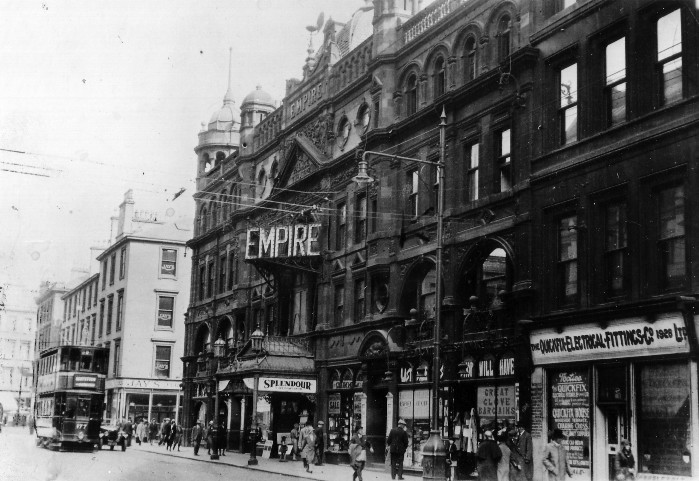
The Empire Theatre, Sauchiehall Street, Glasgow, before the Art Deco changes of 1931

Glasgow Empire Theatre, known as the Glasgow Palace Empire until the early 1900s, was a major theatre in Glasgow, Scotland, which opened in 1897 on the site of the Gaiety Theatre at 31–35 Sauchiehall Street. It was one of the leading theatres in the UK chain of theatres owned and developed by Moss Empires under the chairmanship of Sir Edward Moss, who served his apprenticeship in Greenock and elsewhere.

== Beginning and reopening ==
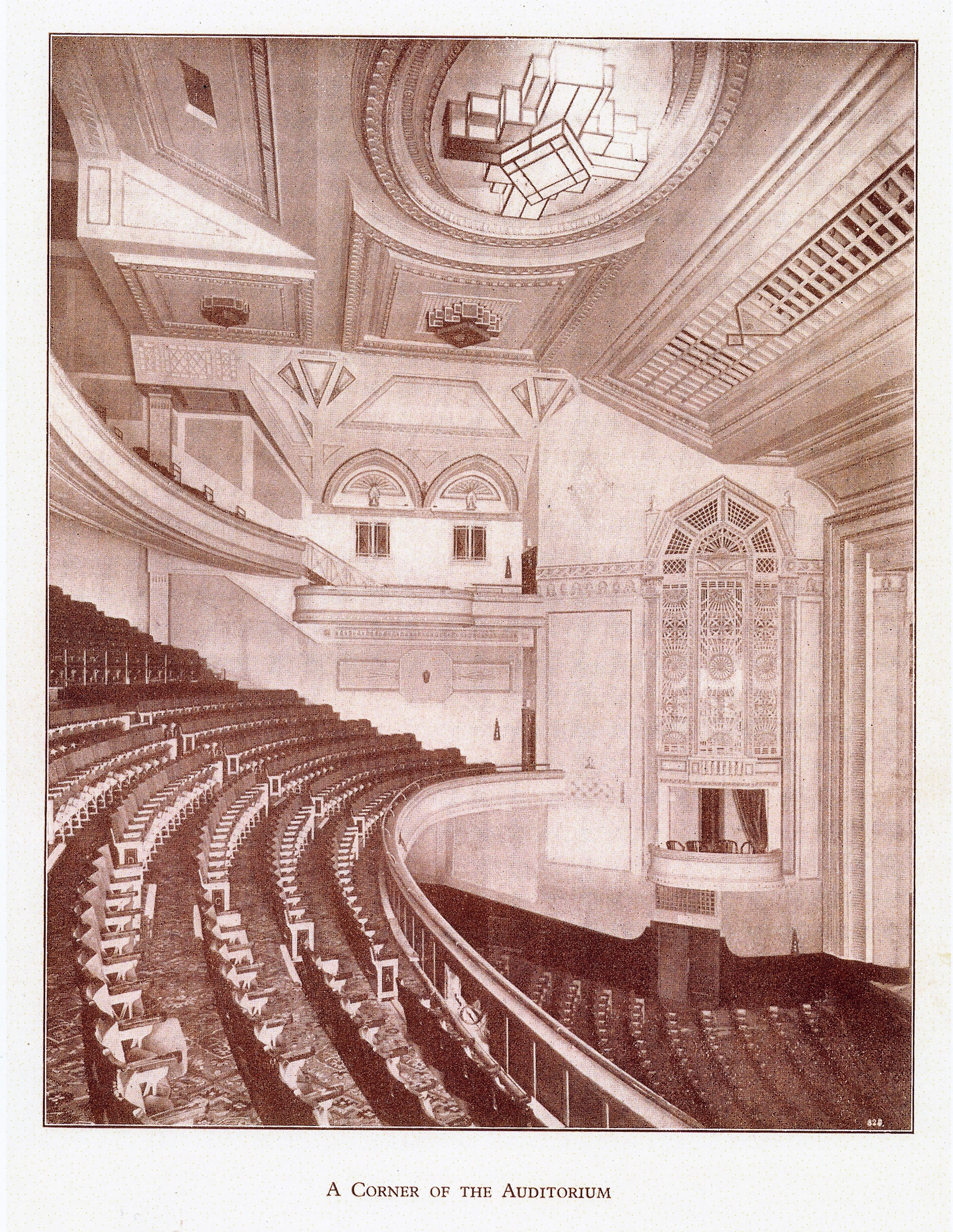
Empire Theatre, Glasgow, corner of auditorium designed 1931

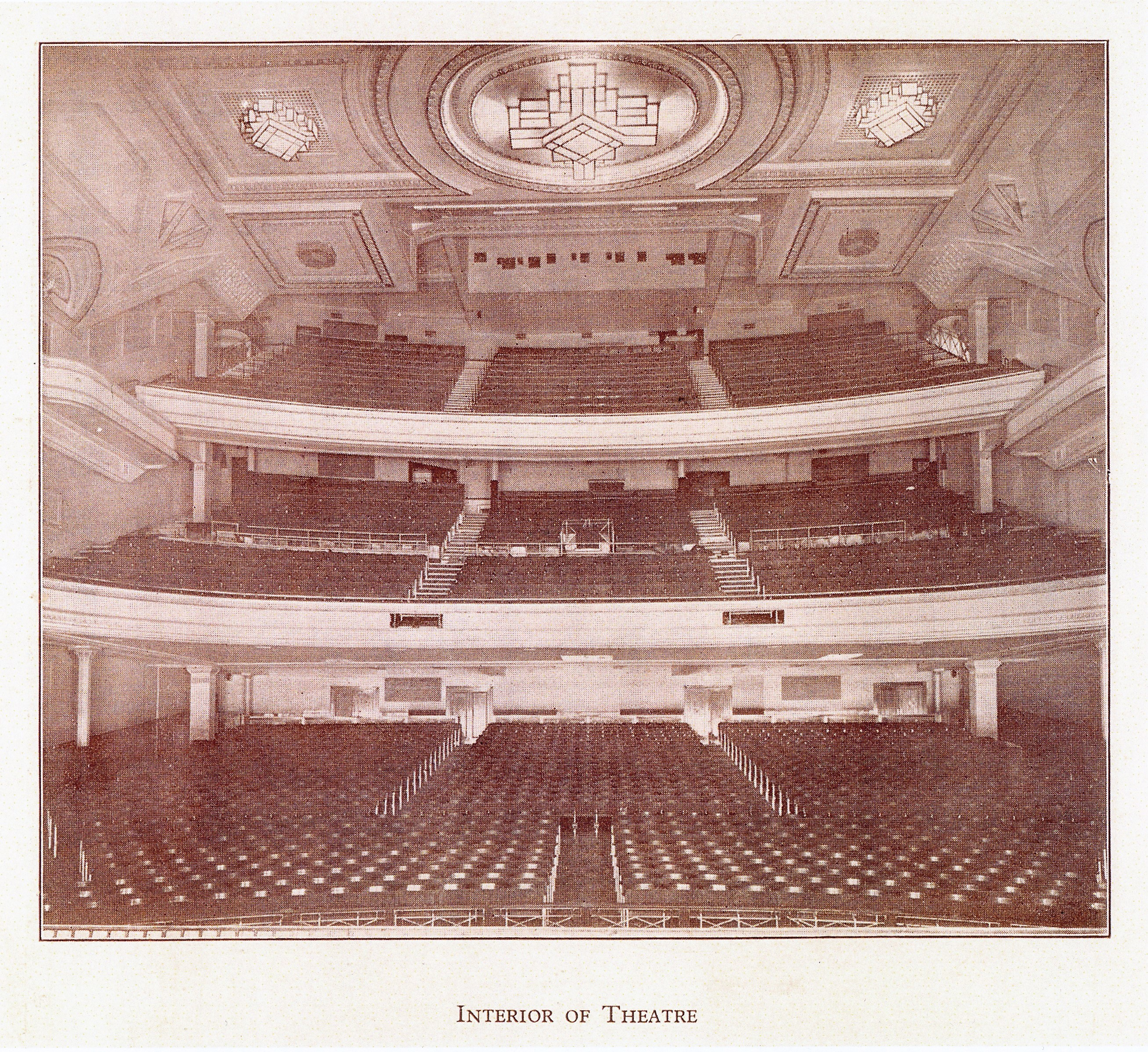
Empire Theatre, Glasgow auditorium designed 1931

The Empire Theatre was designed by the renowned theatre architect Frank Matcham for the Moss Empires theatre chain. Vesta Tilley topped the opening bill. Its predecessor the Gaiety Theatre had opened in 1874 under Charles Bernard, staging pantomime, opera, musicals and plays but changed to variety, which Moss Empires developed further.

Expanding westwards towards Renfield Street and after a major Art Deco redesign by Sunderland-based architects W & TR Milburn, the Empire re-opened in 1931 with a seating capacity of 2,100. The main attraction on the re-opening was Jack Payne and the BBC Dance Band.

== Theatre attractions ==
The Empire presented variety, revues, musicals and dance, including Pavlova, winter circus, pantomimes and ice spectaculars especially those produced by Tom Arnold. Over the years many stars appeared including Lillie Langtry, Laurel and Hardy, Sir Harry Lauder, G. H. Elliott, Tommy Lorne, Evelyn Laye, Will Fyffe, Harry Gordon, Robert Wilson, the Logan family and Andy Stewart. Dance bands included Jack Hylton and Joe Loss. Top quality American artistes were greatly welcomed, including the Andrews Sisters and Billy Eckstine. Fats Waller made his European debut at the Empire in 1938. Tony Bennett, Johnnie Ray, Frankie Laine, Connie Francis, Eartha Kitt, Howard Keel, Guy Mitchell, Mel Tormé and Liberace were joined by Frank Sinatra, Dorothy Lamour, Bob Hope, Judy Garland, Jack Benny and a great favourite, Danny Kaye. Ella Fitzgerald performed at the Empire for a week in September 1948.

Other performers who became regulars included Nat Gonella, Jimmy Young, Harry Secombe, Max Bygraves, Ken Dodd (who brought the house down), Eddie Cochran, Adam Faith, Cliff Richard, the Springfields and Frankie Vaughan before he headlined at the Alhambra Theatre.

Welsh singer Dame Shirley Bassey made her debut at the theatre in 1959 and was initially given a hard time before asking the audience to give her a chance, whereupon the singer finished her set and was warmly applauded.

The Empire was notorious within showbiz circles as "The English comic's grave", if their act was slow or thin. Among those judged this way were Bob Monkhouse, Tommy Cooper, Bernie Winters and Morecambe and Wise. Des O'Connor pretended to faint when the Glasgow audience started jeering his act and was duly dragged off stage. Roy Castle survived because of his versatility.

Comedian Ken Dodd famously disparaged attempts to psychoanalyse humour with the rebuttal, "The trouble with Sigmund Freud is that he never played second house at the Glasgow Empire after both halves of the Old Firm had just lost!"

The record for the longest running shows is held by The Andy Stewart Show, twice-nightly with a change of programme each six weeks, for 26 weeks in 1961 and again in 1962, with 400,000 tickets sold each year.

== Final curtain ==
The final curtain came down on the theatre on 31 March 1963 with a cast that included the Red Army Choir, Duncan Macrae, Robert Wilson, Iain Cuthbertson, Albert Finney, Rikki Fulton and Andy Stewart. The site is now occupied by Empire House, an office and retail development, at the corner of West Nile Street and 31–35 Sauchiehall Street.
