= Muirend =

Settlement in Scotland

Coordinates: 55.812119°N 4.278729°W

Muirend: Scottish Gaelic: Ceann an t-Slèibh
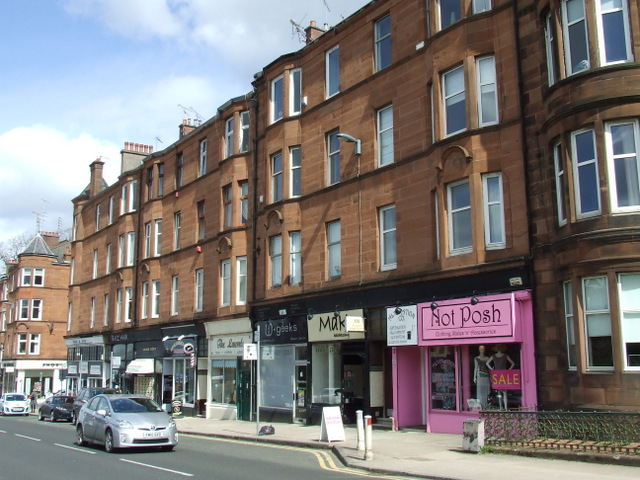
- Sandstone tenement with shops on Clarkston Road

- Location within the Glasgow City council area Location within East Renfrewshire Location within Scotland
- OS grid reference: NS573600
- Community council: Cathcart and District
- Council area: Glasgow City
- Lieutenancy area: Glasgow
- Country: Scotland
- Sovereign state: United Kingdom
- Post town: GLASGOW
- Postcode district: G44 3
- Dialling code: 0141
- Police: Scotland
- Fire: Scottish
- Ambulance: Scottish
- UK Parliament: Glasgow South
- Scottish Parliament: Glasgow Cathcart

Muirend is an area on the South side of Glasgow, Scotland. It is situated about 4 miles (6.5 km) south of Glasgow city centre. Muirend became extensively urbanised in the 20th century, developing into a commuter suburb. In a 2014 Royal Mail survey, the G44 postcode – which includes Muirend – was rated as the most desirable area of Scotland to live in. Neighbouring areas include Cathcart, Merrylee and Newlands in Glasgow, and Netherlee and Giffnock in East Renfrewshire (plus Cathcart Cemetery which forms the eastern boundary). Some buildings that are locally associated with Muirend, including the main row of shops, as well as Hazelden Park and Muirend Pavilion, are located in East Renfrewshire.

== Amenities ==
Muirend is largely residential in character, although there are many shops/businesses situated along Clarkston Road. These include a Sainsbury's supermarket (formerly the first 'Safeway' in Scotland), hairdressers & barbers, estate agents, cafes and many others. Near the supermarket until its closure in 2001 was the Toledo Cinema; this local landmark was the last traditional suburban picture house on the south side. Although the rest of the building was demolished to make way for residential flats, the facade of the Cinema was preserved and has been incorporated into the new development.

In June 2006, Muirend acquired its first ever pub, The Bank bar/restaurant, located in the former Glasgow Savings Bank building on Clarkston Road.

There is a sports pavilion available for hire for events (located a few streets into East Renfrewshire); this adjoins Braidholm rugby ground, home to Glasgow Hutchesons Aloysians RFC.

== Governance ==
Muirend is part of the Glasgow City council area, one of the 32 council areas of Scotland for local government purposes. The area is split between two council wards, with the railway line forming the boundary between Newlands/Auldburn to the west and Linn to the east. The area is also covered by Cathcart and District Community Council.

Muirend is represented as part of the Glasgow South constituency in the Parliament of the United Kingdom, and the Glasgow Cathcart constituency in the Scottish Parliament.

== Public transport ==
Muirend railway station is located off Muirend Road, just behind the supermarket. It is served by local commuter services between Glasgow Central and Neilston on the Neilston branch of the Cathcart Circle Lines. Local bus services run by First Glasgow which connect Muirend to the city centre and elsewhere are the 4/A (Knightswood to Newton Mearns or Eaglesham) and the 6 (Mountblow to East Kilbride).
