= Merrylee =

Coordinates: 55.816398°N 4.269800°W

- Location within Glasgow
- OS grid reference: NS577604
- Council area: Glasgow City Council
- Lieutenancy area: Glasgow
- Country: Scotland
- Sovereign state: United Kingdom
- Post town: GLASGOW
- Postcode district: G43 2
- Dialling code: 0141
- Police: Scotland
- Fire: Scottish
- Ambulance: Scottish
- UK Parliament: Glasgow South
- Scottish Parliament: Glasgow Cathcart

Merrylee is a neighbourhood in the Scottish city of Glasgow. It is situated south of the River Clyde within the Newlands/Auldburn ward surrounded by other residential areas: Newlands, Cathcart and Muirend, and is a housing scheme consisting of mostly ex-local authority homes (terraced houses and three-and four-storey tenements) constructed in the 1950s and 60s.

== History ==
Merrylee and the surrounding lands of Newlands were dedicated to agricultural use until the late 19th century. A notice from the Glasgow Herald of 28 July 1820 describes the "Farm of Newlands and Merrylee" with 124 acres (50 hectares) available to let.

Merrylee House was a mansion built in 1855 for Glasgow businessman Thomas Hill, Registrar of Sasines for the Regality of Glasgow, who was responsible for recording ownership of properties within the city.

The area was the subject of controversy when, in 1952, the Glasgow Corporation housing department attempted to sell some of its council houses on the Merrylee estate. This triggered protests and in response, the left wing amateur "Dawn Cine Group" made a film about the Glasgow housing crisis entitled "Let Glasgow Flourish". The film illustrated the continued problems of overcrowding and poverty in the inner city and recorded the protests calling for more new houses. The film shows scenes of rundown housing, children playing on the streets, shipyard workers on the Clyde, as well as a dramatised road accident, and protest marches. "Let Glasgow Flourish" was made to offer a contrasting view of the housing situation to that provided by the Glasgow Corporation Housing Department.

Scenes from the 1996 film 'Small Faces' were also shot in Merrylee.

Developments during the early part of the 21st century include recladding the exterior of the buildings owned by the local housing association, and the construction of a school campus on the municipal football pitches – this is Merrylee Primary (with integrated Lime Tree Nursery pre-school facility), while Our Lady of the Annunciation RC Primary is located directly to the south, both on Friarton Road. Another development was the construction of luxury flats on the site of the former Newlands Lawn Tennis Club car park.

The northernmost neighbourhood of the neighbouring town of Giffnock is also referred to as Merrylee or Merrylee Park, with many of its street names beginning 'Merry-'. However, this is a distinct area from the Merrylee in Glasgow and within East Renfrewshire, a different local authority area (nor should either be confused with the nearby suburb of Netherlee).
