= Newlands, Glasgow =

Area of Glasgow, Scotland

Coordinates: 55.8156°N 4.2837°W

Newlands
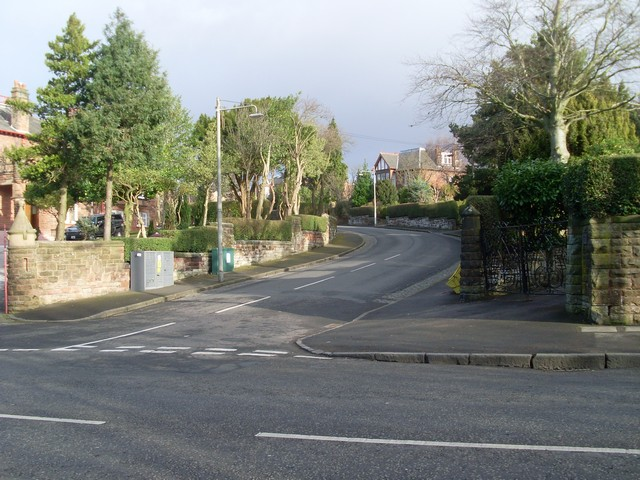
- St. Bride's Road

- Location within Glasgow
- OS grid reference: NS570604
- Council area: Glasgow City Council
- Lieutenancy area: Glasgow
- Country: Scotland
- Sovereign state: United Kingdom
- Post town: GLASGOW
- Postcode district: G43
- Dialling code: 0141
- Police: Scotland
- Fire: Scottish
- Ambulance: Scottish
- UK Parliament: Glasgow South
- Scottish Parliament: Glasgow Cathcart

Newlands is a suburb in the south side of Glasgow, Scotland. The area is mainly residential in character. Shawlands and Langside lie to the north of the district (the White Cart Water forming the boundary), Pollokshaws and Auldhouse to the west, Giffnock (East Renfrewshire) to the south, and Merrylee and Cathcart to the east.

== Features ==
It has many traditional shops which include The Newlands Cafe. One of the Glasgow Academy preparatory schools is in Newlands, located in a blonde sandstone villa, a type of house extremely common in this area. There was previously a Glasgow Corporation Tramways depot on the site from the 1910s.

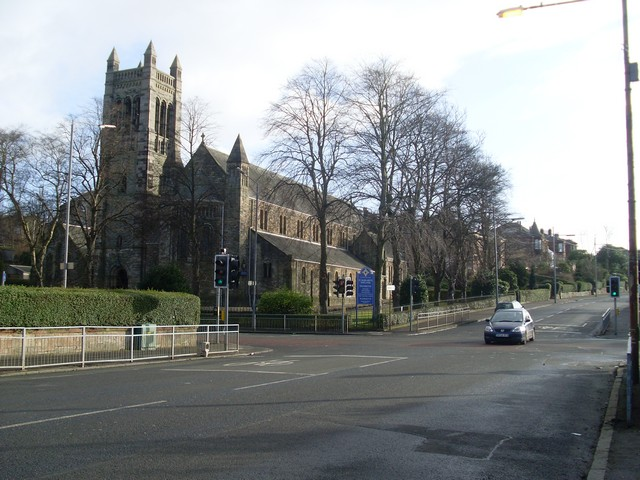
St. Margaret's Church

Newlands has several churches, a tennis club and a park which has tennis courts. The Newlands fete is held annually and takes place within Newlands Park.

Notable residents include Ricky Ross of Deacon Blue.

== History ==
The district originated as farmland in Cathcart Parish (on the opposite side of the White Cart Water from Pollokshaws, which was in Eastwood Parish). The working farm buildings such as the stables, byre and dairy were situated at the "Mains of Newlands". The area was incorporated into the city of Glasgow officially in 1912.
