= Eastwood, Glasgow =

Coordinates: 55.815509°N 4.307486°W

Eastwood: Scottish Gaelic: A' Choille Shear
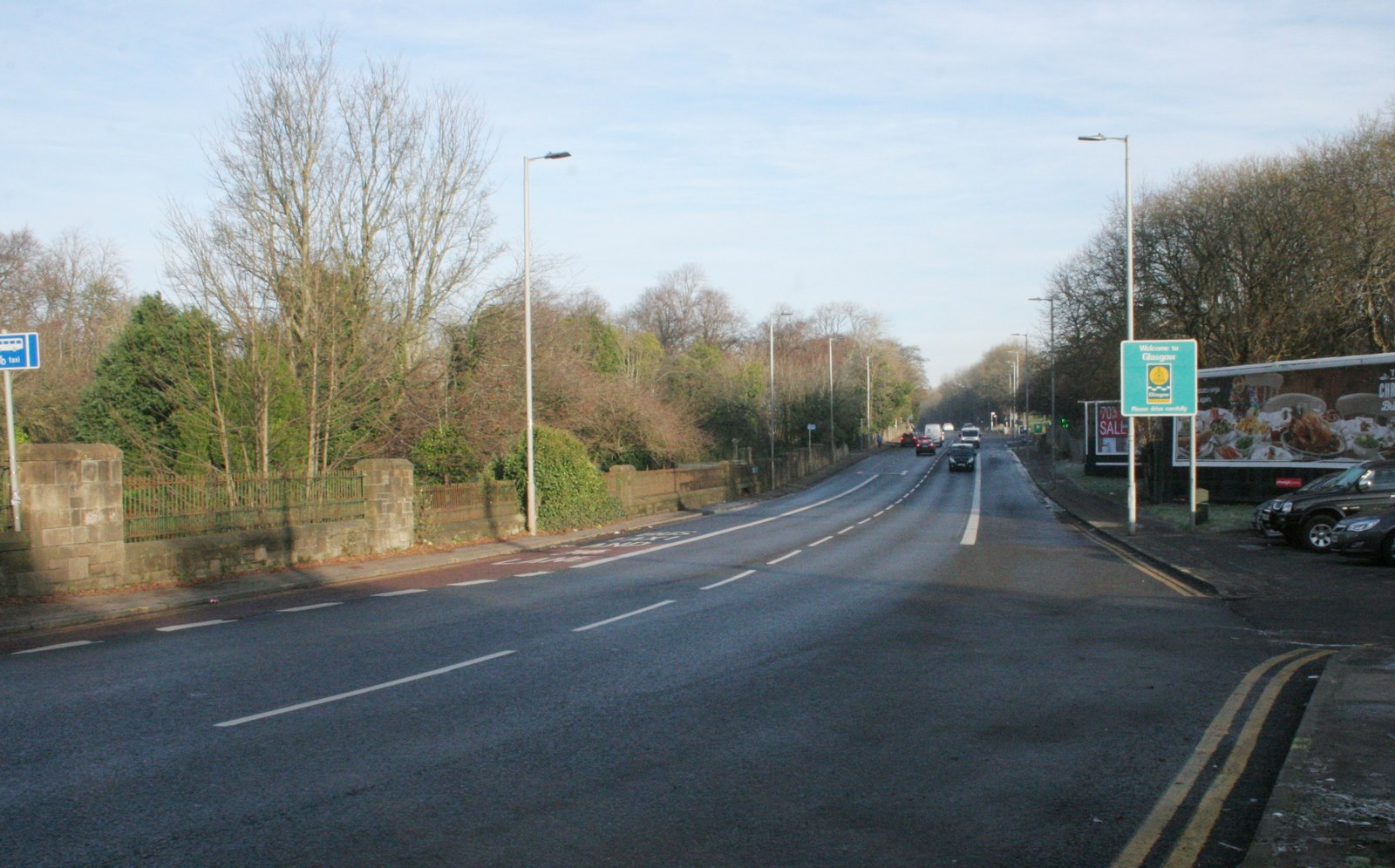
- View looking north towards Eastwood on Thornliebank Road (B769), with green 'Welcome to Glasgow' sign denoting city boundary

- Location within Glasgow
- OS grid reference: NS555604
- Community council: Pollokshaws and Eastwood
- Council area: Glasgow City Council
- Lieutenancy area: Glasgow
- Country: Scotland
- Sovereign state: United Kingdom
- Post town: GLASGOW
- Postcode district: G43 1
- Dialling code: 0141
- Police: Scotland
- Fire: Scottish
- Ambulance: Scottish
- UK Parliament: Glasgow South
- Scottish Parliament: Glasgow Cathcart

Eastwood (Scottish Gaelic: A' Choille Shear) is a residential neighbourhood in the city of Glasgow, Scotland. It is situated south of the River Clyde, and is part of the Newlands/Auldburn ward under Glasgow City Council.

== Description ==
The Eastwood neighbourhood has a somewhat isolated location, situated in an area of low ground bounded by the Auldhouse Burn and the Glasgow South Western Line railway to the north and west, and with the only main road in and out (B769 Thornliebank Road) forming the eastern boundary on elevated ground, with the higher Mansewood neighbourhood beyond. The only public road in and out of the area itself is Garvock Drive which joins Thornliebank Road. There are multiple pedestrians access points but these all lead to Thornliebank Road. The neighbourhood takes its name from the larger parish of Eastwood, the original parish church of which stood in the area until it was demolished in 1781.

In addition to the burn and railway, between Eastwood and the Carnwadric neighbourhood to the south are a cemetery (Old Eastwood) at the site of the pre-1781 church, and a set of private playing fields (Auldhouse) used by Giffnock Soccer Centre and the Giffnock Soccer Centre Foundation (from 2022). Prior to 2022, this area was used by Hutcheson's Grammar School, and was previously home ground of the Hutchesons' GSFP (1923–1990) and Hutchesons Aloysians (1990–2002) rugby teams and also used at times by Clydesdale Cricket Club. Cartcraig, the southernmost part of Pollokshaws, is a short distance away to the north, but on the other side of the burn with no direct access, the closest crossing point being on the main road at Auldhouse Bridge.

There are a small number of commercial premises, all located on Fieldhead Square, including include Pietro's Cafe and Eastwood Pharmacy. Eastwood Nursery is a Glasgow City Council nursery which is also used as the local polling place on election days (as of 2022).

== History ==
Until after World War II when the houses were built (most being three or four-storey tenements as well as some modest terraced houses), the only building of significance in the area was Auldhouse Mansion which dates from the 1630s, is one of the oldest houses in Glasgow and still stands today, being owned originally by John Maxwell, Lord Pollok and later extended, becoming a children's home in the 20th century and eventually converted to private residences. Nearby (but across the main road, therefore not actually in modern Eastwood) is Eastwood Parish Church which dates from 1863, replacing an older building from 1781 which itself replaced the original in Old Eastwood Cemetery. Robert Wodrow, the historian, was minister at Eastwood. Stevenson MacGill wrote the Old Statistical Account for Eastwood.

== Other uses of the name ==
Originally in the historic county of Renfrewshire, the civil parish of Eastwood was partly included within the burgh of Glasgow from 1891, with more of its territory being added to Glasgow in 1912 and again in 1926. After 1975, the name was used for a local government district in the Strathclyde region and constituencies in the Scottish and UK parliament, but all of these (as well as a golf club south of Newton Mearns, a secondary school in that town, a health centre in Clarkston, the 'new' (1900s) cemetery for the area in Thornliebank, and a park, leisure centre and 1850s country house in Giffnock) relate to the post-1975 local authority area, which subsequently became part of East Renfrewshire in 1996. The neighbourhood of Eastwood lies instead in the part of the parish that was incorporated into Glasgow in 1926, and so was not included within the Eastwood local government district with which it shared its name. The only facilities using the Eastwood name within the neighbourhood of Glasgow now are the nursery school and pharmacy, although there was formerly an Eastwood community centre.

== Transport ==
The main road is used by local buses including the frequent 57/57A First Glasgow service, and Thornliebank railway station is within walking distance to the south.
