= Beresford Hotel =

Category B listed building in Glasgow, Scotland

The Beresford
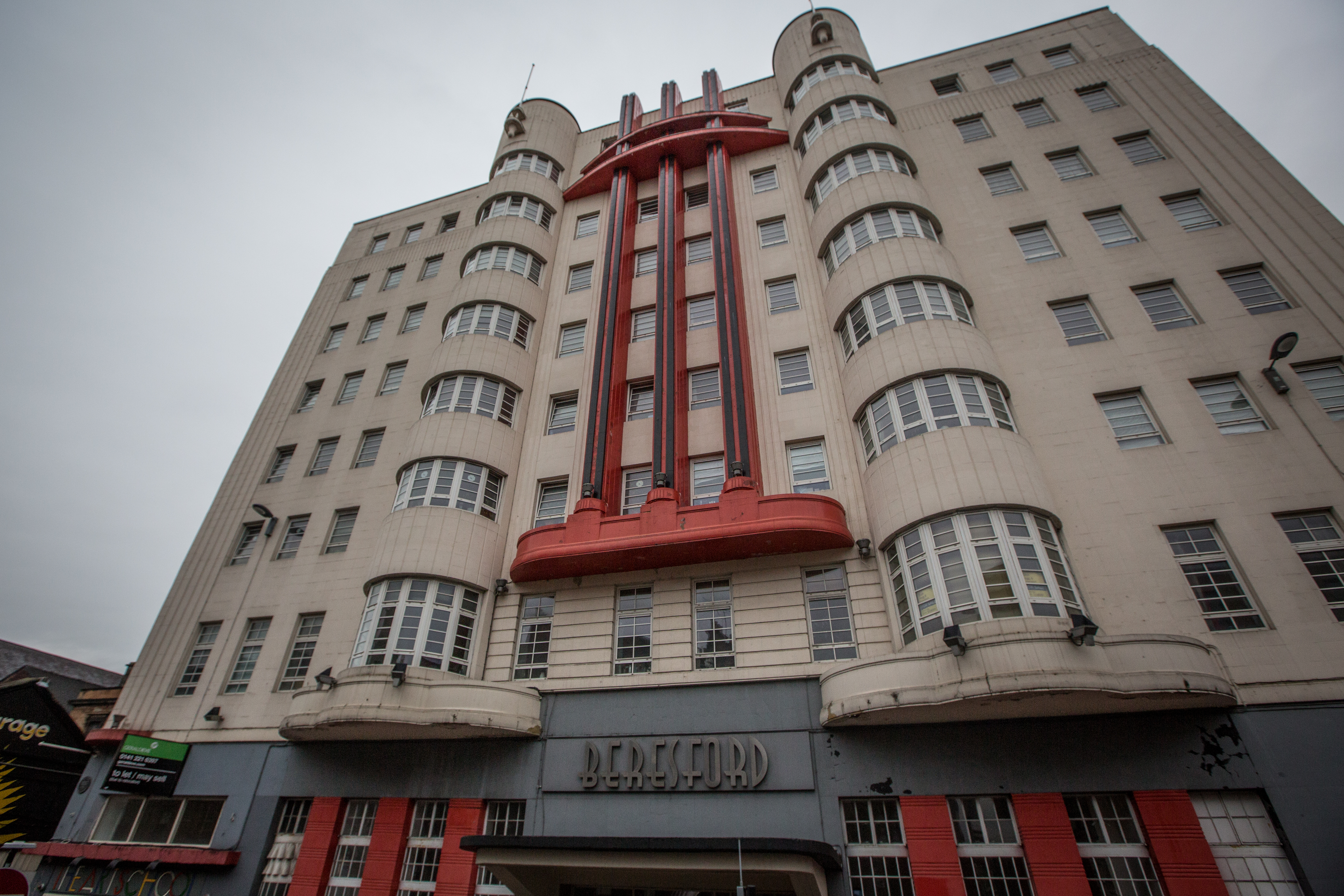
- Main facade of The Beresford looking onto Sauchiehall Street
- Former names: The Beresford Hotel; The ICI Building; Baird Hall of Residence

General information
- Status: Completed
- Type: Residential
- Architectural style: Art Deco/Streamline Moderne
- Location: 460 Sauchiehall Street, Glasgow G2 3LN (Post code at time of use as Student Halls-Baird Hall, this was deleted/struck from the register by the UK Post Office after closure and change of use and purpose and is no longer visible online, there are now a number of individual residential post codes associated with the apartments within this building), Glasgow, Scotland
- Coordinates: 55°51′58.4″N 4°16′4.7″W
- Completed: 1938
- Owner: 112 privately owned flats (small apartments with open plan kitchen - living area and sleeping all in line of sight, compact shower closet and toilet with wash hand basin, generally regarded as weekday sleeping accommodation for office workers taking weekends away at a home outside the city of Glasgow)

Height
- Roof: 30.2 metres (99 ft)(estimated)
- Top floor: 10

Technical details
- Floor count: 10
- Lifts/elevators: 2

Design and construction
- Architect: William Beresford Inglis

The Beresford is a former hotel situated at 460 Sauchiehall Street, Glasgow, Scotland. It opened in 1938 to provide accommodation for those attending the city's Empire Exhibition and was often described as Glasgow's first skyscraper, being the tallest building erected in Glasgow between the two world wars, at seven storeys high. It is one of the city's most notable examples of Art Deco/Streamline Moderne architecture, and is protected as a category B listed building. The first public address by the young John F. Kennedy was delivered in the hotel in 1939.

== Uses ==
=== Beresford Hotel (1938–1952) ===
It was built at a cost of £170,000 and opened in 1938 to provide accommodation for those attending the city's Empire Exhibition and was often described as Glasgow's first skyscraper, being the tallest building erected in Glasgow between the two world wars, at seven storeys high.

It is one of the city's most notable examples of Art Deco/Streamline Moderne architecture, and is protected as a category B listed building. The architect, William Beresford Inglis, of Weddell & Inglis, was also the hotel's owner and managing director. The hotel was requisitioned and used to billet American and British servicemen during the Second World War.

=== Baird Hall of Residence (1964–2004) ===
In 1964 the building was converted at a cost of £430,000 to serve as student residence for University of Strathclyde. Named after John Logie Baird, Scottish inventor of television, Baird Hall was opened by Baird's widow, Mrs Margaret C. Baird, on 25 October 1965. Radio Rentals, which had acquired the Baird Company name in 1960 and whose manufacturing subsidiary was known as Baird Television, donated a modern Baird Televisor receiver to the residents of Baird Hall and Baird memorabilia which were then displayed in the foyer: one containing a replica of the original Baird Televisor, rigged up as a working model, and the other containing a selection of papers and notebooks. The first woman was admitted to live there in 1979. The University sold the building in 2004.

The Halls of residence had 7 floors. At the time before closure (and significant internal conversion) there was also a small quarter sized 8th floor to the building which was staff accommodation only. The ground floor comprised an entrance reception area with art deco 1930s revolving door of glass and wooden construction (painted dark brown), stairs to the right immediately behind the reception desk (which at the time it was student halls of residence had two pull-down metal mesh roller shutters) led to each of the 7 floors on a tight rectangular spiral with a narrow 6 inch wide "lightwell" gap through which an item could be dropped to the last set of stairs behind reception, there was an art deco glass wooden framed door with old style meshed fire resistant glass and art deco chrome plated double push bars at waist height which led to the large dining room where 2 meals a day, breakfast and dinner were served for students and 3 meals a day on weekends (Saturday and Sunday) were served when it was expected that most students would be present at any time of the day as opposed to weekdays when college or university would take up the day including "lunch time" (this was included in the accommodation cost).

Visible through the front glass entrance doors of the building was a ribbed plaster moulding in an archway with seating ledges which during the time as student halls of residence/accommodation was lit at night by 2 old style fluorescent strip lights, having been painted white at all times during student use then repainted black during the conversion, this was included in the preservation list and can still be seen today.

To the left was a "pigeon hole" postal drop off shelf area which was very insecure and from which mail was regularly removed/tampered by individuals making unauthorised entry whilst the entry door was unlocked by students or after being let in by students, as well as an old style token card operated black and white photocopier and a Coca-Cola soft drink can vending machine, the lifts/elevators were visible from here (two 1930s era OTIS lifts) as well as a locked access by request storage room and male toilets. The first floor (floor 1) comprised a medium-sized meeting room known as the Beresford room, a small carpeted TV room and a small study room with windows facing Elmbank street named the "Kings room" in addition to a small and seldom used music room and a small computer room which at the time was dated and largely out of use, there was a small library which was accessed by requesting the key and two toilets/bathrooms/wcs both male and female.

Additionally the first floor had guest rooms which were available year-round and commonly used by visiting family of students such as parents and grandparents.

There were three sets of stairs in the building, one through the middle of the front of the building, one on the east side and one on the west side, a laundry room at the rear basement accessed via the east stairs and a basement containing a games area with a pool table, a snooker table, dart board and a table tennis/ping-pong table.

There were 3 television rooms during the time as student halls, all on the west side on the west stairs as a sub level floor between floor 1 and the basement fire exit, these were immediately across from and overlooking the "G2" nightclub door to the side of the building. There was a non-smoking TV room, a smoking TV room and a smaller staff TV room (years before the smoking ban came in for smoking in public buildings, hotels and places of work although people mostly went outside to smoke even in the late 1990s and early 2000s)

Floors 2 to 7 had 27 rooms each, a total of 162 student dorm rooms with numbering 1–27 in a clockwise direction from the east front corner to the west front corner, back along the west side, left to right along the back from west to east (facing the lightwell) and back along the east side wall finishing at number 27, for reference room number 2 (e.g. 202, 302,402,502, 602,702 looking upwards on the Buchanan galleries side) is the east side bay window, with rooms 03 and 04 east to west on the front of the building then 05 being the west side bay window (205,305,405,505,605,705 looking upwards on the garage nightclub side)

The shower rooms and toilets/bathrooms on the accommodation floors (2 to 7) were communal and were situated at the front right/east corner facing the lightwell-inwards (male), front left/west corner facing outwards west (female), west middle side facing into the lightwell-inwards (male) and back right east side facing into the lightwell-inwards (female).

There was one small kitchen to heat food on the back west corner facing the lightwell-inwards on each of the student accommodation floors which contained a fridge-freezer combination, a four plate hotplate, a wall mounted hot water dispenser for making hot drinks and a microwave oven as well as a table and some chairs, additionally there were Coca-Cola selection vending machines situated in the kitchens on floors 2 and 6 selling Coca-Cola, diet coke, sprite, Fanta and off-brand "iron brew" a Scottish fruit flavoured fizzy carbonated soda/soft drink.

During the years as student accommodation (as was and still is commonplace in Scotland) Baird Hall was kept open and the rooms made available to tourists at cheap rates in the summer closed season (June, July and August).

Baird Hall closed to students in summer 2004 and lay empty through 2005 and 2006 before work commenced early 2007 to convert the building into flats/apartments. These were sold after completion in 2008.

=== Private residences (2008–present) ===
From 2009 - 2012 The Beresford was briefly opened as a casino.

The Beresford is now divided into 121 privately owned flats.

Since March 2025, the ground floor of the building also houses a famous Indian restaurant chain Saravanaa Bhavan, their first branch in Scotland.
