= Hillpark Secondary School =

Coordinates: 55.8154°N 4.2991°W

- Àrd-sgoil Chnoc na Pàirce (Scottish Gaelic); Hullpairk Secondary (Scots)

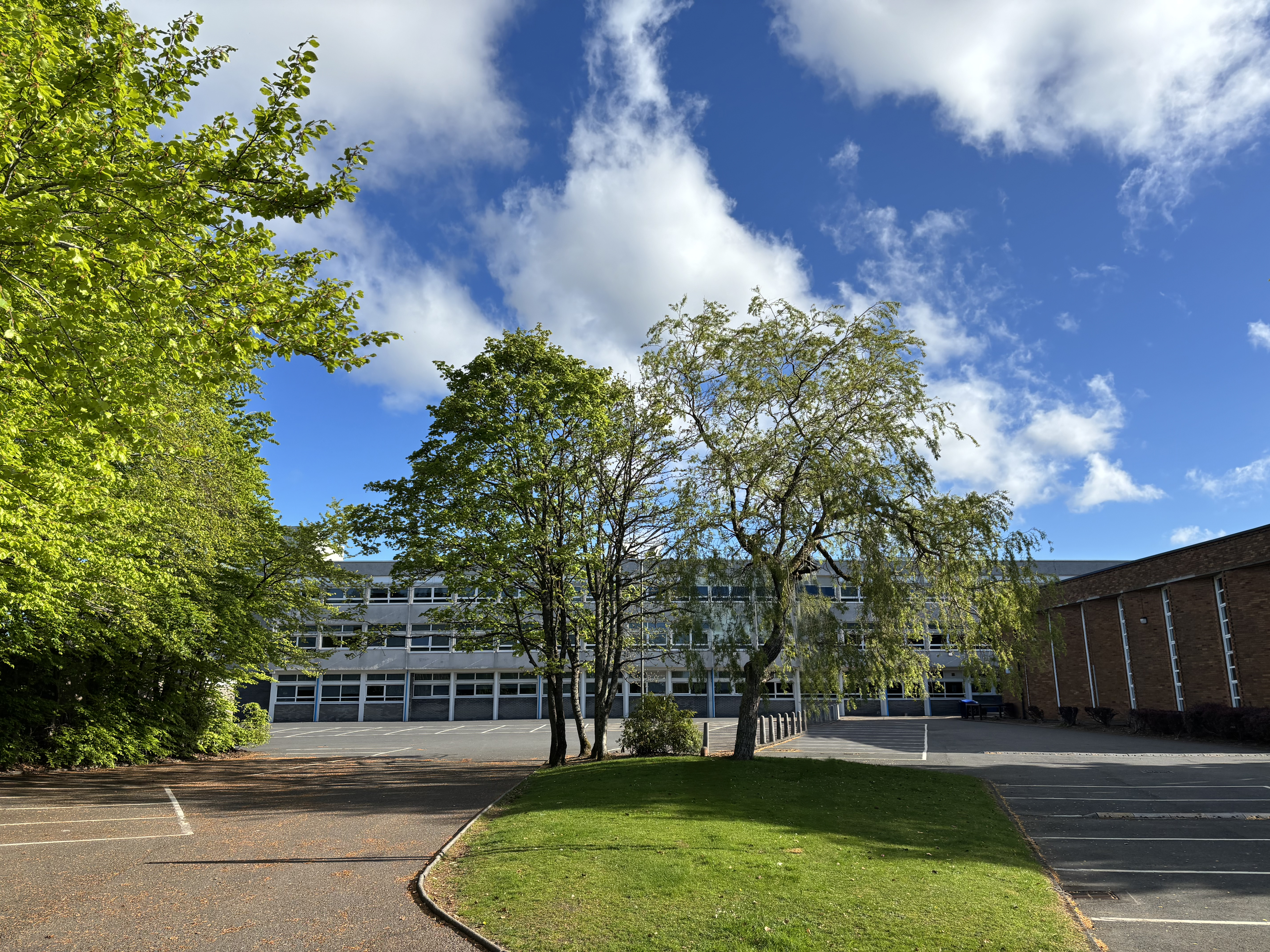

Location
- 36 Cairngorm Road; Glasgow, Lanarkshire; Scotland

Information
- School type: State Funded Secondary, (11-18)
- Motto: "Integer Vitae" (Blameless in Life)
- Established: 14 December 1967
- Headmistress: Geraldine Collins
- Gender: Coeducational
- Enrolment: 1057 (April 2022)
- Average class size: 30–1 (mostly Written) or 20–1 (mostly Practical)
- Houses: Cairngorm; Pentland; Nevis; Merrick; Lomond; Jura
Colour
Junior Tie
Senior Tie
- COVID-19 cases: 360 (April 2022)
- Website: http://www.hillpark-sec.glasgow.sch.uk

Hillpark Secondary School (Scottish Gaelic: Àrd-sgoil Chnoc na Pàirce [aːɾʲt̪skɔl xnɔkʲ na pʰaːɾʲç], Scots: Hullpairk Secondary) is a non-denominational secondary school located at 36 Cairngorm Road in the south side of Glasgow, Scotland.

The school is one of 38 secondary schools in the Glasgow City Council area, and is named after the area in which the school is situated.

== History ==
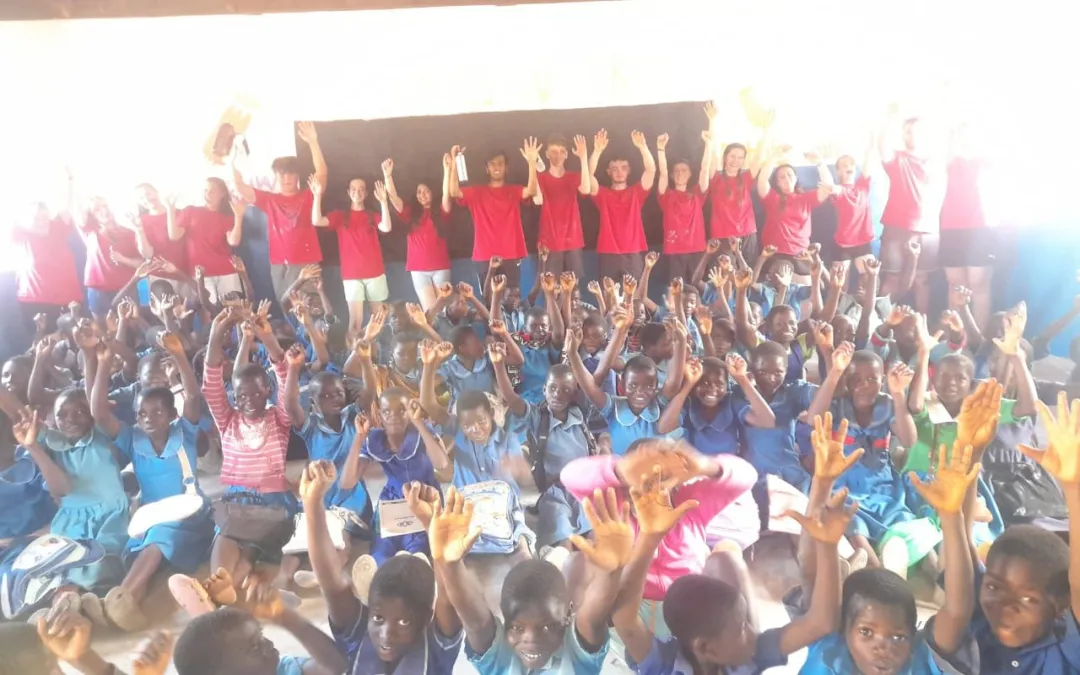
Hillpark Secondary school at Chilangoma primary school in Chileka

Hillpark was created from the merger of two schools, Sir John Maxwell Secondary School and Strathbungo Secondary School. The building opened in 1967.

From 1987 to 2006, Hillpark had a Gaelic unit providing Gaelic medium education to pupils. This existed until the opening of the Glasgow Gaelic School.

In 2023 students from the school went to visit and assist Chilangoma primary school in Chileka in Malawi in support of a Classrooms for Malawi project.

== Facilities ==
The school has a swimming pool, fitness suite, football pitch, games hall, library and a drama studio. There are also eight computer labs.

A significant feature of the school is the Autism Unit, also known as the Language and Communication Resource (LCR). Pupils identified as having an autism spectrum disorder are predominantly taught within mainstream classes with the support of LCR staff.

== Notable pupils ==
- Calum MacLeod (born 1988), cricketer
- Limmy (born 1974), comedian
