= Sauchiehall Street =

Shopping street in Glasgow city centre

Coordinates: 55.86557°N 4.26409°W

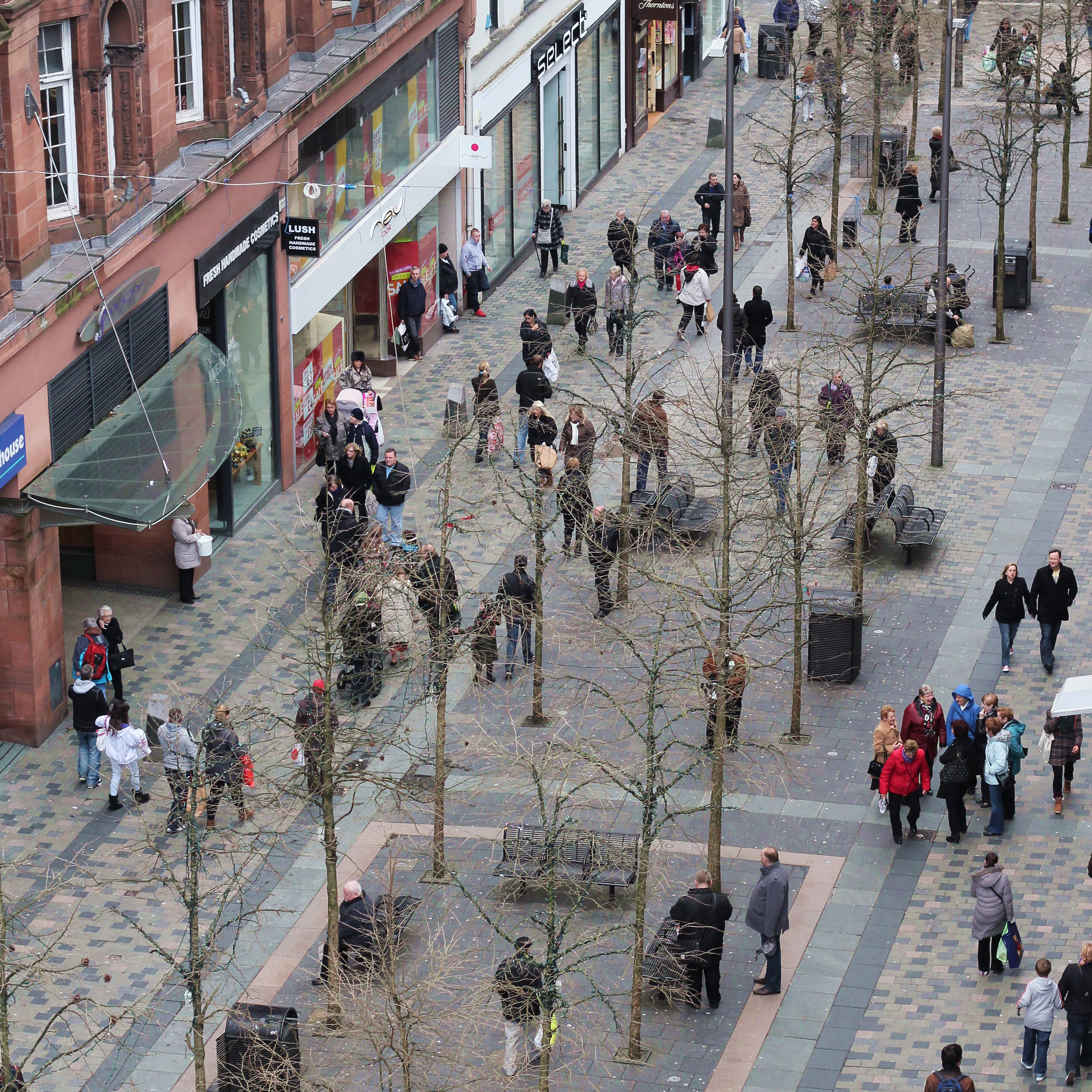
- , Sauchiehall Street looking eastwards from carpark location
- Interactive map of Sauchiehall Street
- Former names: Sauchie-haugh Road; Sandyford Street (western section, until 1900s)
- Type: Commercial/Transport
- Maintained by: Glasgow City Council; Transport Scotland
- Length: 2.5 km (1.6 mi); 11.7º from east-west
- Location: Glasgow
- Postal code: G2 3 / G3 7
- Nearest Glasgow Subway station: Buchanan Street subway station

Other
- Known for: Buchanan Galleries, Cameron Memorial Fountain, Glasgow Royal Concert Hall, St Andrew House, Glasgow, Cineworld, Glasgow, Willow Tearooms, Glasgow Film Theatre, Glasgow School of Art, Glasgow Dental Hospital and School, Beresford Hotel, King's Theatre, Glasgow, The Garage, Glasgow

Sauchiehall Street (/ˌsɔːkɪˈhɔːl, ˌsɒkɪ-, ˈsɔːkɪhɔːl, ˈsɒkɪ-/) became one of the main shopping streets in the city centre of Glasgow, Scotland, along with Buchanan Street and Argyle Street.

Starting in the city centre, Sauchiehall Street is over 1.5 miles (2.4 km) in length. At its central west end is Charing Cross, followed by the Category-A listed crescents and terraces which lead up to Park Circus, finally meeting Argyle Street in the West End in front of Kelvingrove Park and the Kelvingrove Museum, where they merge to form Dumbarton Road, continuing through Partick.

== Name ==
Sauchiehall is a corruption of the Scots sauchie hauch; sauchie "abounding in willows" and hauch "river-meadow; level ground beside a river". Hauch can be mistaken for the Scots haw, pronounced the same, meaning hall.

== History ==
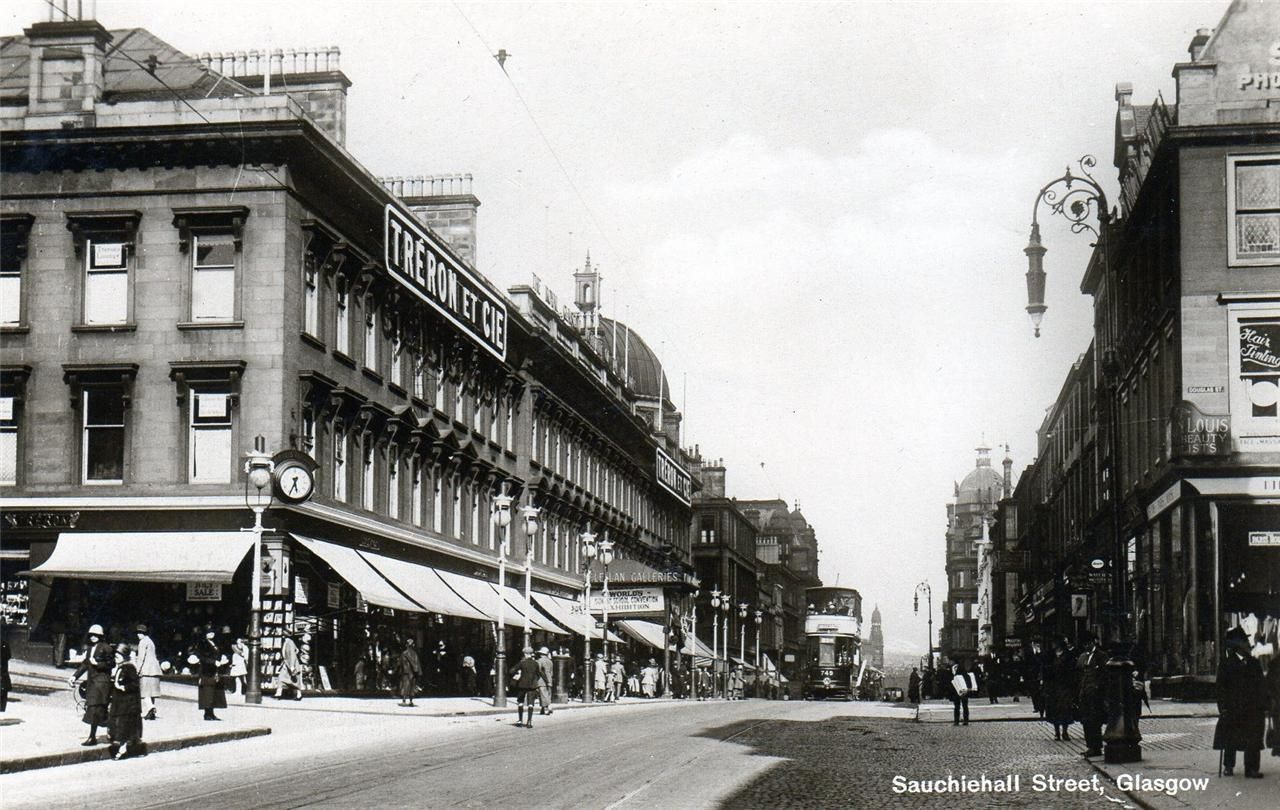
Sauchiehall Street, Glasgow at the McLellan Galleries about 1920

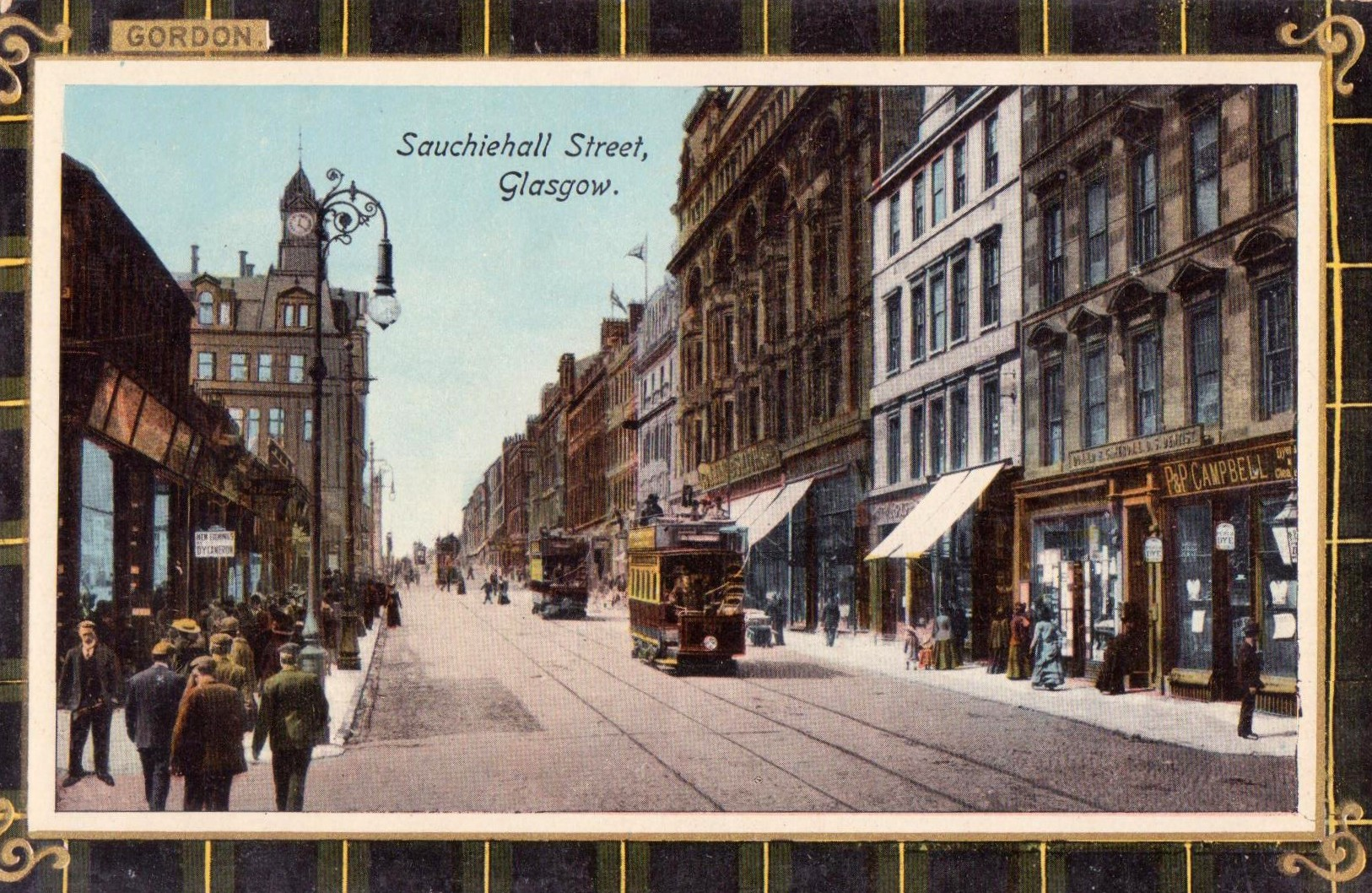
Sauchiehall Street, c. 1910

At its height, from 1880 to the 1970s, Sauchiehall Street was one of the most famous streets in Glasgow, and known internationally, due to its panoply of entertainment venues, galleries and high quality stores. The desire of wealthy merchants from 1800 onwards to own property on the outskirts of the city meant that Blythswood Hill and Garnethill started to be developed as part of the 'New Town of Blythswood'. Its first major developer was William Harley of Bath Street fame, who purchased, planned and developed 35 acres of land immediately west of Buchanan Street and also created Blythswood Square in the 1800s onwards. As a consequence, the meandering country road from the cathedral to Partick through the willows, and between these hills, acquired the name of the Saughie-haugh road. The first terraces of townhouses were built next to the road in the 1810s by William Harley. After it was widened in the 1840s it was named Sauchiehall Street and attracted more villas, tenement housing from 1860s, shops and eventually offices. A few of the original villas remained as of 1896, and lastly the 1960s, according to the Ordnance Survey map of Central Glasgow.

Over time, the street became home to a number of notable buildings, including the McLellan Galleries from 1856 onwards. And the Glasgow Empire Theatre which was opened in 1897 at 31–35 Sauchiehall Street. The theatre played host to big names such as Bob Hope, Frank Sinatra, Judy Garland, Dorothy Lamour, Jack Benny and Danny Kaye before it closed on 31 March 1963. The Royalty Theatre was also situated on Sauchiehall Street, opening in 1879 and showing operas, comedies and plays up until its lease ran out in 1913. Afterwards, during the First World War, it was purchased by the YMCA to become a hostel for soldiers and sailors. The building lived out the rest of its days after the war as the Lyric Theatre, before it was demolished in the late 1950s.

By the early 1900s the street contained theatres, picture houses, ballrooms, clubs, hotels, restaurants, art galleries and departmental stores such as Pettigrew & Stephens, Copland & Lye, Trerons, with theatres in adjacent streets, including the Kings Theatre in Bath Street, Theatre Royal in Hope Street and the Pavilion Theatre, in Renfield Street, and Glasgow Art School in Renfrew Street.

Glasgow's first "skyscraper", the Art Deco style Beresford Hotel, was built further along Sauchiehall Street in 1938 for the Empire Exhibition, Scotland 1938. It later became offices for ICI and then a hall of residence for Strathclyde University before being converted into private apartments. Its "moderne" architecture was novel when it was built and the original mustard-coloured stonework with red fins was rather unkindly described as "custard and rhubarb architecture".

In 2014 Sauchiehall Street was the subject of the documentary TV series The Street.

=== Public Realm ===
Spread over ten years to 2026 Glasgow City Council initiated a public realm project as Sauchiehall Street Avenue, including in the part from Charing Cross to Rose Street creating a multifunctional service verge, two-way cycle lane, two lane carriageway along with plantation of trees, shrubs and free wireless internet through the street.

== City centre section ==
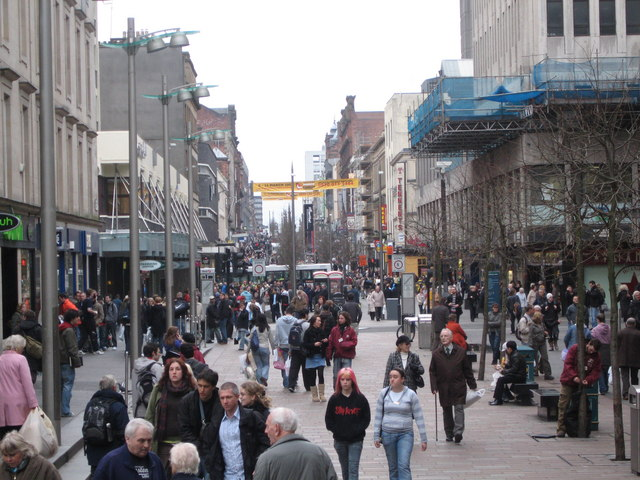
Sauchiehall Street looking westwards

At the eastern end of Sauchiehall Street is the Glasgow Royal Concert Hall and Buchanan Galleries, one of the largest city centre redevelopments in the UK. Sauchiehall Street formerly linked directly to Parliamentary Road at its eastern end, which continued through Townhead to the Glasgow Royal Infirmary.

The section from West Nile Street to Rose Street was pedestrianised in 1972, with the easternmost part, linking to Buchanan Street, pedestrianised in 1978. The central part of the street consists of remaining retailers, the McLellan Galleries and the Willow Tearooms, designed in 1903 by Charles Rennie Mackintosh, which has been restored to its original artistic designs and is open to the public as a tea room, restaurant and Mackintosh venue centre. Nearby in Renfrew Street is the Royal Conservatoire of Scotland.

== Clubs and museums ==
At the western end of the city centre section of the street, towards Charing Cross, there are restaurants, bars and student-oriented clubs. Landmarks in this area of the street, or near to it, include the former Beresford Hotel, Glasgow School of Art in Renfrew Street, the Glasgow Film Theatre in Rose Street, CCA Glasgow, the McLellan Galleries, the Royal Highland Fusiliers Museum and the Glasgow Dental Hospital and School.
