= Pollokshaws =

Coordinates: 55.825183°N 4.294727°W

Pollokshaws: Scots: Powkshaws
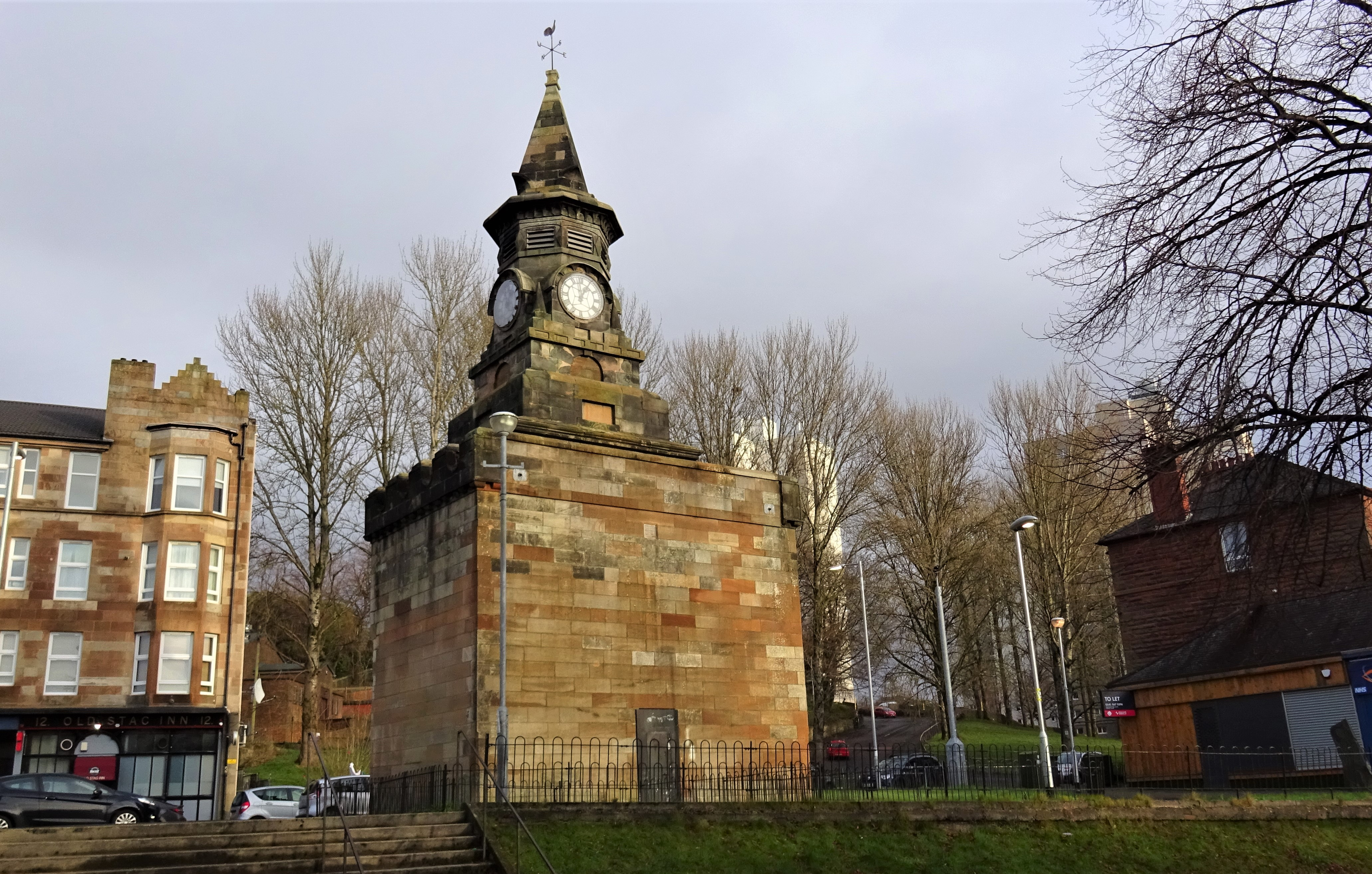
- Pollokshaws Clock Tower

- Location within Glasgow
- Population: 14,295
- OS grid reference: NS562614
- Community council: Pollokshaws and Eastwood
- Council area: Glasgow City Council
- Lieutenancy area: Glasgow
- Country: Scotland
- Sovereign state: United Kingdom
- Post town: GLASGOW
- Postcode district: G43 1
- Dialling code: 0141
- Police: Scotland
- Fire: Scottish
- Ambulance: Scottish
- UK Parliament: Glasgow South
- Scottish Parliament: Glasgow Cathcart

Pollokshaws (Scots: Powkshaws) is an area on the South side of the city of Glasgow, Scotland. It is bordered by the residential neighbourhoods of Auldhouse to the east, Eastwood and Hillpark to the south and Shawlands to the north, with the Glasgow South Western Line railway and the open lands of Pollok Country Park to the west. The White Cart Water flows through the area.

The housing stock consists of some sandstone tenement housing, modern brick tenement-style buildings, low-rise social housing and high rise/multi-storey tower blocks. Previously eight tower blocks stood in an area known as the Shawbridge Corridor; the last of these blocks was demolished in March 2016. Four other tower blocks remain, near Pollokshaws East railway station.

According to the 2001 Census, Pollokshaws had a population of 4,295. Its residents are a mixture of working class and middle class social groups, and the area also had a large South Asian community.

== History ==
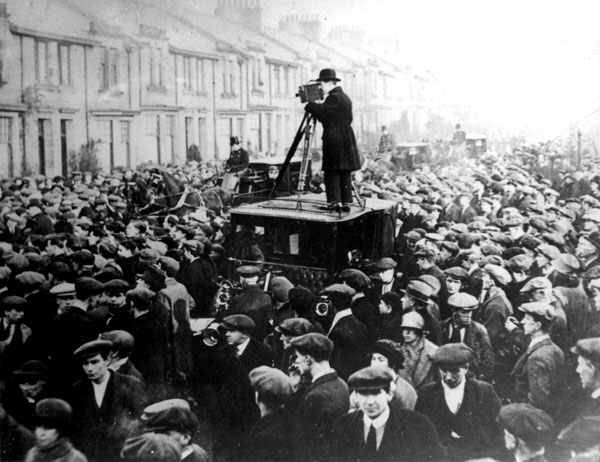
John Maclean's casket being removed from his Pollokshaws home in November 1923

Pollokshaws was originally a village predominantly dedicated to weaving in the 17th century. A group of Flemish weavers were brought to the area in the 19th century by the landowners, the Maxwells of Pollok, on account of their exceptional weaving skills.

Pollokshaws was granted a charter to become a Burgh of Barony in 1812. It became a police burgh in 1858 and remained a burgh of Renfrewshire until 1912 when it was annexed to the City of Glasgow. Though it had been an industrial area, this changed in 1957 when it was proposed as the second Comprehensive Development Area in Glasgow (the first was Hutchesontown). The area was demolished and rebuilt anew.

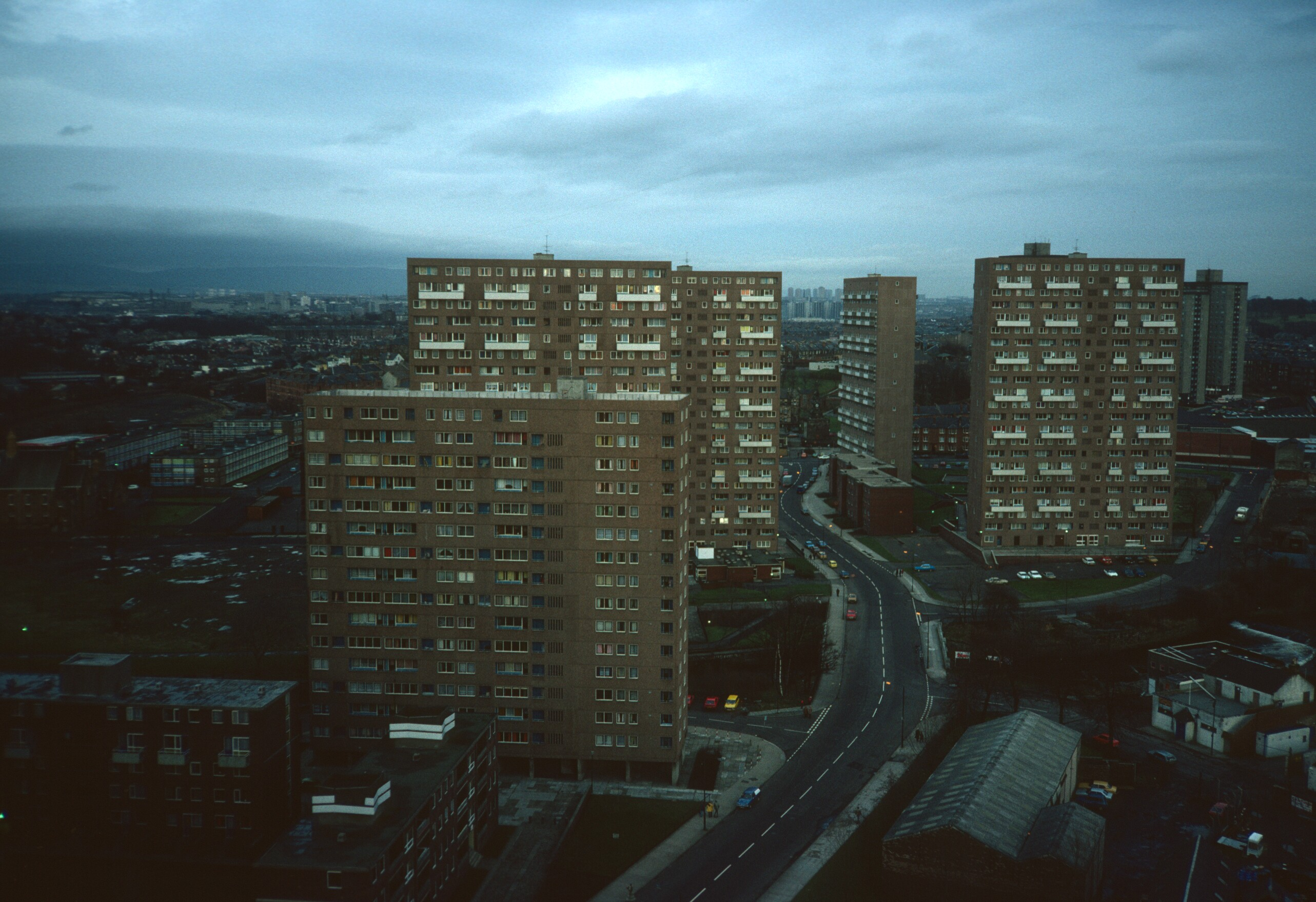
View over tower blocks in the Shawbridge area, 1983

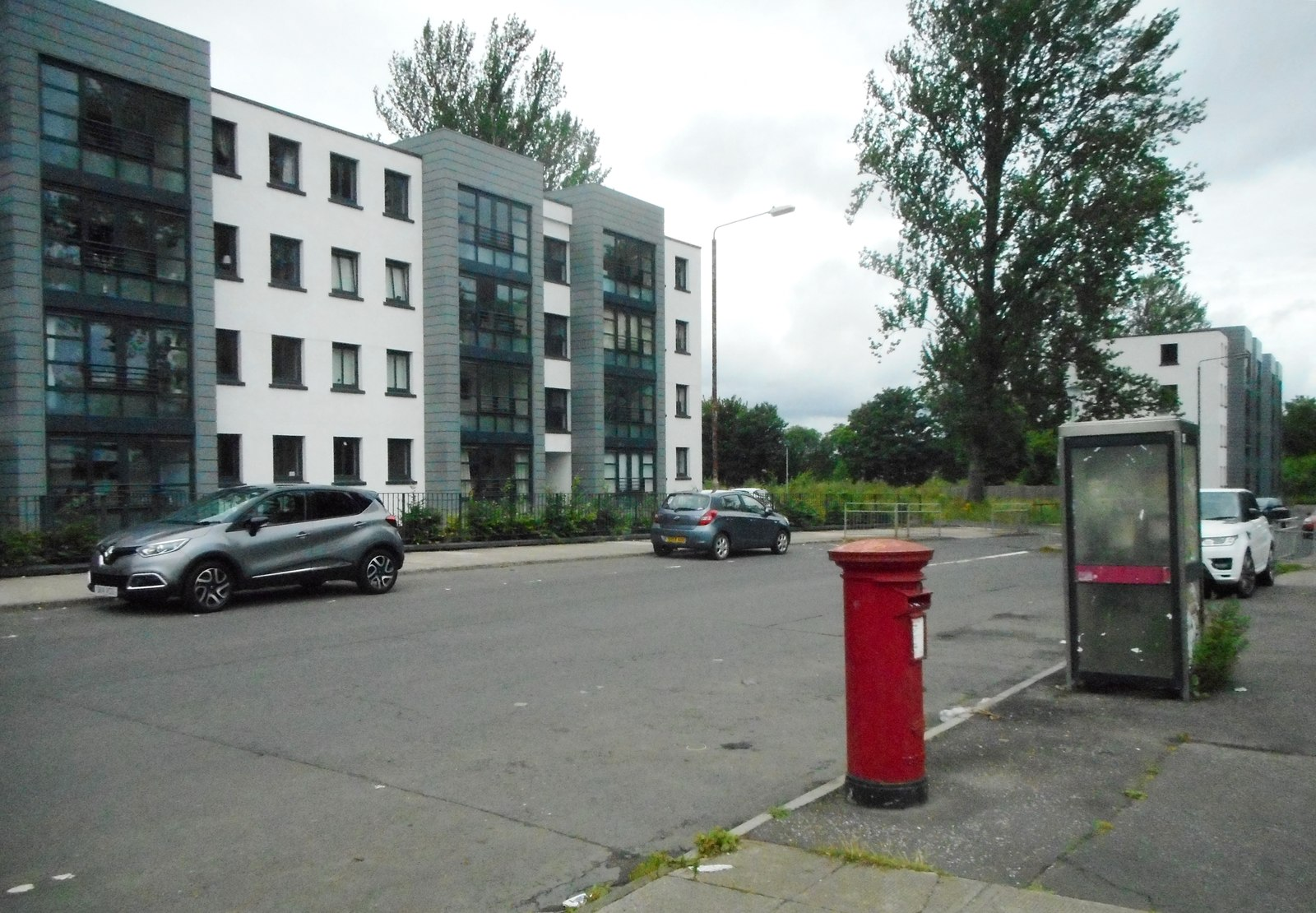
New apartments in the same area, 2017

Several residential tower blocks were built as part of the CDA plan in the 1960s. Most of these were later demolished between 2008 and 2016 in the Shawbridge Corridor regeneration. The blowdowns of the first two towers in July 2008 was filmed in detail by an American company and can be seen as part of the documentary series "The Detonators". Low-rise, mainly private housing has replaced the blocks. A group of four towers at Shawhill remain standing going into the 2020s, along with a single block at Cartcraigs on the southern periphery of the district.

== Landmarks ==
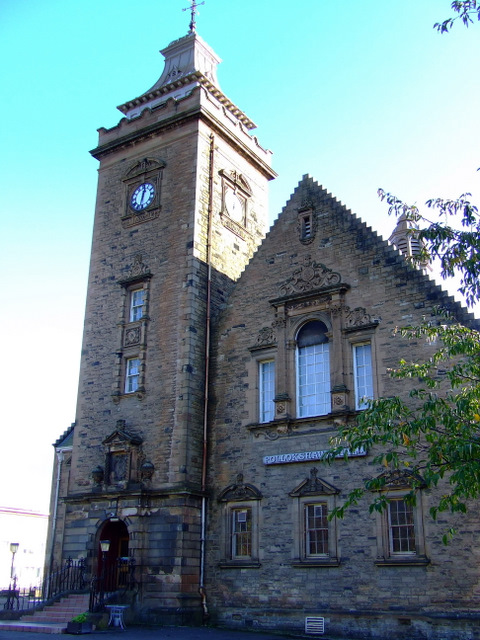
Pollokshaws Burgh Hall

Pollokshaws Burgh Hall on Pollokshaws Road, built in 1895–98 by architect Robert Rowand Anderson in the Scots renaissance style, was originally the municipal headquarters of the independent burgh before passing into the ownership of Glasgow Corporation following annexation. Now a Category A listed building, it was closed by the council in the 1990s but subsequently reopened for community use by a charitable trust.

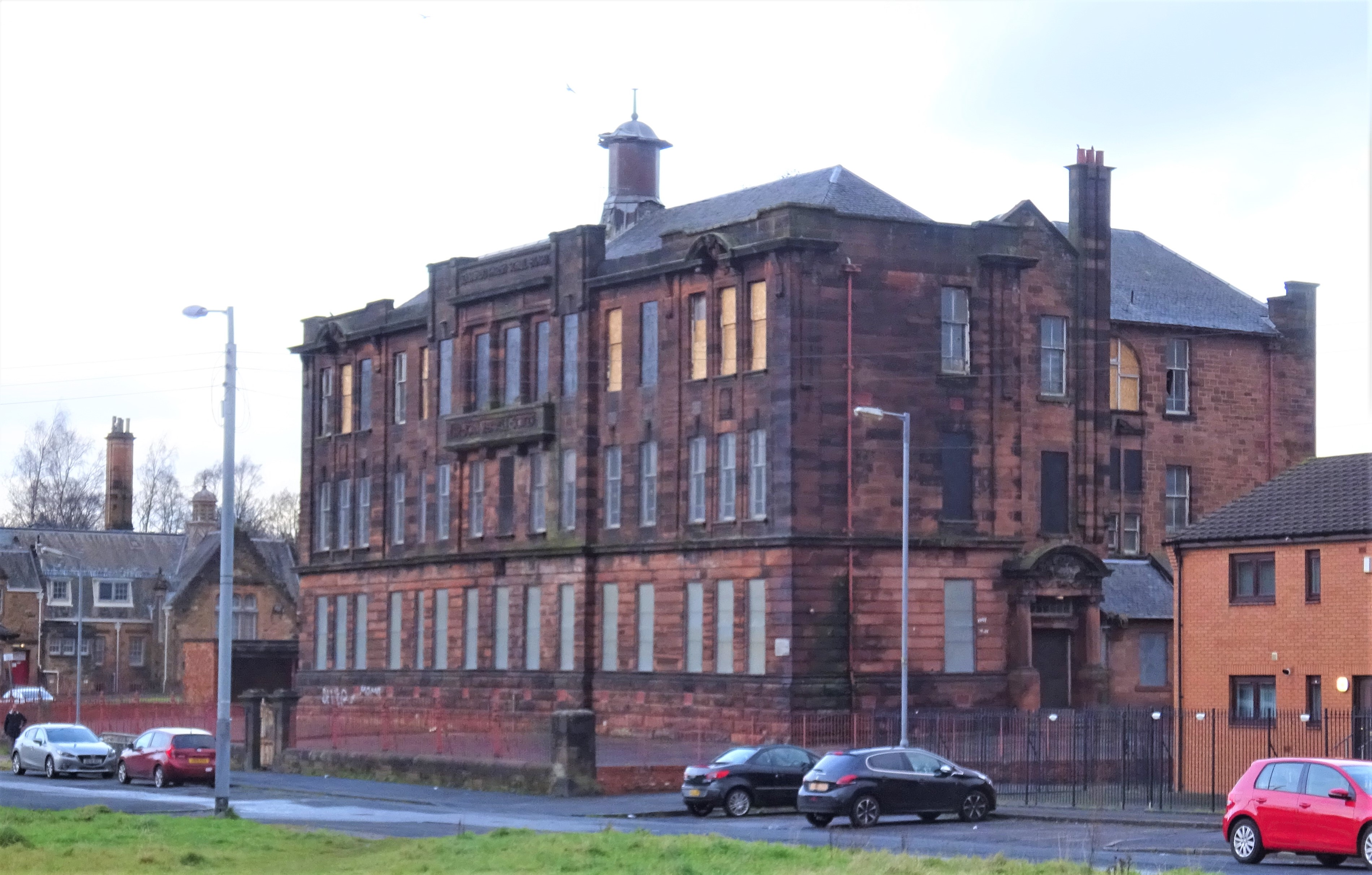
Sir John Maxwell School (2019

Sir John Stirling Maxwell Primary School, located on Bengal Street / Christian Street, was a standalone red sandstone building by architect John H Hamilton, completed in 1907. The site of the school was previously donated by local philanthropic landowner Sir John Stirling Maxwell, after whom it was named. The school was closed in June 2011 and despite local pressure and campaigns the building was allowed to rot and stood derelict for some years. It was demolished in 2023 after being deemed structurally unsafe beyond repair, with the council promising to save and re-use some of its features in a future project.

Pollokshaws Clock Tower, located on Pleasance Street, is the surviving part of the old Town House, built in 1803. There was a ground-floor school with a court-room and a police cell above it. From 1818, the Town House building also housed a library. The Pollokshaws Burgh Charter empowered the council to hold courts for the trial both of civil actions and criminal offences. A jail to incarcerate local wrongdoers was built in 1845. After the 1912 annexation of Pollokshaws Burgh to the City of Glasgow, most of the Town House was demolished and only a public campaign managed to save the remaining Clock Tower.

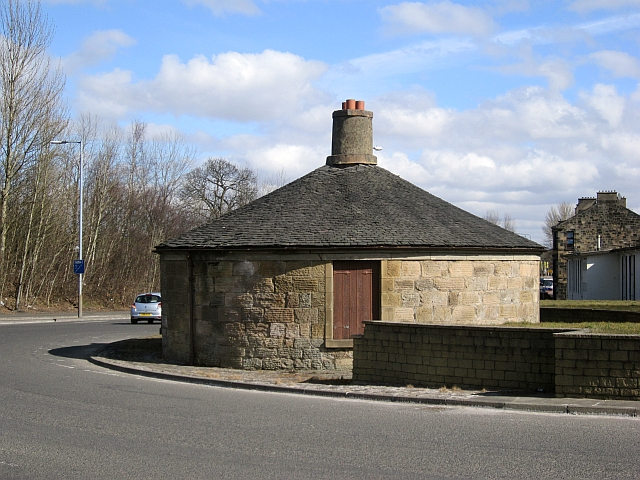
Round Toll on roundabout

The Round Toll is a circular building now located on the central island of the roundabout of the same name (junction of B762 Barrhead Road / Nether Auldhouse Road and B769 Pollokshaws Road / Thornliebank Road). Built around 1820 as a tollbooth, it is the only surviving example of this type of building in the area, others having been lost to road development, and a rare example of an older building in Pollokshaws following 20th century slum clearance and redevelopment. It is now Category B listed. Following the abolition of road tolls in the 1880s it served as a carriage hire premises, a pub, and latterly as a private house up until the 1950s. It was subsequently used for council storage but is now vacant and isolated on the roundabout.

Pollokshaws Parish Church is a B listed 19th century, dating to 1843. In December 2025, the church was heavily damaged in a fire.

== Sport ==
Pollokshaws Bowling Club was formed in 1854 and was originally across from Pollokshaws West railway station. On the club's centenary, the clubhouse and greens moved into Pollok Park rent free thanks to Sir John Stirling Maxwell.

The Pollokshaws Races, an informal horse racing event staged annually from around 1750 until 1883, took place on a racecourse to the southwest of the village, on land now occupied by Kennishead Road and Cowglen Golf Club. The races initially developed in conjunction with the local holiday, the Pollokshaws Fair, and were viewed more as an excuse for drinking and socialising rather than a serious sporting event.

Pollok F.C.'s Newlandsfield Park is in the area, adjacent to Pollokshaws East railway station.

== Notable people ==
- Frankie Boyle - comedian
- Elizabeth 'Betty' Burns - Illegitimate daughter of Robert Burns is buried in the Kirk Lane Cemetery.
- Jack McLean, Glasgow columnist
- John MacLean - early 20th century socialist
- Alex Norton - actor
- James Maxton - political activist
- James Tassie - 18th century gem engraver

== See also ==
- Glasgow tower blocks
