= Carnwadric =

Residential area of Glasgow, Scotland

Coordinates: 55.808590°N 4.323209°W

Carnwadric: Scottish Gaelic: A' Chloch; Scots: Carndouk
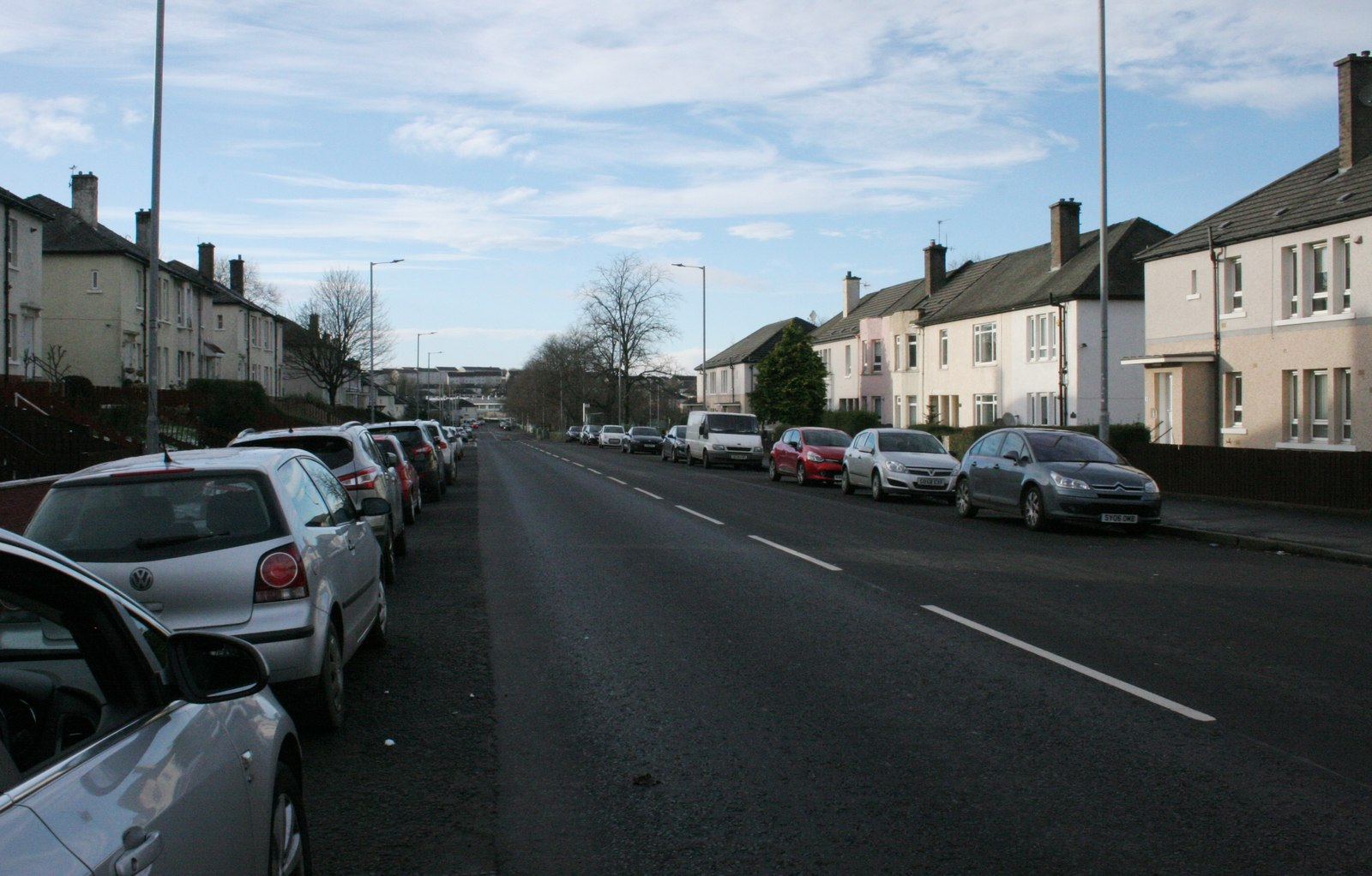
- Boydstone Road

- Location within Glasgow
- OS grid reference: NS545597
- Council area: Glasgow City Council
- Lieutenancy area: Glasgow
- Country: Scotland
- Sovereign state: United Kingdom
- Post town: GLASGOW
- Postcode district: G46
- Dialling code: 0141
- Police: Scotland
- Fire: Scottish
- Ambulance: Scottish
- UK Parliament: Glasgow South
- Scottish Parliament: Glasgow Cathcart and Pollok

Carnwadric is a residential area of Glasgow, Scotland. It is situated south of the River Clyde, and is bordered by a park to the north (King George V Park, on the other side of which is the Kennishead neighbourhood), the Arden housing estate to the west, by the village of Thornliebank (East Renfrewshire) to the south and by the Auldhouse Burn to the east.

== History ==
Carnwadric was a farm owned by Sir John Maxwell, one of approximately seven such large holdings owned by him and rented to others. It used to be called "Carnwatherick". Pollokshaws and Thornliebank are the nearest ancient villages and were created mainly because of the textile industry. Manufacturing and printing of cloth were the main industries and formed the livelihoods of many of the villagers. Several immigrants came to the area to work in the industry: Irish linen workers, as well as Dutch workers specialized in beetling (a form of transfer printing).

Building of the neighbourhood commenced in 1927 and the estate was opened in 1932. Adjoining Arden, the houses in Carnwadric are older and sturdier than those found in later 1950s social housing and are mostly brick and masonry.

The two and three story housing on Crebar Street, Hopeman Street, Hopeman Rd and Carnwardric Road were built in the 1970s.

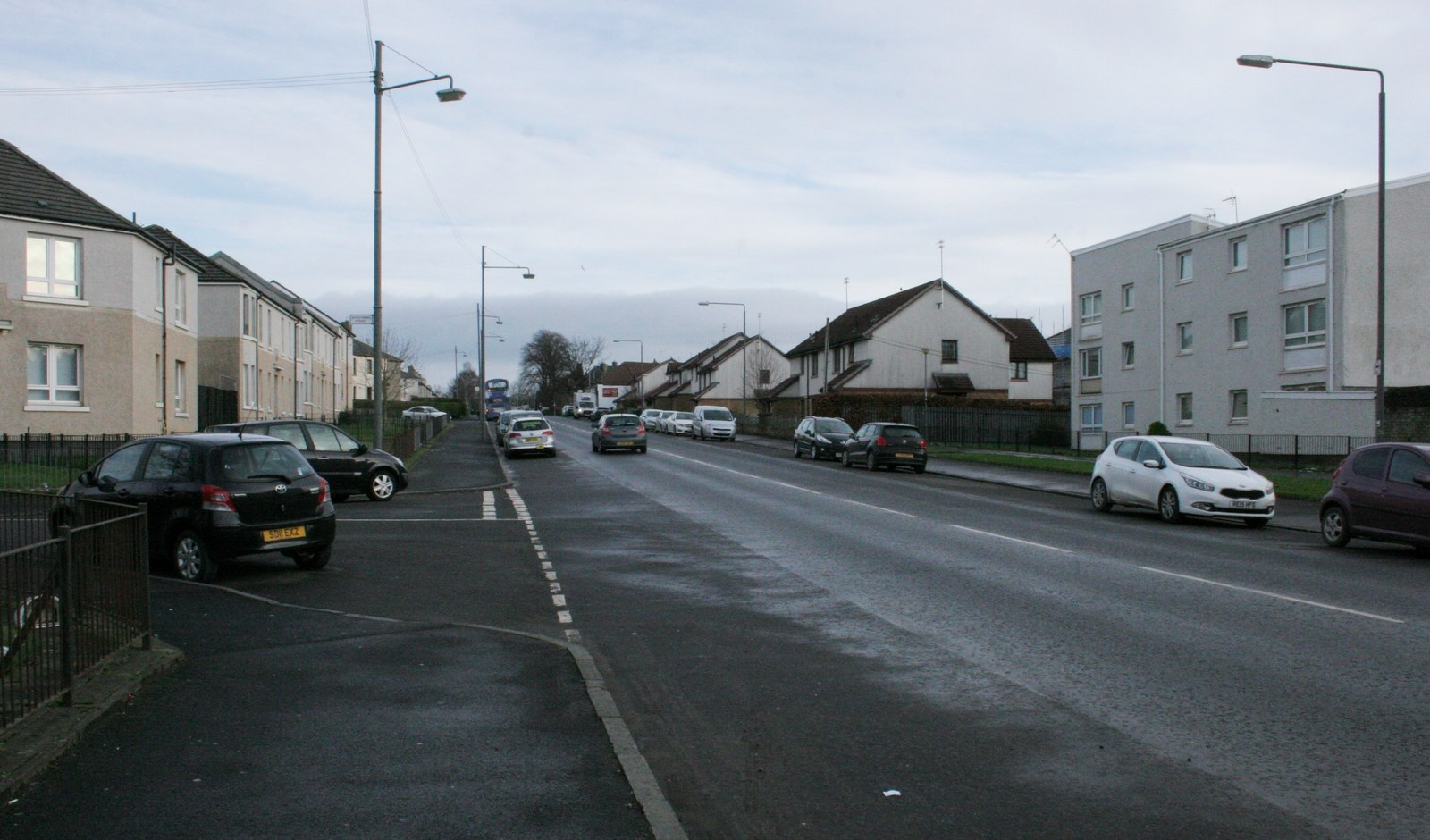
Lochiel Road looking east, with Carnwadric houses on the left, while those on the right fall under Thornliebank

The scheme had a temporary timber school located on Crebar Street, known by its pupils as 'The Widden School' or 'The Shack', it served the local children from 1932 until April 1939 when the brick Carnwadric Public School opened. Carnwadric Church was opened 19 September 1952. As of 2009, Carnwadric had only has one school, the Roman Catholic St. Vincent's Primary, it was recently demolished and remodeled after merging with Arden's St Louise's Primary. Carnwadric Primary, the area's former public school (opened on 28 April 1939) was closed and merged with Arden Primary as a newly built merger school called "Ashpark Primary School" (located in Arden). The site of the former Carnwadric Primary was used for new housing; the school's boundary walls were kept and used as part of the new development.

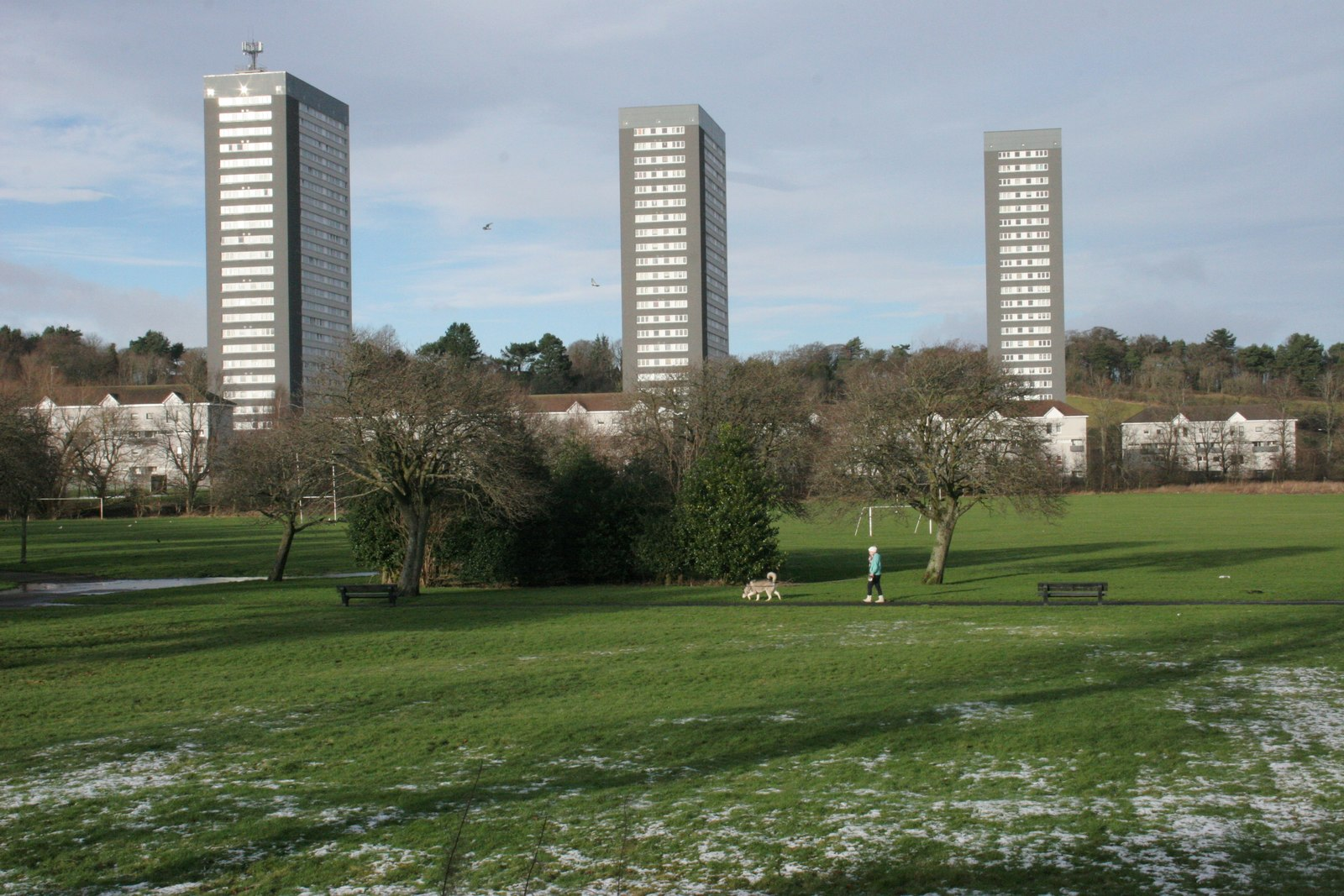
View north from Carnwadric across King George V towards Kennishead tower blocks

Carnwadric has a public playground named King George V Park. The park was opened on 28 May 1951 by Princess Elizabeth, now Queen Elizabeth II. Part of the park was sold off to Beazer Homes for access to their residential development at 'Regent's Park' which commenced in 1995.

The local retail area is in need of refurbishment and investment to return it to its 1940s and 1950s state. There are typical shops and other amenities at Thornliebank and a retail park a short drive away at Darnley which is also the access point for the M77 motorway to central Glasgow. Kennishead and Thornliebank railway stations are located at the western and eastern ends of Boystone Road respectively.

== Notable residents ==
- Brian "Limmy" Limond, comedian, grew up in Carnwadric and attended Carnwadric Primary School
- Bobby Wellins, tenor saxophonist
