= Crossmyloof railway station =

Railway station in Glasgow, Scotland

Crossmyloof Scottish Gaelic: Crois MoLiubha
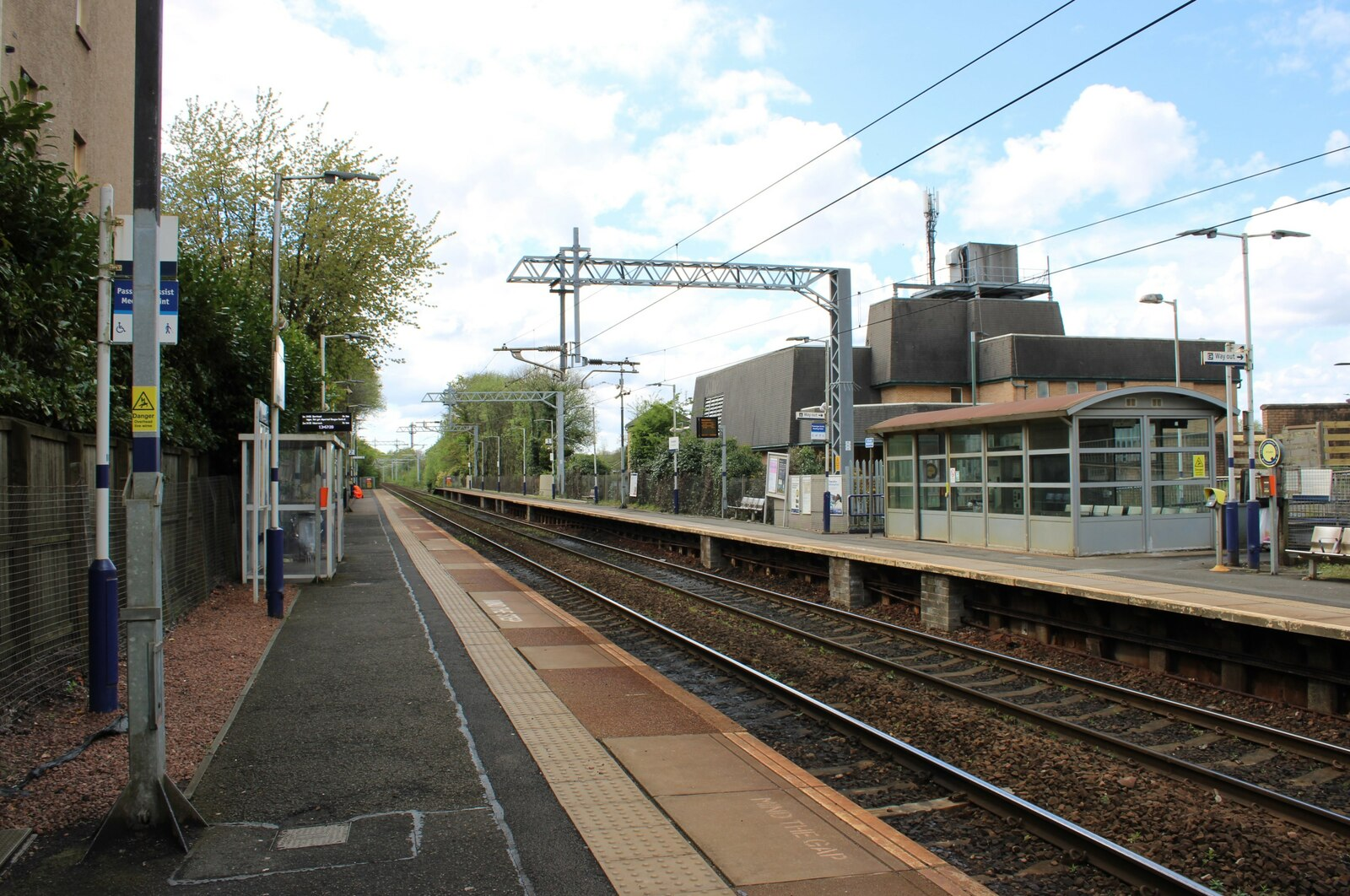
- The station in 2025

General information
- Location: Crossmyloof, Glasgow City; Scotland
- Coordinates: 55.8338°N 4.2847°W
- Grid reference: NS570624
- Manager: ScotRail
- Transit authority: SPT
- Platforms: 2

Other information
- Station code: CMY
- Fare zone: 1

History
- Original company: Glasgow, Barrhead and Kilmarnock Joint Railway

Key dates
- 1 June 1888: Opened

Passengers
- 2020/21: ▼0.214 million
- 2021/22: ▲0.474 million
- 2022/23: ▲0.617 million
- 2023/24: ▲0.746 million
- 2024/25: ▼0.710 million
Location
- Location within Glasgow council area
Notes
- Passenger statistics from the Office of Rail and Road

Crossmyloof railway station is a railway station serving the areas of Crossmyloof and Shawlands in Glasgow, Scotland, located 1 mile 60 chains (2.8 km) from Glasgow Central. The station is managed by ScotRail and is served by trains on the Glasgow South Western Line.

The station was renovated in the 1990s, during which an overline station building was demolished. The overbridge (Titwood Road) was rebuilt in 2006.

On 6 October 2012, a Highland cow escaped the nearby Pollok Country Park and walked the rail line to this station, where it was captured and returned.

== Services ==
The station is served by trains on both the East Kilbride and Barrhead lines, with a half-hourly frequency to each (one Barrhead service per hour extends to Kilmarnock, with 1 per day extended to Dumfries). This gives the station four departures each hour to Glasgow Central, these tend to be at 10, 20, 40 and 50 minutes past the hour, give or take a couple of minutes. Evening service is generally hourly to East Kilbride and Kilmarnock and 2 trains per hour to Glasgow Central.

Sundays see a half-hourly service to East Kilbride and Glasgow Central but there is no service to Barrhead or Kilmarnock. Passengers can change at Pollokshaws West for services towards Kilmarnock and stations to Carlisle

Preceding station	National Rail	Following station
Pollokshaws West	ScotRail; Glasgow South Western Line	Glasgow Central
	Historical railways	
Pollokshaws West	Caledonian and Glasgow & South Western Railways; Glasgow, Barrhead and Kilmarnock Joint Railway	Southside; 1848–1877; Station closed
Pollokshaws West	Caledonian and Glasgow & South Western Railways; Glasgow, Barrhead and Kilmarnock Joint Railway	Strathbungo; 1877–1962; Line open; station closed

== Sources ==
- Brailsford, Martyn, ed. (December 2017) [1987]. Railway Track Diagrams 1: Scotland & Isle of Man (6th ed.). Frome: Trackmaps. ISBN 978-0-9549866-9-8.
- Video and narrated history
- Butt, R. V. J. (October 1995). The Directory of Railway Stations: details every public and private passenger station, halt, platform and stopping place, past and present (1st ed.). Sparkford: Patrick Stephens Ltd. ISBN 978-1-85260-508-7. OCLC 60251199. OL 11956311M.
