= KNS =

KNS or kns may refer to:

- King Island Airport, Tasmania, Australia, IATA airport code KNS
- Kennishead railway station, Glasgow, Scotland, station code KNS
- Kensiu language, an Austro-asiatic language, ISO 639-3 code kns
- Royal Norwegian Yacht Club (Kongelig Norsk Seilforening), in Oslo, Norway
