= Shawlands =

Area of Glasgow, Scotland

Coordinates: 55.829°N 4.287°W

Shawlands: Scottish Gaelic: Fearann na Doire
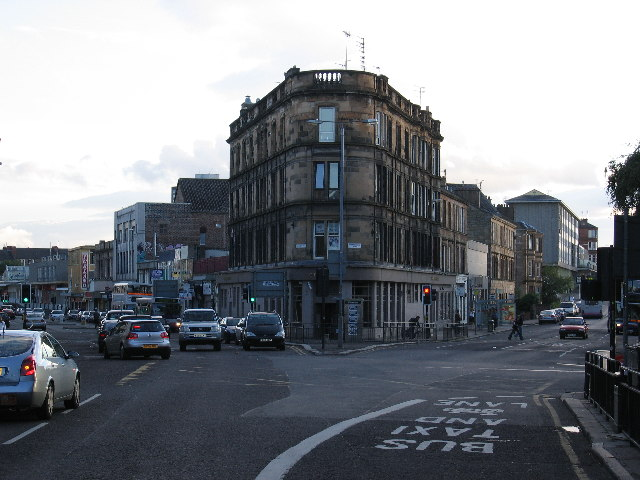
- Shawlands Cross (2005)

- Location within Glasgow
- Area: 0.52 km^{2} (0.20 sq mi)
- Population: 7,015 (2015)
  - Density: 13,490/km^{2} (34,900/sq mi)
- OS grid reference: NS567618
- Council area: Glasgow City Council
- Lieutenancy area: Glasgow
- Country: Scotland
- Sovereign state: United Kingdom
- Post town: GLASGOW
- Postcode district: G41 3
- Dialling code: 0141
- Police: Scotland
- Fire: Scottish
- Ambulance: Scottish
- UK Parliament: Glasgow South

Shawlands (Scottish Gaelic: Fearann na Doire) is a Southside suburb of Glasgow, Scotland, located two miles south of the River Clyde. The area, considered the "Heart of the Southside", is known for its independent restaurants and cafés, art scene, public parks, period terraces, and red and blond sandstone tenements. Shawlands was named one of the best places to live in Scotland in 2022 and 2023 by The Sunday Times, and one of the world's coolest neighbourhoods by Time Out Magazine with judges describing it as "the city's best area to live and socialise”. It is located between Pollok Country Park – the home of the Burrell Collection and Pollok House – and the acclaimed Victorian park Queen's Park.

== History ==
Shawlands grew rapidly during the 19th Century as Glasgow boomed during its time as the commercial powerhouse of the British Empire. Over time, the number of inhabitants in this largely artisanal and industrial area doubled due to the formation of significant local businesses, such as the Camphill Bakery, which opened in 1847. Following their rapid development, the villages of Shawlands (1819) and Cathcart (1912), which included the Crossmyloof parts of today's Shawlands Cross Conservation Area, were absorbed into Glasgow during the city’s southward extension, having previously been within the Eastwood parish in Renfrewshire.

With improving transport infrastructure and the expansion of Glasgow southwards in this period, Shawlands developed into an important commercial centre for that sector of the city. Neighbouring districts include the areas of Giffnock, Auldhouse, Crossmyloof, Strathbungo, Langside, Newlands, and Pollokshaws, with Shawlands itself overlapping two Council wards (Pollokshields and Langside) and two Scottish Parliament constituencies (Glasgow Cathcart and Glasgow Southside).

== Cultural heritage ==
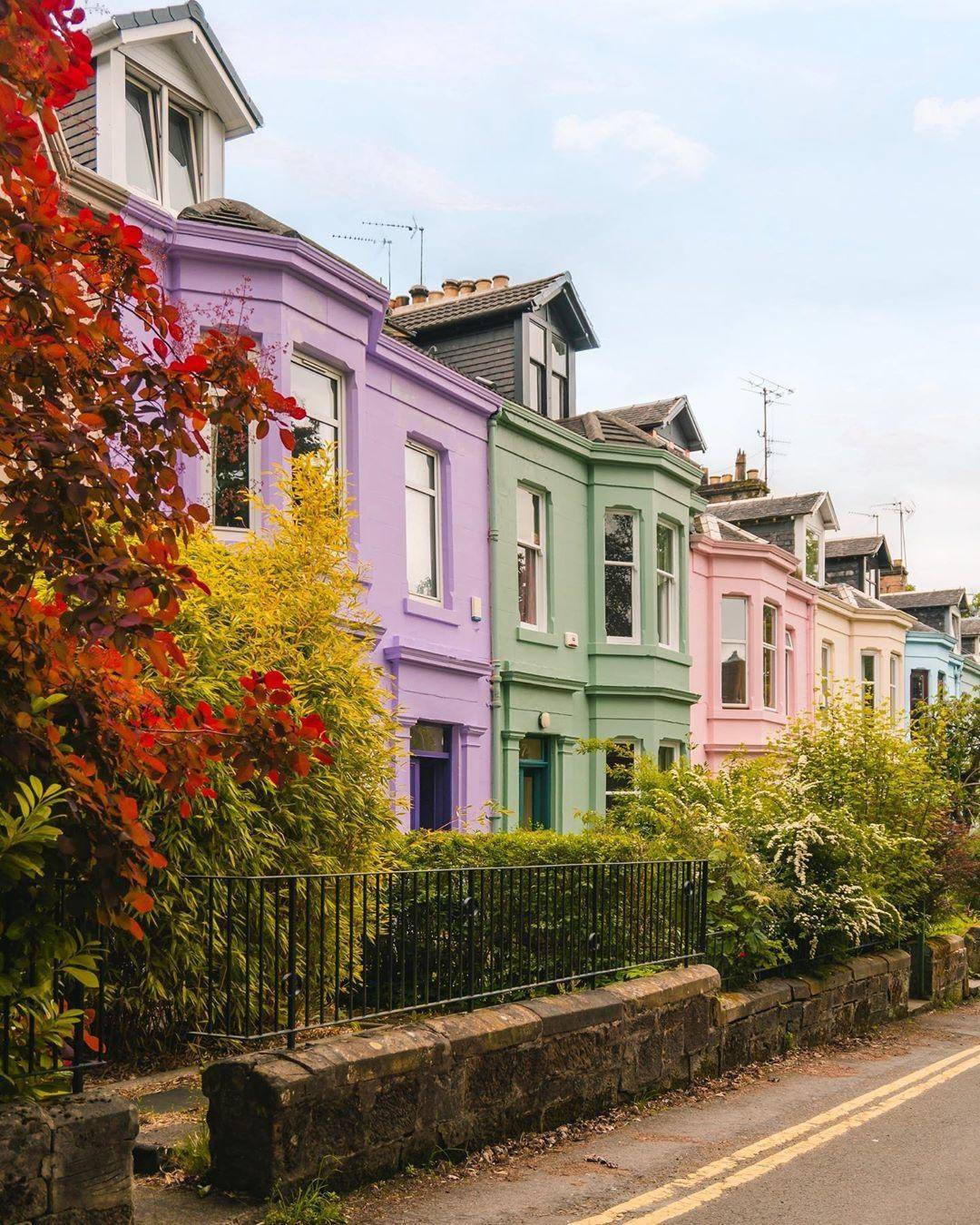
Painted townhouses on Blairhall Avenue

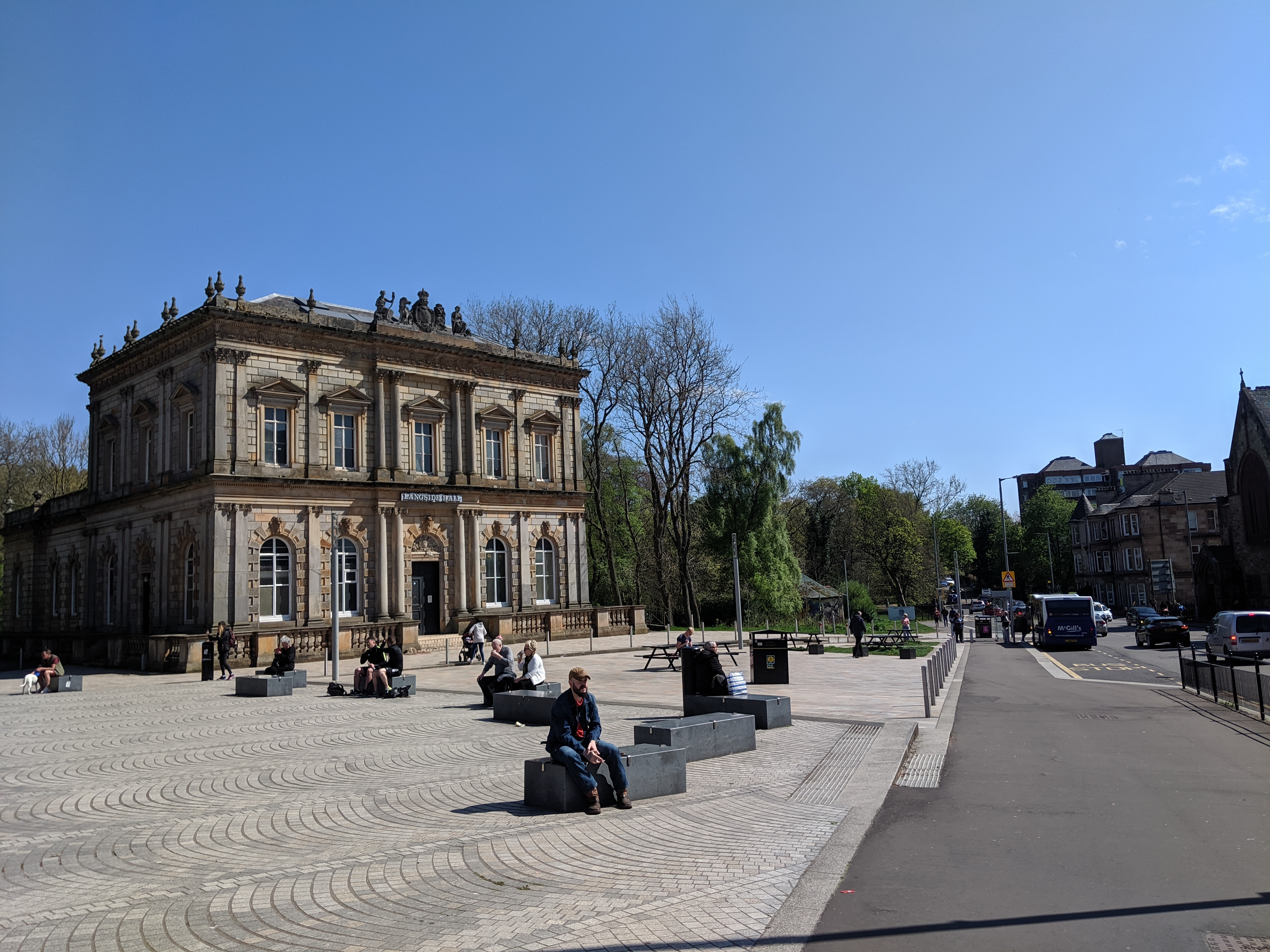
Langside Hall, April 2022

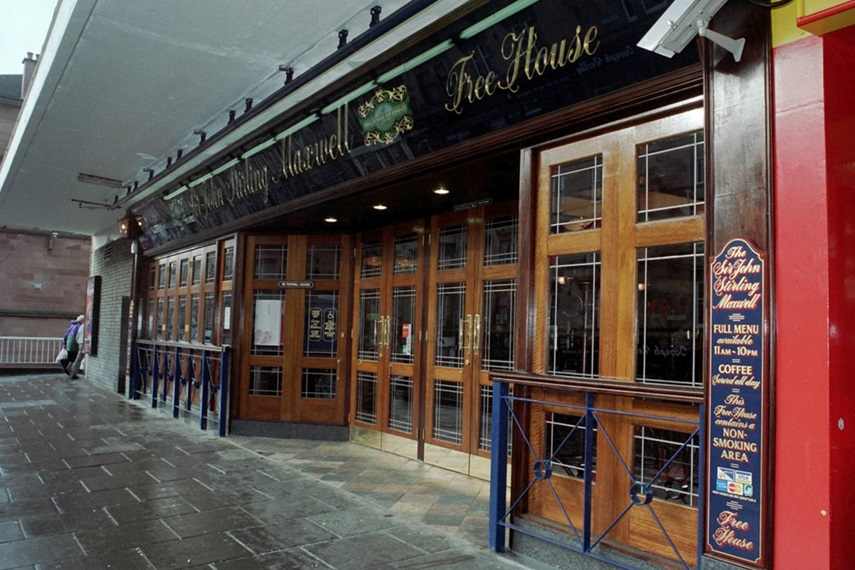
Sir John Stirling Maxwell pub

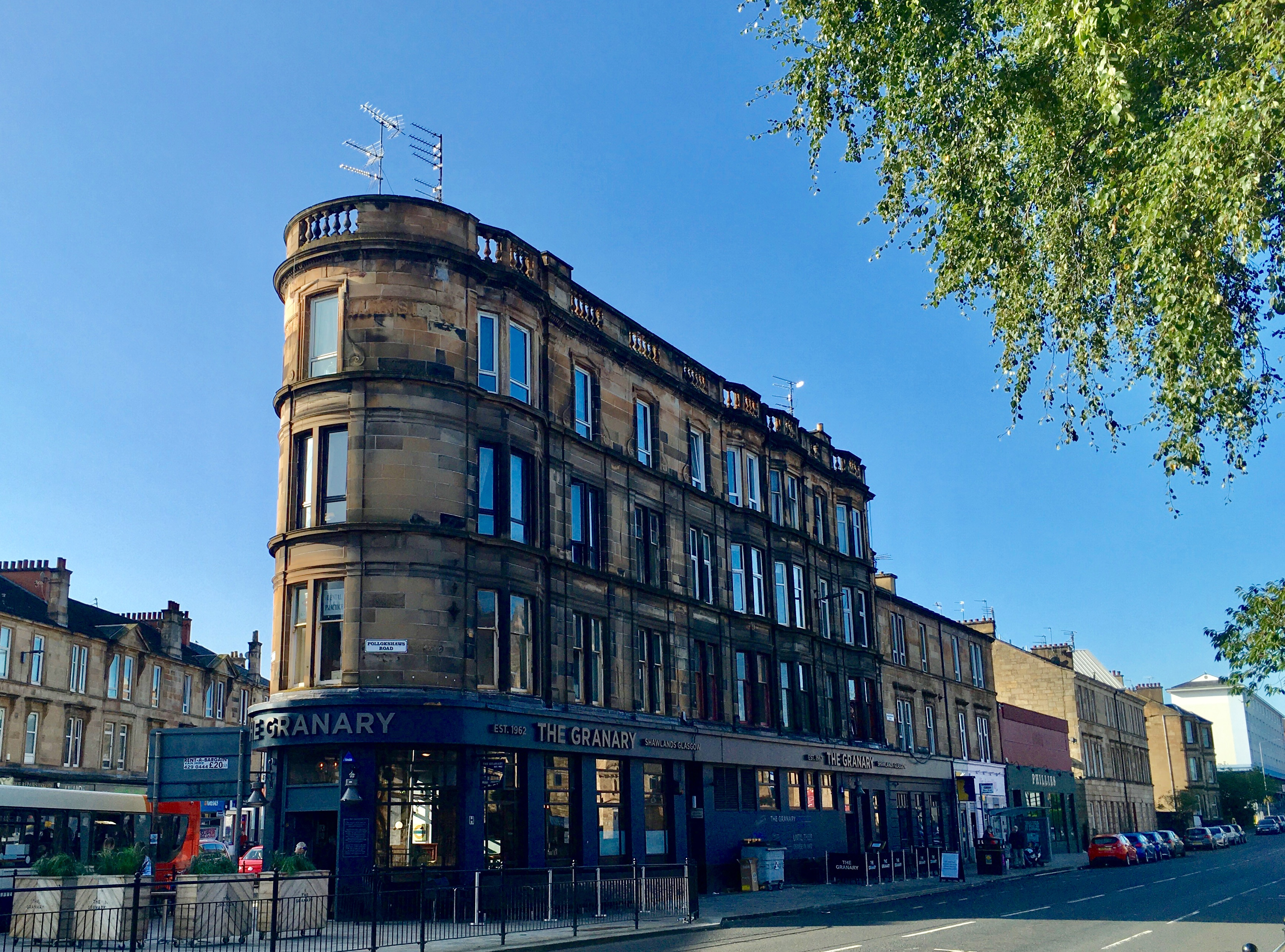
Crossmyloof Mansions and The Granary pub, Shawlands Cross

Within walking distance of Shawlands is Queens Park, acquired in 1857 and designed by the world-renowned Sir Joseph Paxton, also responsible for noted public parks in London, Liverpool, Birkenhead and the grounds of the Spa Buildings at Scarborough. The park was dedicated to the memory of Mary, Queen of Scots and not Queen Victoria, a common misconception given the proximity to Victoria Road. The park is steeped in history and was the site of the 16th century Battle of Langside.

The park also has allotments, a botanical glass house, public tennis courts, a public golf course, children's play areas, a boating pond and views of Glasgow. The refurbished amphitheatre holds open-air performances of Shakespeare and children's plays during summer. The park holds the annual Southside Festival, and the Wee Chill Music Festival.

The Langside Halls, a Category A listed building, stands on the corner of Queens Park, opposite the Corona Bar. The building was originally built for the National Bank of Scotland in Queen Street, and was resituated in 1901-3, to meet an evident need for a public hall on the southside. For many years, a drinking fountain constructed by the Saracen Foundry stood in front of the Halls, but was relocated to Glasgow Green.

On the other side of Shawlands is Pollok Country Park, one of Glasgow's most celebrated green spaces and home to Pollok House and the Burrell Collection. The park is Glasgow's largest park and the only Country Park within Glasgow. Its extensive woodlands and gardens provide a quiet sanctuary for both visitors and wildlife. The park is rich in rural history formerly being part of the Old Pollok Estate and ancestral home to the Maxwell Family. Pollok Country Park has been successful in achieving a Green Flag Award in 2016. This has been retained every year since 2012. The Green Flag Award is the benchmark national standard for quality parks and green spaces.

== Education ==
Shawlands Primary School has an approximate capacity of over 600 pupils and is part of the 'Shawlands New Learning Community' (which also includes Annette St Primary, Battlefield Primary, Blackfriars Primary, Cuthbertson Primary and Langside Primary) feeding to the non denominational secondary school in the area, Shawlands Academy, which has an approximate capacity of over 1,200 pupils. The school has just undergone an extensive renovation which has seen it transformed into Glasgow’s specialist languages centre; the Glasgow International School, the first of its kind in Scotland, also houses the bilingual Support Unit. It is estimated that over 50 languages are currently spoken by the school's pupils, representing the diverse multicultural pupil population.

Also in Shawlands is St. Conval's Primary, a Roman Catholic School situated on Shawhill Road; St. Conval's is part of the Learning Community for Holyrood R.C. Secondary School situated in the Crosshill area.

== Sport ==
Future Fitness, located on Kilmarnock Road, provides gym and aerobic exercise classes, alongside PureGym Shawlands Arcade. The area is also home to Shawlands bowling club and Pro Judo, the largest judo club in the West of Scotland. Hampden Park, Scotland's national football stadium is located less than 2 mi (3 km) from Shawlands Cross. Also just south of Shawlands is Newlandsfield Park, home of Pollok FC.

== Transport ==
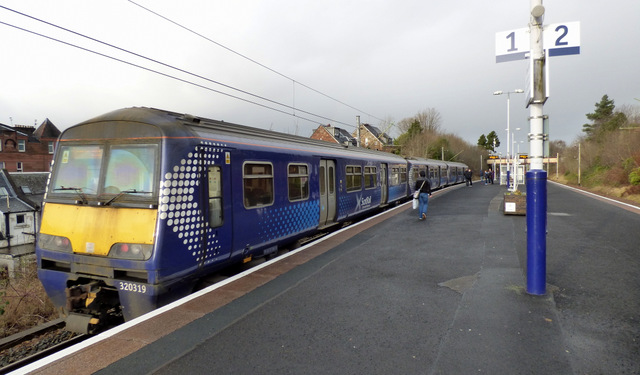
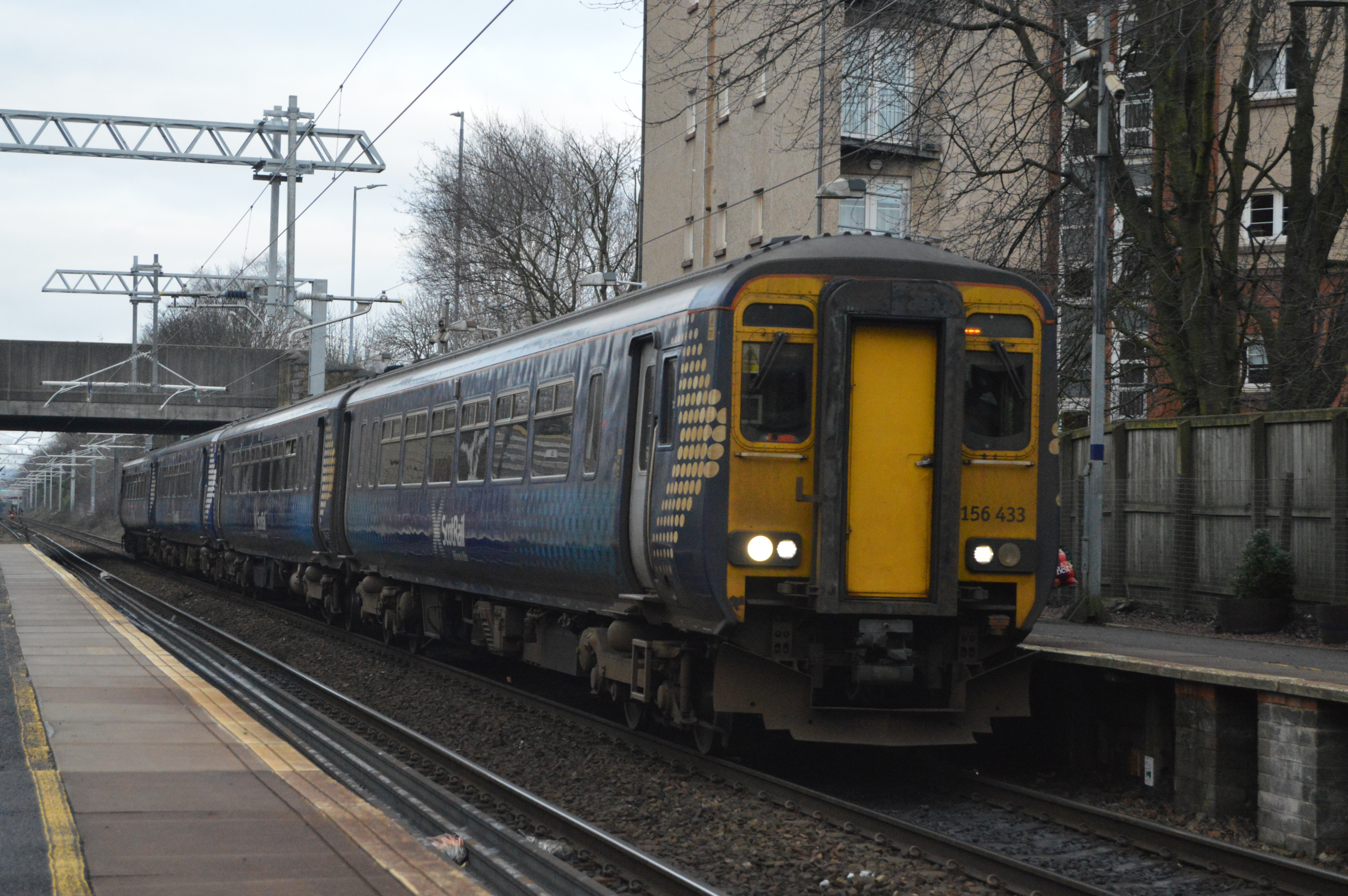
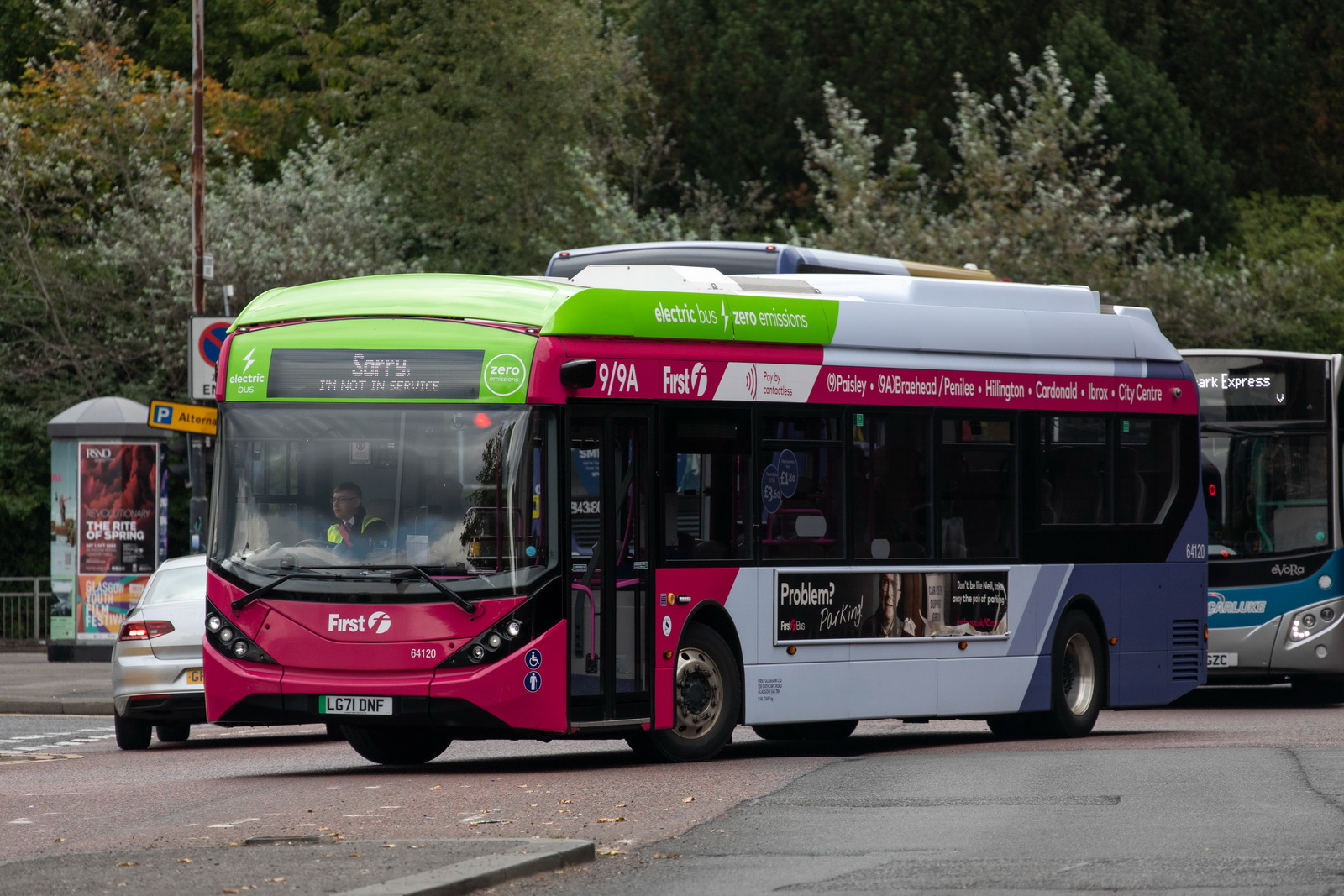
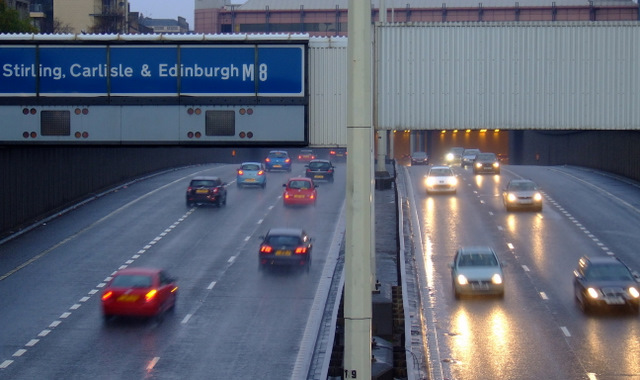
Transport in the area

Shawlands has close links to the M77 and M8 motorways (accessing at Dumbreck Road). Shawlands has two main roads which converge at Shawlands Cross: Kilmarnock Road and Pollokshaws Road. At the cross, the designation of the A77 road changes to Kilmarnock Road running south, with Pollokshaws Road continuing south-west as a more minor route. Bus services (the majority operated by First Glasgow) in the area are frequent.

The area is within walking distance of Crossmyloof Railway Station, Shawlands Railway Station and Pollokshaws East Railway Station. All stations have direct links to the city centre, terminating at Glasgow Central Station. Journey times to the city centre are under 10 minutes and services are provided by Scotrail.

Shawlands is located 8.8 mi (14.2 km) from Glasgow Airport and about 24 mi (39 km) from Glasgow Prestwick Airport.
