= Poloc Cricket Club =

Scottish cricket club

Team information
- Colours
- Founded: 1878; 147 years ago
- Dissolved: 2023; 2 years ago
- Home ground: Shawholm
- Official website: Poloc CC (archived)

Poloc Cricket Club was a cricket club based at Pollok Country Park in south Glasgow, Scotland.

The club's Shawholm ground encompassed the cricket oval, three all-weather tennis courts, and used to have the world's only six-hole golf course approved by The Royal and Ancient Golf Club of St Andrews. The clubhouse also hosted pool, table tennis, darts and poker tournaments in the winter months.

Poloc Cricket Club's two principal senior cricket teams played under the names "Poloc" and "Shawholm". Poloc played in the Cricket Scotland organised Cricket Scotland League, administered by the Western District Cricket Union ("WDCU"), whilst Shawholm played in WDCU's West Cricket Scotland Reserve League. Another XI - the Poloc Panthers - played in the WDCU Evening League, whilst a tapeball team, the Poloc Pythons, competed in the Cricket Scotland organised Tapeball League.

== History ==
Founded in 1878, Poloc Cricket Club spent its first season on the site of the old Pollokshaws Race Course and in 1880 moved to its current location at Shawholm.

A pavilion was acquired by the club from the now-defunct Pollokshields Athletic Club, also located on Pollok Estates, and the building was moved to Shawholm on rollers. In the same year, the main avenue from Pollokshaws Road to Pollok House was opened, running past the north side of the ground in what is now Pollok Park. This avenue still provides the approach to Shawholm with the River Cart to the left.

The club's winter golf section was formed in 1889, with bowls, putting and archery being added in the years following.

Full tenancy of the current 6-acre (24,000 m^{2}) site was granted to the club in 1888 by Sir John Stirling-Maxwell, 10th Baronet who continued to be involved in Poloc's affairs until his death in 1956.

In 1908 the Pollokshaws Working Lads Club decided to form a football team from amongst their ranks. Sir John Stirling Maxwell also allotted that club an area of land on the estate, rent-free. The footballers, to show their appreciation, took the name of Pollok Juniors FC, (later Pollok F.C.) and Sir John became their first Honorary President. The ground allocated became known as Haggs Park and was adjacent to Poloc Cricket Club; in fact, the different spellings of the two names "Pollok" and "Poloc" were adopted at this time, deliberately, to avoid confusion.

Membership at Poloc reached a peak of 600 in the late 1940s.

Scotland's first televised cricket match also took place at Shawholm on 7 May 1955 when West of Scotland Cricket Club were Poloc's visitors. Poloc batted first making 110 for 9. In reply, West made 120 for 6.

In March 2023, Poloc Cricket Club announced their lease of Shawholm was to be terminated after 143 years, and Cricket Scotland offered their support in trying to find a resolution.

After talks were unsuccessful, members voted for the dissolution of Poloc Cricket Club, taking effect from Friday 31 March 2023.

== Junior cricket ==
Poloc ran junior cricket teams at four age-group levels: under 10, 11, 12 and 16 and competed in West District Junior Cricket Union ("WDJCU") as well as Cricket Scotland-organised competitions. Under 10 and 11 players predominantly competed in "Kwik cricket" competitions. The club's junior sides won the WDCJU Under 11, 13 and 15 leagues in 2007, and were beaten finalists in the Under 18 Frank Smith Trophy. 2008 saw the Under 18s league champions, the Under 15s unbeaten and the Poloc Academy Strathclyde League winners, whilst 2009 saw a league championship for the Under 13Bs, another Frank Smith Trophy Final appearance and the Under 15s winning the Scottish Cup. 2010 brought the Under 18 league trophy to the club, and appearances at both the Under 18 Scottish Cup, and Under 18 Frank Smith Trophy, Finals Days. Success at junior level continued, with season 2015 seeing another Frank Smith Trophy win, the Under 11 league title and a win in the Under 12 WDJCU Indoor Super 8s tournament, and 2016 bringing another Under 18 league championship. The Under 19 WDJCU Indoor Super 8s tournament title was secured for the first time since the late 1980s in 2017.

== The Community Coaching Initiative ==
Poloc Cricket Club provided cricket coaching in its local community under the auspices of the "Community Coaching Initiative" since 2002. Working predominantly in the Glasgow City Council area coaching was provided to local Primary and Secondary Schools.

In addition, the club, under the umbrella of the Initiative and in partnership with the WDJCU, regularly hosted "Kwik cricket" festivals.

In addition to the work in local schools, the club's Community Coaching Initiative also worked with other community groups in providing sports coaching in and around the club's locality.

The Initiative was granted charitable status in early 2007 and was registered with the OSCR under number SC037774. The registered body itself is CCI Glasgow Limited, a private company limited by guarantee and registered in Scotland under number SC315322.

The work in its community was recognised by the Sports Council of Glasgow at its 2011 Awards Night when the club was voted the Accredited Club of the Year. The club was also awarded the highest Clubmark accreditation by Glasgow Life in 2011, one of only two Glasgow sports clubs to be awarded the "Stay Active" accreditation level.

== Golf ==
Poloc Cricket Club also played host to the UK's only R&A-recognised six-hole golf course.

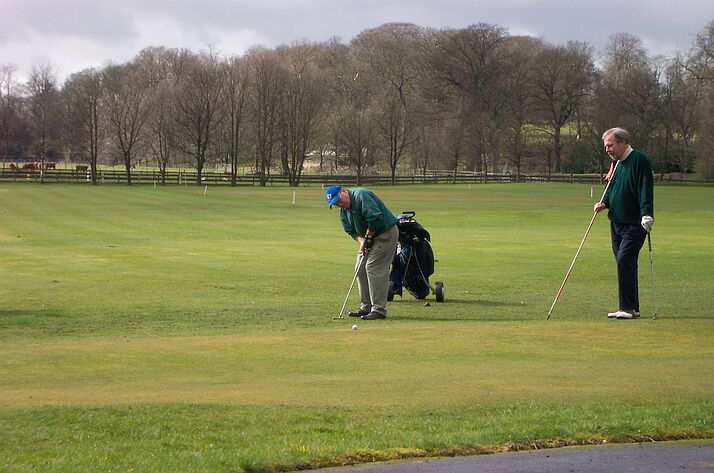
Putting on the 6th with the square behind

Founded in 1889, the Golf Section took over in the autumn and winter months. The course – "Wee Poloc" – was a unique challenge, with medals and other club competitions every fortnight throughout the winter golf season.

== Tennis ==
Poloc Cricket Club has three all-weather tennis courts, adjacent to the clubhouse building.

== Club honours ==
Senior Scottish Cup, winners: 1984;
Scottish Cup, runners-up: 1985, 1994;
Scottish Plate, winners: 2005;
SCU Trophy, winners: 2000;
SCU Trophy, runners-up: 1999;
SNCL, South Division, winners: 2004;
SNCL, Division Two, runners-up: 2000;
WDCU Championship, winners: 1928, 1956, 1957, 1958, 1964, 1981, 1983, 1985;
Rowan Cup, winners: 1926, 1957, 1981, 1983, 2004, 2007, 2015;
Rowan Cup, runners-up: 1976;
West League Cup, winners: 2015;
West League Cup, runners-up: 2006;
WDCU 2nd division, winners: 1914, 1928, 1950, 1964, 1969, 1971, 1981, 1983;
WDCU CSL Western First Division Reserve League winners: 2012, 2013, 2014;
WDCU 3rd division, winners: 1952;
Glasgow Cup, winners: 2003;
Greenwood Trophy, runners-up: 2013;
Sunday League 2nd division, winners: 2008, 2009, 2013, 2014;
Sunday League 3rd division - East, winners: 2014;
Evening League 2nd division, winners: 2014, 2019;
Evening League 3rd division, winners: 2015, 2016;
Evening League 3rd division - South, winners: 2013;
Glasgow & District Cricket League, winners: 1931;
John Haig Trophy Scottish Division, winners: 1982;
ECB Cockspur Cup Scottish Region, winners: 2007.

Junior Scottish Cup (under 15), winners: 2009;
WDJCU Junior League (under 18), winners: 1972, 1977, 1982, 2008, 2010, 2016;
WDJCU Minors League (under 15), winners: 1973, 1974, 1979, 2007;
WDJCU "B" League (under 15B), winners: 2007, 2008;
WDJCU Mini-Minors League (under 12/13), winners: 1984, 2005, 2007;
WDJCU "B" League (under 13B), winners: 2009, 2013;
WDJCU Mini-Mini-Minors League (under 11), winners: 2007, 2015 (joint);
Frank Smith Trophy (under 16/17/18), winners: 1975, 1984, 2012, 2014;
Frank Smith Trophy (under 16/17/18), runners-up: 2004, 2007, 2009;
WDJCU Indoor Competition (under 19), winners: 1988, 2017;
WDJCU Indoor Competition (under 12), winners: 2015
