= Pollok Country Park =

Park in Glasgow, Scotland

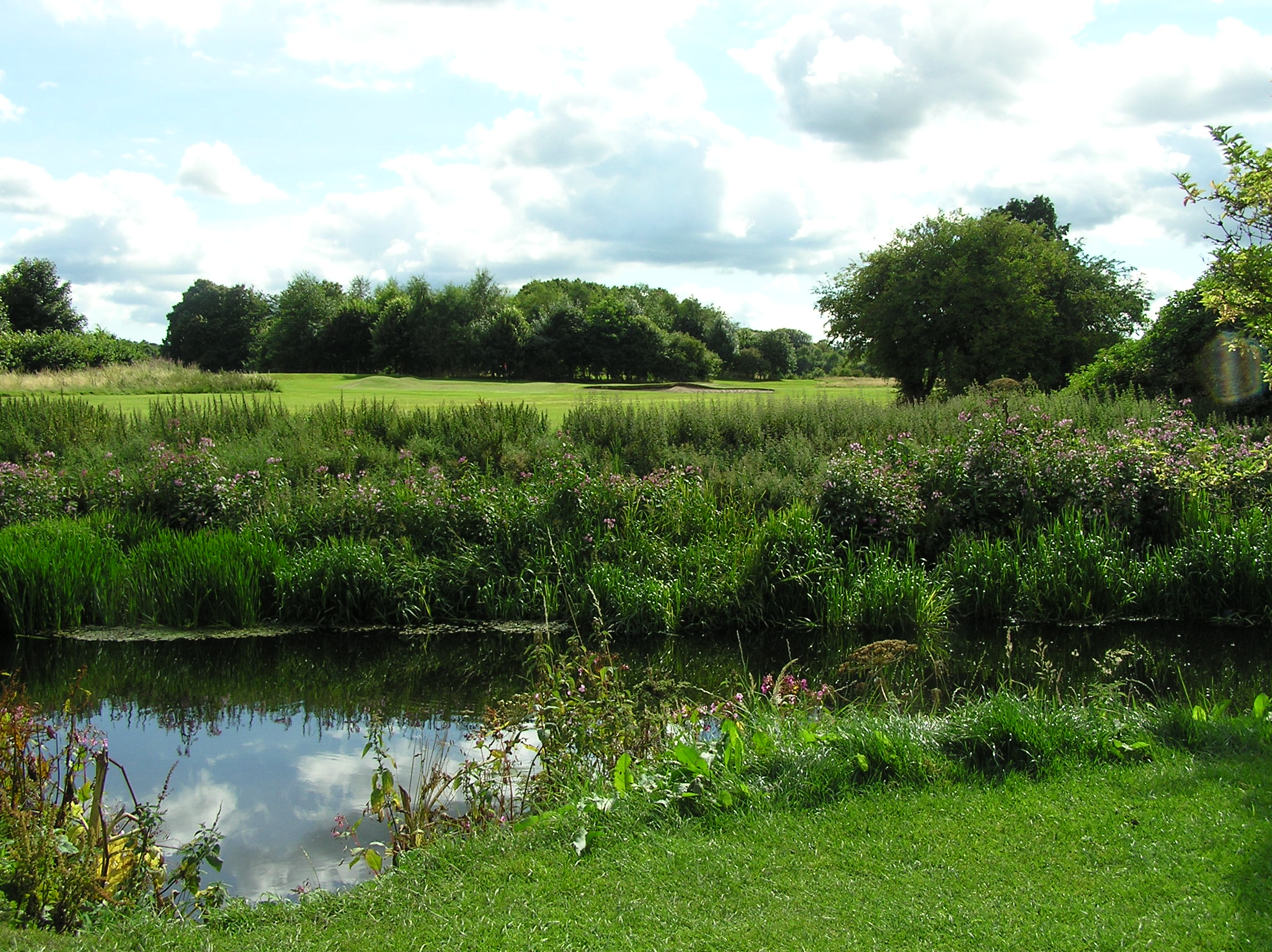
- Interactive map of Pollok Country Park
- Type: Country park
- Location: Glasgow, Scotland
- OS grid: NS5545262170
- Coordinates: 55°49′40″N 4°18′45″W
- Area: 146 hectares (361 acres)
- Operator: Glasgow City Council
- Open: Open all year
- Awards: Britain's Best Park (2007); Best Park in Europe (2008)
- Public transit: Pollokshaws West railway station

Inventory of Gardens and Designed Landscapes in Scotland
- Official name: Pollok Park (Nether Pollok)
- Designated: 1 July 1987
- Reference no.: GDL00317

Pollok Country Park is a 146-hectare (361-acre) country park located between Shawlands, Crossmyloof, and Pollok in Glasgow, Scotland. In 2007, Pollok Country Park was named Britain's Best Park, and in 2008 it was named the Best Park in Europe, beating competition from parks in Italy, France, Germany, Poland and Sweden. Despite this, by 2019 it was considered that the park was 'underused' with plans drawn up to encourage more visitors.

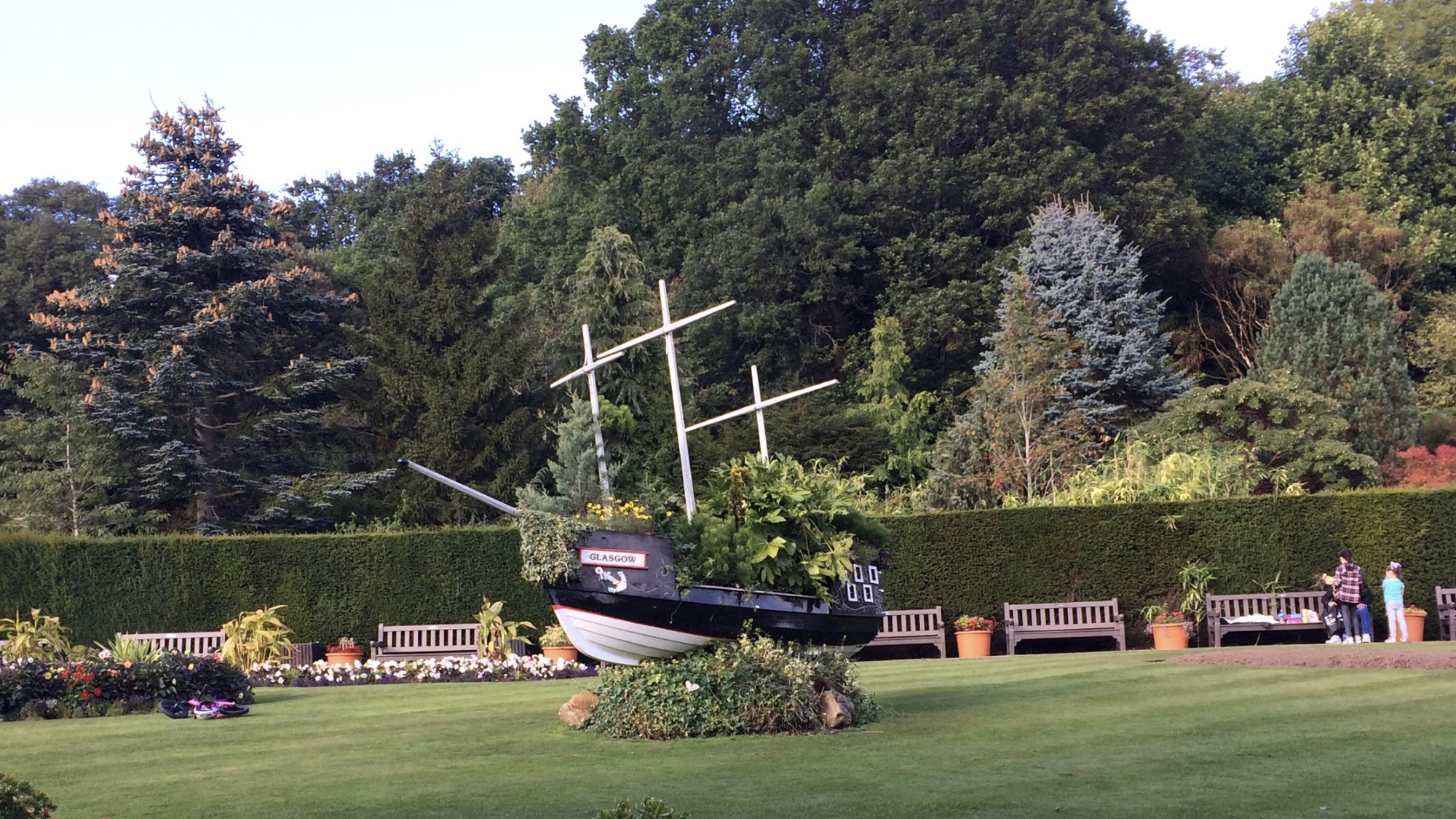
A flower boat in the walled garden

== History and features ==
The park, through which the White Cart Water flows towards Paisley, is the largest within the city of Glasgow. It was originally part of the Old Pollok Estate, which was home to the Maxwell family for over 700 years. In 1966 Mrs Anne Maxwell Macdonald gifted the estate, including Pollok House, to Glasgow Corporation with the condition that it remained a public park.

In 1878 the Poloc Cricket Club was established. Their Shawholm ground, which was converted to a football facility in 2023, is one of several sporting facilities which ring the core of the park. This includes public playing fields at Nether Pollok near Shawlands (once containing the home ground of Pollok F.C. until 1926) and Norwood near Pollokshields, the private fields of Police Scotland and Hutchesons' Grammar School (previously, Craigholme School), the rugby ground of Cartha Queens Park RFC, Dumbreck Riding School and two golf clubs: Haggs Castle (founded 1910) located next to the M77 motorway and Pollok (1892) to the north of Barrhead Road, a dual carriageway which is the only direct route between the east and west sides of the park approximately 1.4 miles (2.3 km) in length. On the other side of the road is a further golf club, Cowglen (1906).

In 1954 the park also became home to Pollokshaws Bowling Club, the land donated by Sir John Maxwell Stirling-Maxwell of Pollok House; the club moved across Pollokshaws Road to celebrate its centenary. It is located near to Pollokshaws West railway station on the Glasgow South Western Line which is the nearest to the centre of the park and near-adjacent to its main entrance; Shawlands railway station on a different route (the Cathcart Circle) is approximately a 0.5 km walk from the main entrance.

The park also contains the Burrell Collection, a purpose-built building designed to hold the large, eclectic antique and art collection of shipping magnate William Burrell, who donated the collection to the City of Glasgow on his death. Another feature of interest is the award-winning fold of Highland cattle, which is the most accessible of this species for the majority of Scots. In 2004, three mountain biking routes were opened by Olympic cyclist Chris Hoy. Strathclyde Police's mounted and dog-handling divisions are based in the park. There are two allotment gardens, one near Haggs Castle Golf Club and one at Pollokshaws.

== Protests ==
In the early 1990s the park was the site of a road protest camp, the "Pollok Free State", which attempted to prevent the M77 motorway from cutting through the south-west side of the park and separating it from the nearby housing schemes. The road cost £53 million and destroyed 5,000 trees in a 7-mile (11 km) stretch of the park. Protesters, including local schoolchildren, attempted to prevent this using tactics such as building and occupying treehouses and tunnels. There was also a "Carhenge" of burnt-out and half-buried cars, from as far afield as Brighton, placed in the path of the road. Eviction of the camp by Wimpey bailiffs and police began on 23 March 1995, arresting 15 and injuring one. Though the camp failed to prevent the road being built, it was a formative experience for many Glasgow activists who had no previous experience of direct action. It also led to the resignation of M.P. Allan Stewart. As campaigners feared, the motorway has disconnected the park from communities to its north and west (Pollok, Corkerhill and Mosspark) with almost no direct access – there is one walkway on the north bank of the White Cart from near Corkerhill); by contrast, the eastern side of the park has three vehicular routes and two more access points for pedestrians and cyclists.

In early 2008 a campaign to "Save Pollok Park" was formed, protesting against outdoor adventure company Go Ape; the company was invited by Glasgow City Council to enhance outdoor recreational activities within the park. Over five thousand residents objected to the proposals to site a high wire forest adventure in the ancient North Wood.
