= Shawholm =

Former cricket ground in Glasgow, Scotland

Coordinates: 55.827°N 4.305°W

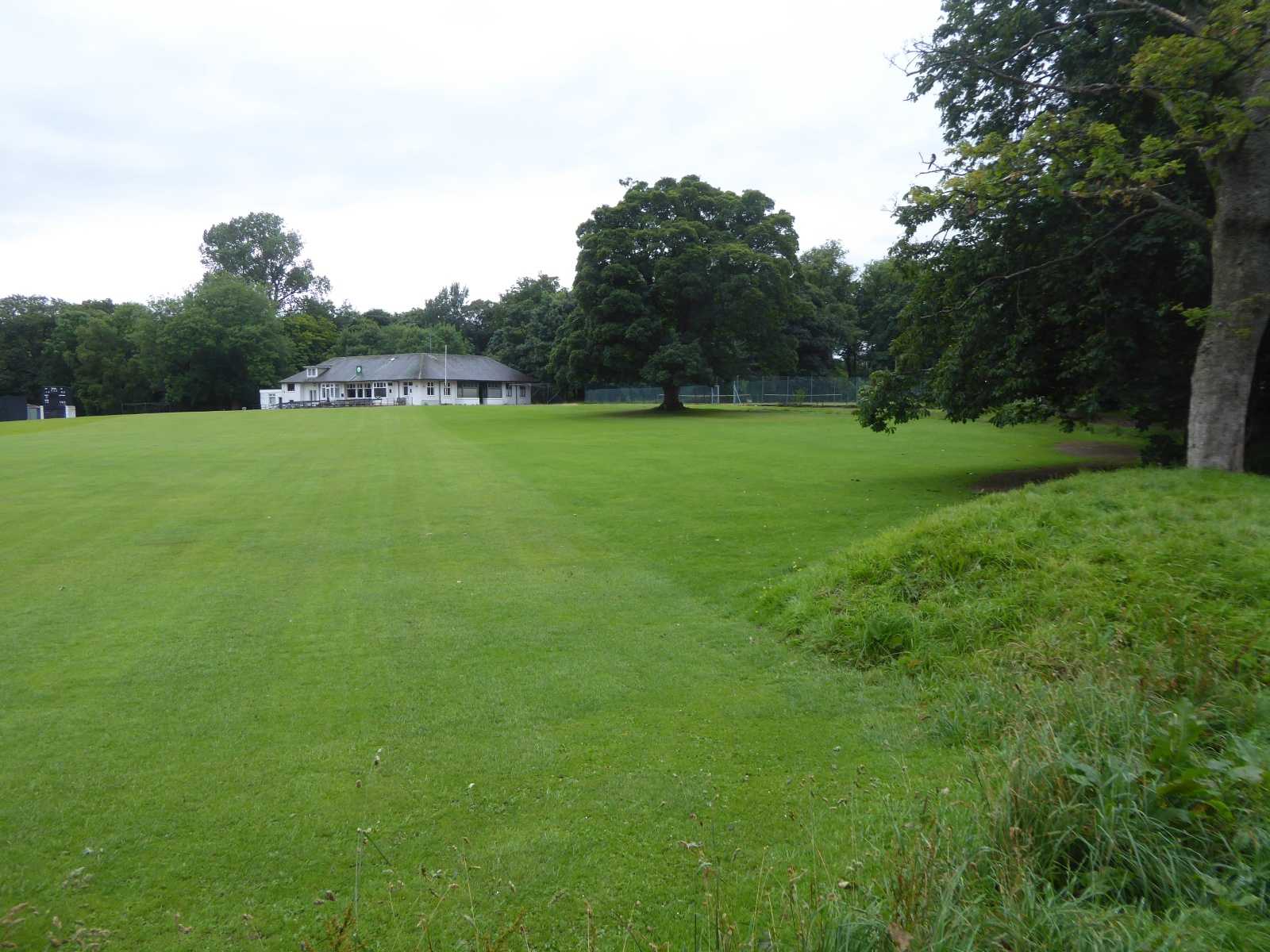
View of Shawholm from the south, 2017

Shawholm is a former cricket ground in Glasgow, Scotland. Located within Pollok Country Park, it was the home ground of Poloc Cricket Club and staged three first-class matches.

The earliest match hosted by the club that is, arguably, of historic interest was the game between a West of Scotland select team and the Australian Imperial Forces as part of the latter's tour of England in 1919.

Shawholm also played host to Scotland versus the MCC in June 1965 in a three-day match played between the 23rd and 25th. Subsequent Scotland international matches staged at the ground included versus Ireland in 1978. and Sri Lanka in 1979.

Scotland's first televised cricket match also took place at Shawholm on 7 May 1955 when West of Scotland Cricket Club were Poloc's visitors. Poloc batted first making 110 for 9. In reply, West made 120 for 6.

The ground was invited to host three internationals as part of the 2006 ECC European Championships. The matches (Netherlands versus Italy, Jersey versus Germany and Netherlands versus Denmark) saw white ball/black sightscreen cricket at Shawholm for the first time.

The club also hosted the Scottish club Twenty20 Finals Day, the Murgitroyd Twenty20, first played for in 2008.

== Change in tenancy ==
In March 2023, Poloc Cricket Club announced their 145-year lease of Shawholm was being terminated on 30 April. The W Academy, a football youth coaching organisation, took over the venue a short time later.
