= Kennishead =

Coordinates: 55.813079°N 4.323476°W

Kennishead: Scottish Gaelic: Ceann Ceanais; Scots: Kennisheid
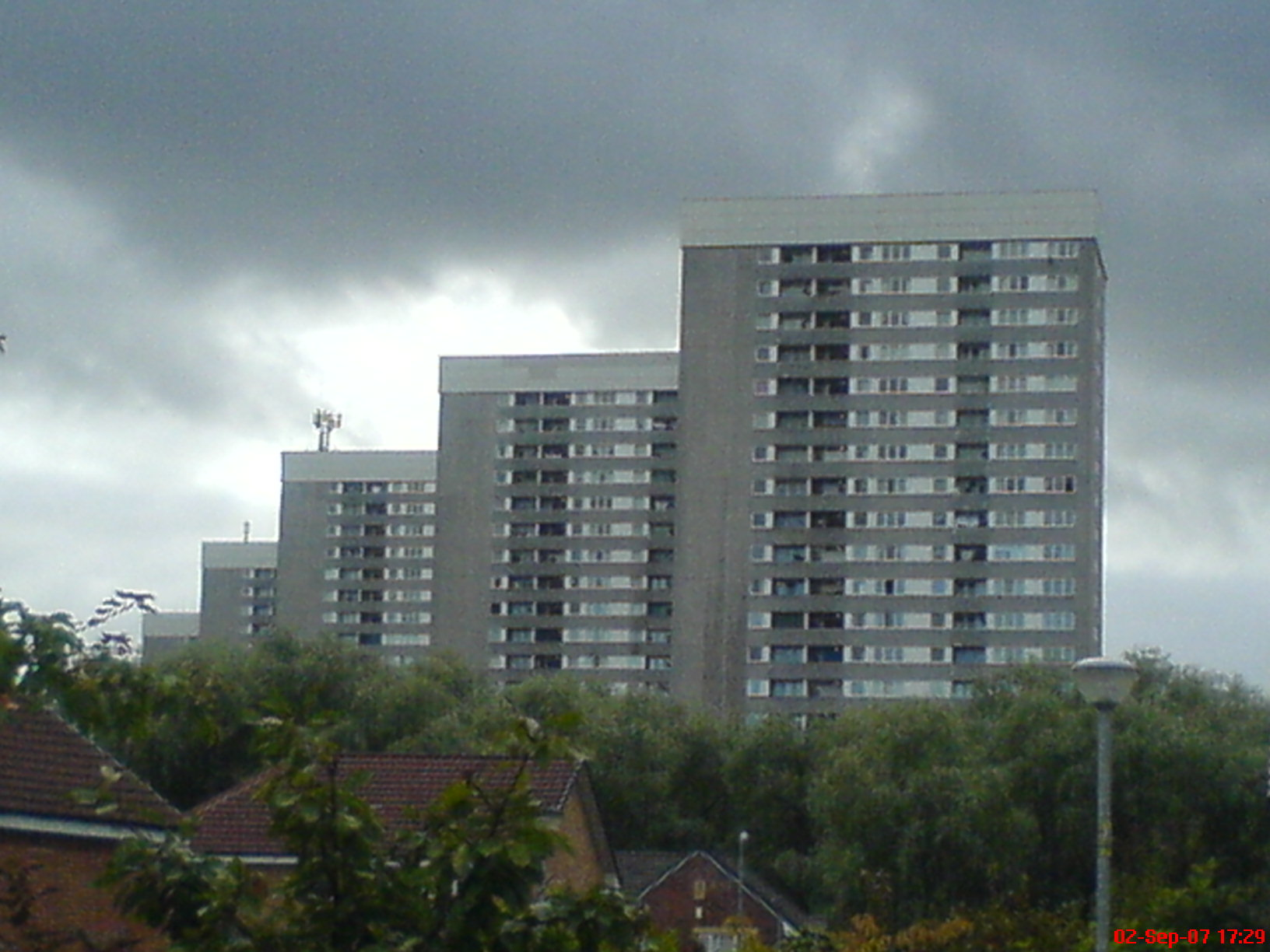
- Tower blocks on Kennishead Avenue in 2007, before front two demolished

- Location within Glasgow
- OS grid reference: NS545602
- Council area: Glasgow City Council
- Lieutenancy area: Glasgow
- Country: Scotland
- Sovereign state: United Kingdom
- Post town: GLASGOW
- Postcode district: G46
- Dialling code: 0141
- Police: Scotland
- Fire: Scottish
- Ambulance: Scottish
- UK Parliament: Glasgow South
- Scottish Parliament: Glasgow Cathcart

Kennishead (Scots: Kennisheid, Scottish Gaelic: Ceann Ceanais) is a neighbourhood in the Scottish city of Glasgow. Its territory, south of the River Clyde, is fairly isolated, bordering a park to the south and a golf course to the north, as well as the residential area of Carnwadric. The majority of the housing consists of three (originally five, two since demolished) high rise tower blocks of 23 storeys, which dominate the area visually.

The area is also home to the disused farm from which it takes its name, formerly owned by Sir John Maxwell.

Kennishead was originally called "Kenneth's Head".

Kennishead railway station is on the Glasgow South Western Line to Barrhead.

== See also ==
- Glasgow tower blocks
