= Pollokshaws West railway station =

Railway station in Glasgow, Scotland

Pollokshaws West Scottish Gaelic: Pollokshaws an Iar
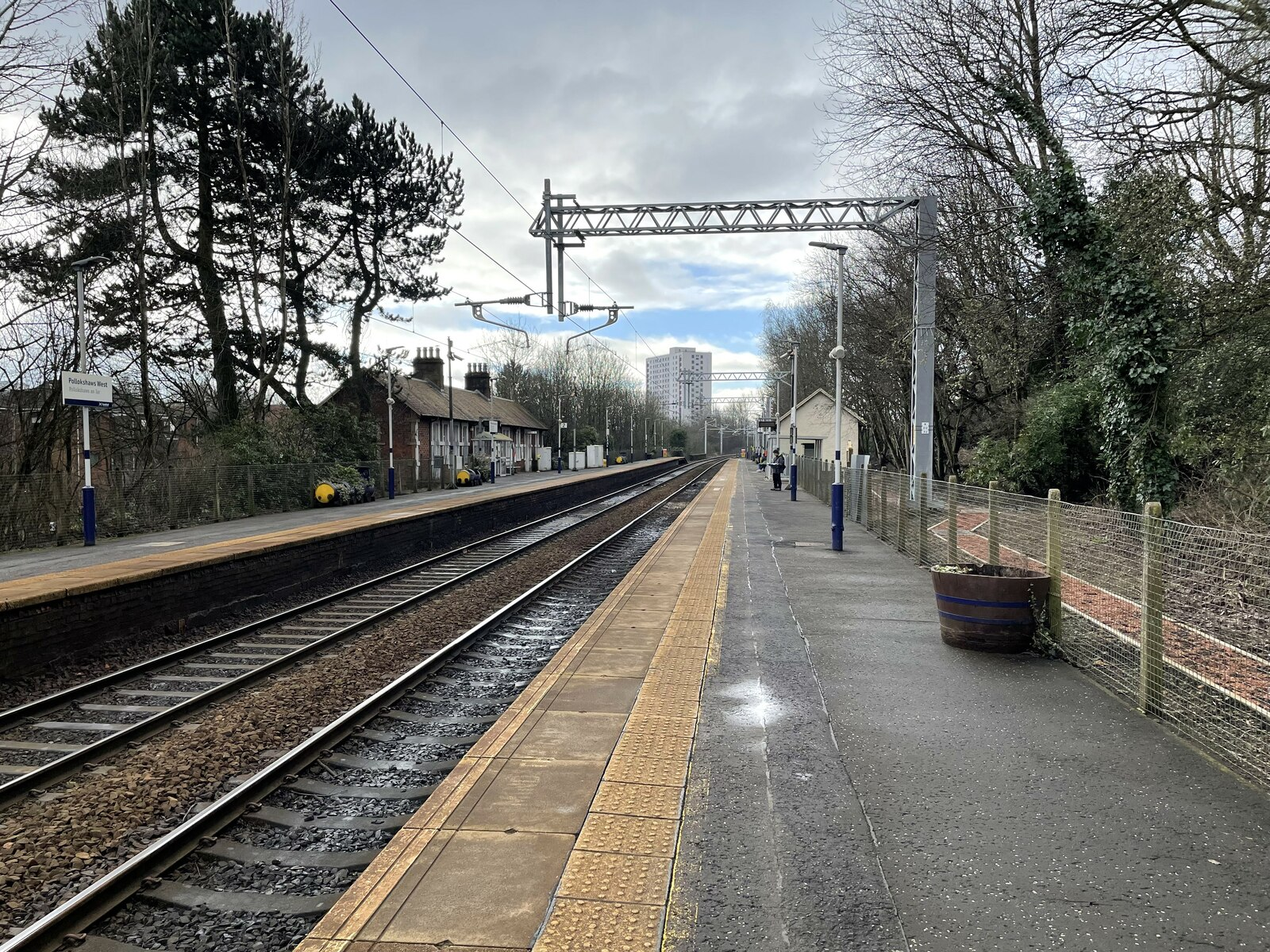

General information
- Location: Pollokshaws, Glasgow; Scotland
- Coordinates: 55.8239°N 4.3014°W
- Grid reference: NS559613
- Managed by: ScotRail
- Transit authority: SPT
- Platforms: 2

Other information
- Station code: PWW

History
- Original company: Glasgow, Barrhead and Neilston Direct Railway
- Pre-grouping: CR & G&SWR
- Post-grouping: LMS

Key dates
- 27 September 1848: Opened as Pollokshaws
- 5 May 1952: Renamed as Pollokshaws West

Passengers
- 2020/21: ▼49,970
- 2021/22: ▲0.134 million
- 2022/23: ▲0.225 million
- 2023/24: ▲0.283 million
- 2024/25: ▲0.305 million
Location
Notes
- Passenger statistics from the Office of Rail and Road

Pollokshaws West railway station is a railway station in Glasgow, Scotland. The station is managed by ScotRail and is served by trains on the Glasgow South Western Line.

== History ==
The station was opened as Pollokshaws on 27 September 1848 by Glasgow, Barrhead and Neilston Direct Railway, which later became the Glasgow, Barrhead and Kilmarnock Joint Railway - a joint railway company between the Caledonian Railway and the Glasgow and South Western Railway. To the south west is Busby Junction where the Busby Railway (latterly part of the Caledonian Railway) diverges. Following grouping, the station became part of the London Midland and Scottish Railway.

It was not until British Railways days - 5 May 1952 - that the station was renamed as Pollokshaws West. The station buildings are now protected as a category B listed building.

== Services ==
The station is normally served by a service every half hour to Barrhead (Mondays — Saturdays only), Kilmarnock and to East Kilbride, and four trains per hour to Glasgow Central. On Sundays, there are half hourly services to Glasgow Central, with hourly services to East Kilbride and Kilmarnock. There is no Barrhead service on Sundays, as Kilmarnock trains operate all stops. Additionally, one Kilmarnock service extends to Carlisle on Sundays only.

The station is an interchange station for services between the East Kilbride line, and the Barrhead line, with trains extending to Kilmarnock and a few trains a day to Dumfries as well as a weekly service to Carlisle.

Pollokshaws West lies immediately adjacent to the Pollok Country Park. It is the nearest station to the park's Burrell Collection and Pollok House (approximately 10 minutes' walk).

Preceding station	National Rail	Following station
Kennishead	ScotRail; Glasgow South Western Line	Crossmyloof
Thornliebank	ScotRail; Glasgow South Western Line	Crossmyloof
	Historical railways	
Kennishead; Line and station open	Caledonian and Glasgow & South Western Railways; Glasgow, Barrhead and Neilston Direct Railway	Crossmyloof; Line and station open
Thornliebank; Line and station open	Caledonian Railway; Busby Railway	connection to GB&KJR
