= Thornliebank railway station =

Railway station in East Renfrewshire, Scotland

Thornliebank
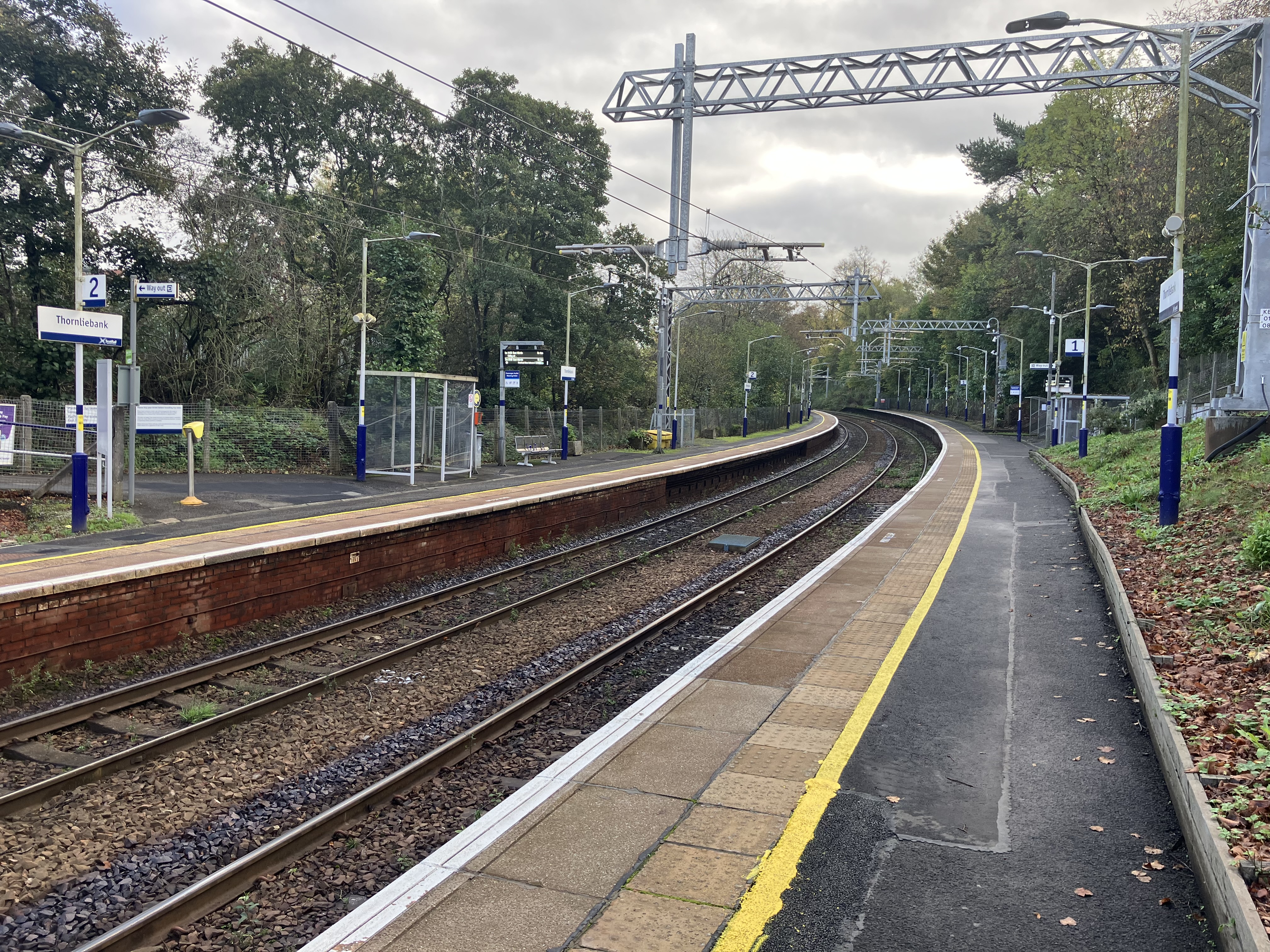
- View east towards Giffnock

General information
- Location: Thornliebank, East Renfrewshire; Scotland
- Coordinates: 55.8108°N 4.3114°W
- Grid reference: NS552599
- Managed by: ScotRail
- Platforms: 2

Other information
- Station code: THB

History
- Original company: Busby Railway
- Pre-grouping: Caledonian Railway
- Post-grouping: LMS

Key dates
- 1 October 1881: Opened

Passengers
- 2020/21: ▼50,950 (Note: Impacted by the COVID-19 lockdown in the United Kingdom)
- 2021/22: ▲0.144 million
- 2022/23: ▲0.190 million
- 2023/24: ▲0.256 million
- 2024/25: ▼0.196 million (Note: Impacted due to January-May closure for electrification)
Location
Notes
- Passenger statistics from the Office of Rail and Road

Thornliebank railway station is a railway station serving the village of Thornliebank, Greater Glasgow on the East Kilbride–Glasgow Central line. The station is managed by ScotRail, which provides all services at the station.

== History ==
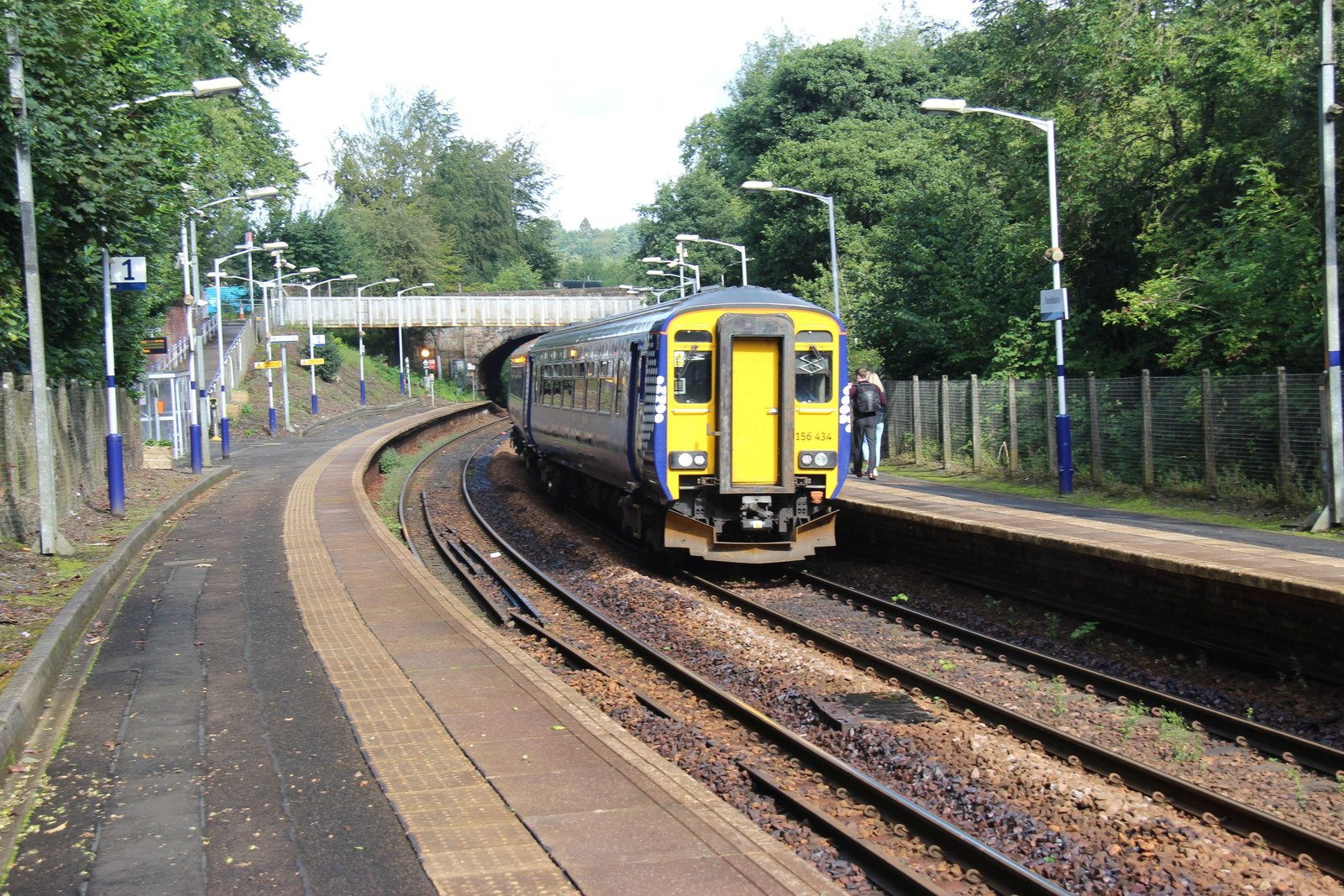
The station in 2019, prior to electrification

The station was opened by the Busby Railway on 1 October 1881.

There was a ticket office located on the down (Glasgow bound) platform, but was destroyed by vandals in 1983.

== Services ==
The station has a half-hourly service in each direction (including Sundays) to Glasgow Central and East Kilbride.

Preceding station	National Rail	Following station
Giffnock	ScotRail; East Kilbride–Glasgow Central line	Pollokshaws West
	Historical railways	
Giffnock; Line and station open	Caledonian Railway; Busby Railway	Pollokshaws; Line and station open
