= Crossmyloof =

Area of Glasgow, Scotland

Coordinates: 55.835313°N 4.288071°W

Crossmyloof: Scottish Gaelic: Crois MoLiubha; Scots: Crossmaluif
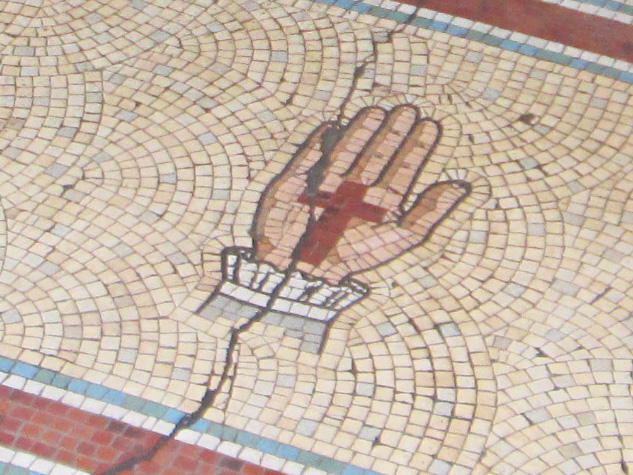
- Cross in palm of hand, Corona Bar

- Location within the Glasgow City council area Location within Scotland
- OS grid reference: NS568626
- Council area: Glasgow City
- Lieutenancy area: Glasgow
- Country: Scotland
- Sovereign state: United Kingdom
- Post town: GLASGOW
- Postcode district: G41
- Dialling code: 0141
- Police: Scotland
- Fire: Scottish
- Ambulance: Scottish
- UK Parliament: Glasgow South
- Scottish Parliament: Glasgow Southside

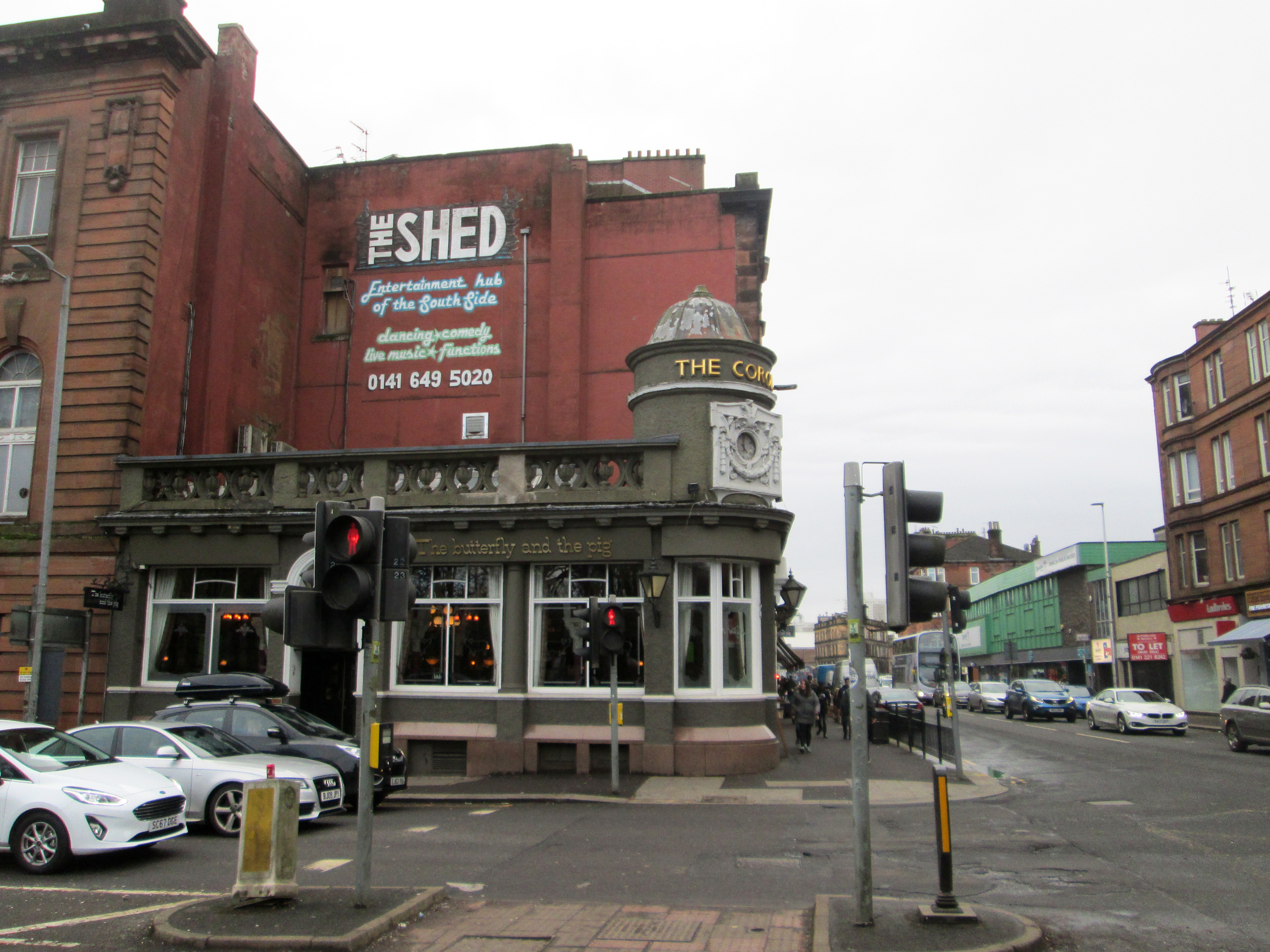
The Corona Bar stands at the location of the original village, on the junction between Langside Avenue and Pollokshaws Road.

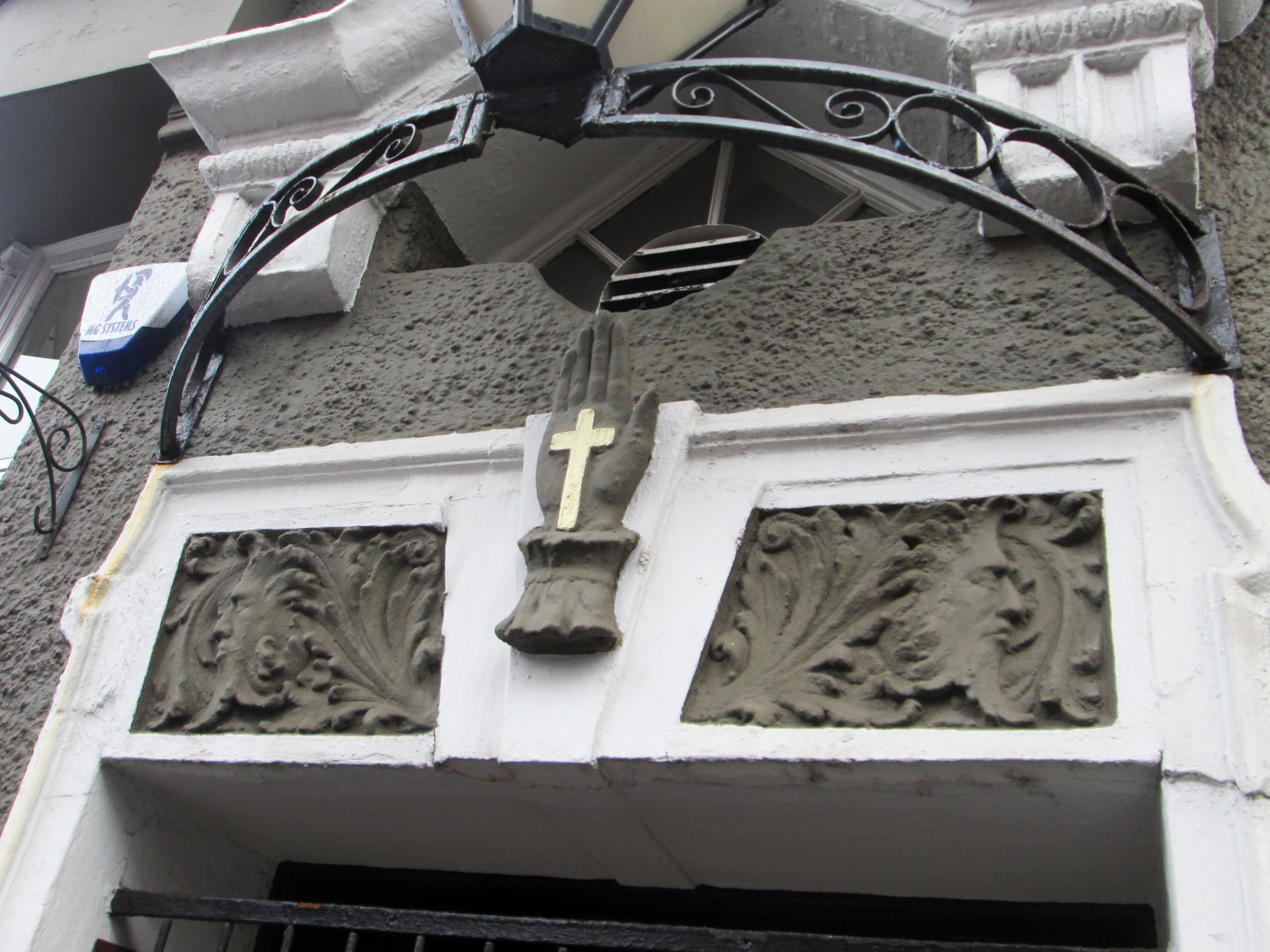
The doorways of the Corona Bar have images of a cross on the palm of a hand, supposedly the origin of the name of the village

Crossmyloof (/ˌkrɒsməˈluːf/, Scottish Gaelic: Crois MoLiubha, Scots: Crossmaluif) is an area on the south side of Glasgow situated between the districts of Pollokshields, Strathbungo and Shawlands in Scotland.

== Etymology ==
The name is possibly derived from Gaelic Crois MoLiubha, Saint (Ma)lieu's Cross.

According to local belief, the name is reputed to be derived from its location on the route taken by Mary, Queen of Scots to the site of the Battle of Langside. A fortune-teller may have offered to tell the queen her fate if she would "cross her loof (palm) with silver".

== History ==
The original village of Crossmyloof was situated in the north-western corner of Cathcart parish and was formed around the junction of what are now Pollokshaws Road and Langside Avenue (the road to Cathcart). Crossmyloof was a small hamlet which suddenly grew in prominence when Neale Thomson opened a large bakery there in 1847. Some remnants of this industrial past still endure. A bakery building behind the tenement known as Camphill Gate on Pollokshaws Road still stands, and there is still a road named Baker Street, where once stood the Alexander "Greek" Thomson-designed workers' cottages.

The main street in Crossmyloof was Cathcart Place, which is now part of Pollokshaws Road between the Langside Avenue/Minard Road junction and Shawlands Cross at the junction with Kilmarnock Road and Moss-side Road. A pub has occupied the Langside Avenue corner from the early 19th century: the Corona Bar, built there in 1912, carries a claim to have been established in 1817.

Crossmyloof was little more than the main street until the late Victorian era, when Minard Road was opened up and the area around Waverley Gardens was built. For twenty years the tenements in Norham Street and Frankfort Street looked out on open countryside, dotted with ancient cottages, separating them from the Waverley Park area of Shawlands until the Waverley Scheme was constructed by the Glasgow Corporation on the land opened up when Moss-side Road was formed to build Shawlands Academy.

In 1818 Crossmyloof was described as the most populous village in Cathcart parish. Although till recently "remarkable chiefly for being a resort of vagrants", the writer was happy to report that the village had now become more respectable from an increase in the number of its inhabitants, who now amounted to around 500. The remarks were a little premature, because in November 1820 two members of a band of armed ruffians who robbed a house in Crossmyloof were hanged in front of the Jail in the Saltmarket. The attack took place at the home of Dr Robert Watt, the author of the four volume Bibliotheca Britannica, who had died, allegedly of overwork, the previous year. His terrified widow had a pistol held at her head and her gold rings wrenched off her fingers. She is reported as having hastily left Crossmyloof for the safety of a home in Hutchesontown. When the Rev James Smith wrote his account of Cathcart parish in 1840, he used the name Westfield for the village and gave the number of families as 124 and the total population as 587 persons. At this period the villagers were mostly cotton handloom weavers. The only remaining woollen weaver was William AIgie, assisted by his seven children, three of whom wove woollen cloth, and four of whom worked in cotton. Two elderly women, Mary Sinclair, a muslin flowerer, and Margaret Wotherspoon, a muslin tambourer, were probably the last of the skilled embroideresses in the village. There were also a few shopkeepers, a blacksmith, several brassfounders and tinsmiths and William Ferguson, a lithographic engraver.

By 1851 the population had risen sharply to 939 persons. The rise was accounted for by the establishment of the Crossmyloof Bakery in 1847 by Neale Thomson of Camphill. The following year James Muirhead moved his Cart Forge from its original site in the Skin Mill Yard at Pollokshaws to larger premises at Crossmyloof, where he produced axles for railway wagons. The Cart Forge was situated between Baker Street, where Thomson's workforce was housed, and the Pollokshaws Road.

Although most of the villagers lived along the Pollokshaws Road there was another small community in the area between Titwood Road and Moss-side Road. This area was known as Langside Valley and contained a few villas and cottages and several orchards and nurseries. This was where Glaswegians came in the Summer to enjoy fresh air and healthy surroundings. An advertisement in the Glasgow Courier of 25 February 1802 offers two "neat" lodgings at the village of Westfield for renting as summer quarters for "genteel families" from the city, who would find the houses well adapted for their use with the convenience of good water and a "neat" plot of ground. The villa owners included James Smellie, a retired cooper who occupied the house called Langside Valley, and William Jaffrey, an accountant and notary public and owner of Campvale House. Springhill House was the residence of Henry Murphy, a pawnbroker and hat manufacturer in the Bridgegate. The house later became Springhill Academy with William Cairns and William Christie as joint headmasters. Archibald McAuslan was the local surgeon and physician, and the community included a group of customs officers with the titles of outdoor officer, running officer, clerk, weigher and locker.

When Hugh MacDonald passed through Crossmyloof on one of his Rambles in 1851, he found that the weavers of Crossmyloof and Strathbungo, like their neighbours on the hill above at Langside, were "celebrated growers of tulips, pansies, dahlias and other floricultural favourites" and met regularly at their florist clubs to examine choice flowers and discuss the best means of rearing them to perfection. Of these "bloom worshippers", MacDonald writes:

There are some sharp-sighted people who are said to see further into a millstone than their neighbours. For the truth of the saying we shall not venture to vouch; but most assuredly, for seeing into the mysteries of a tulip or a dahlia, we shall back a Crossmyloof or Strabungo weaver against the united amateurs of Scotland.

In his report on the parish, the minister also explained that a "large and excellent school" under the patronage of Neale Thomson of Camphill, served the inhabitants of Crossmyloof and district, although it stood just across the boundary within Eastwood parish. The parish boundary was formed here by the Waterland stream, and its course can be traced between the ruinous remains of two old walls behind the school building on the north side of Skirving Street, now used as shops. Mr Smith describes how a number of years before, when there was no teacher for two years, the inhabitants, mostly weavers, formed themselves into an educational society to be managed by twelve directors under the presidency of the minister, and some of the "more intelligent" of the villagers undertook the task of teachers: a room was hired for the purpose, and a school opened from 8 to 10 o'clock at night, in which the teachers, two by two, in monthly turn, gave gratuitous instruction to whatever children were committed to their charge. The duty of the directors was principally to visit the school, and to wait upon careless parents to urge upon them the propriety of securing to their children the advantages which it offered. In 1877 the Cathcart School Board built Crossmyloof Public School in Stevenson (now Deanston) Drive. This school building has since been converted into flats.

The first church to be erected in Crossmyloof was Langside Road Church (later Langside Avenue). This was built in 1859 for a United Presbyterian congregation which had been formed two years previously. The site at the corner of Baker Street and Langside Avenue was gifted by Neale Thomson. A new church was built on the same site in 1896. The congregation united with that of Shawlands Old in 1963 and the Langside Avenue buildings became St Helen's Catholic Church.

The Langside Halls stand nearby, on the edge of Queen's Park. This building was originally the Bank of Glasgow, designed by John Gibson, when it stood in Queen Street in the centre of the city. In 1902-03 the building was relocated to its present site and converted to serve as public halls.

Pollokshaws Road and Minard Road provided the shopping area for Crossmyloof, Shawlands and Langside – mainly in small shop units until the construction of the area's first supermarket by the Co-operative during the 1960s.

== Facilities ==
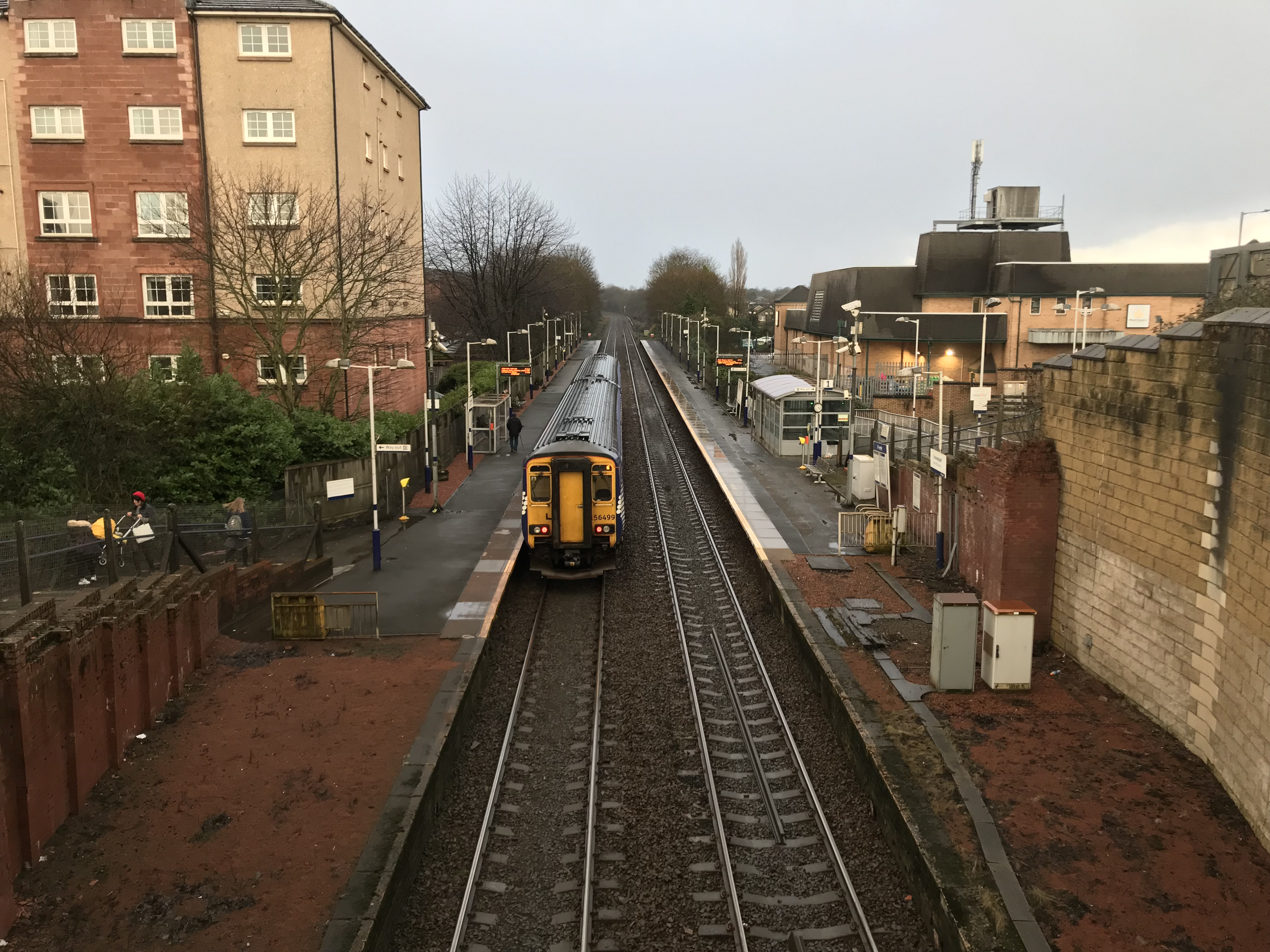
Crossmyloof railway station

Crossmyloof is served by a railway station on the Glasgow South Western Line, offering regular services to Glasgow Central. For many years, the most visible evidence of the area's name was the signage for Crossmyloof Ice Rink adjacent to the railway line, but that was replaced by a supermarket during the 1980s, which remains open today run by Morrisons. It was the first indoor ice rink in Scotland.

As well as the Langside Halls, the ice rink, the churches and the pubs on Pollokshaws Road, the area's main social amenity was the Waverley Cinema from 1922 until the early 1970s when the decline in film-going led to its conversion first into a bingo hall and then to TUSK nightclub and the Waverley Tearooms.
