= Kennishead railway station =

Railway station in Glasgow, Scotland

Kennishead
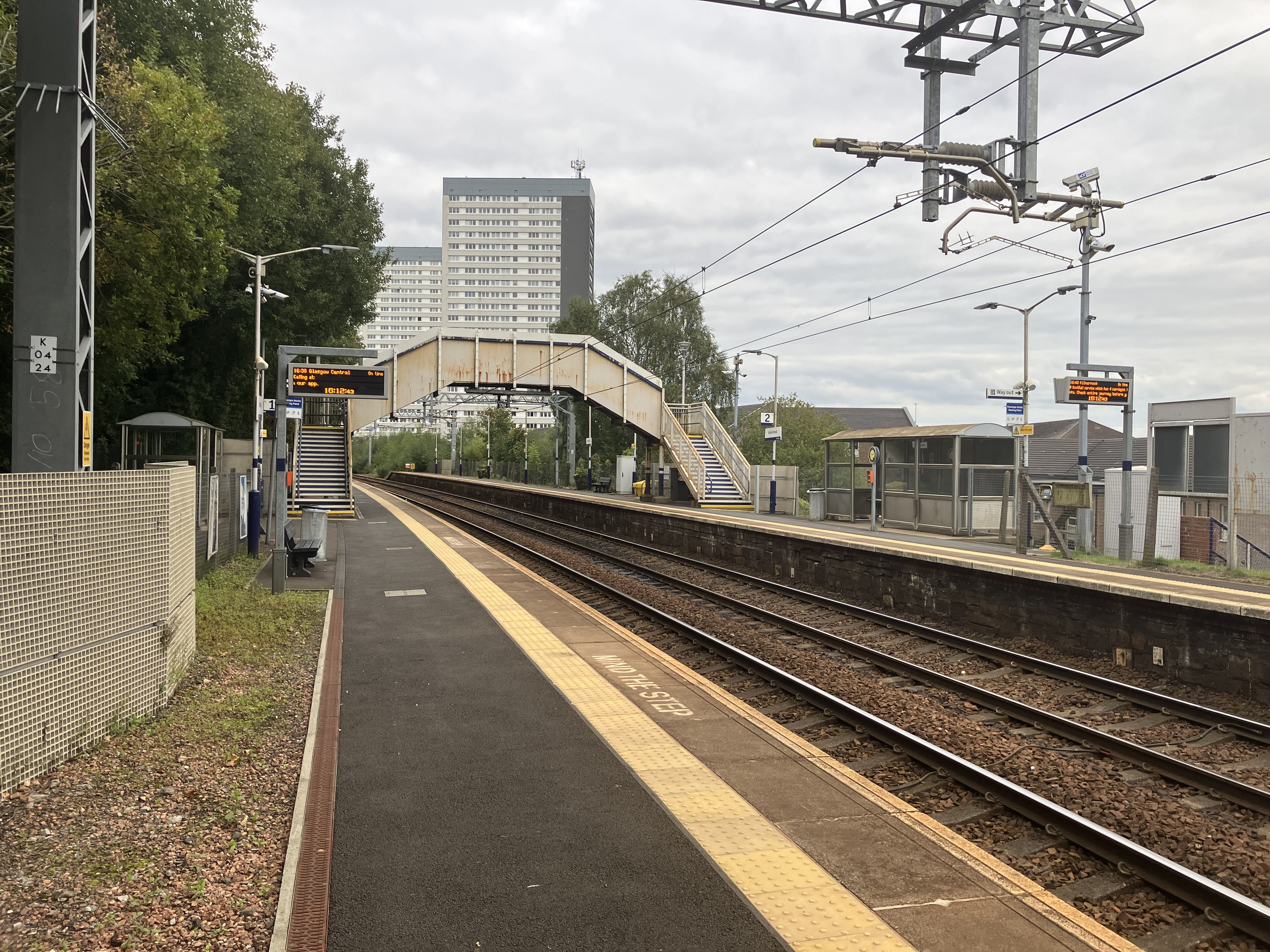

General information
- Location: Kennishead, Glasgow; Scotland
- Coordinates: 55.8134°N 4.3247°W
- Grid reference: NS543602
- Managed by: ScotRail
- Transit authority: SPT
- Platforms: 2

Other information
- Station code: KNS

History
- Original company: Glasgow, Barrhead and Kilmarnock Joint Railway

Key dates
- 27 September 1848: Opened as Crofthead
- 1 August 1850: Renamed Kennishead (Thornliebank)
- 1 May 1852: Renamed Kinnishead and Speirsbridge
- 1 January 1855: Renamed Kennishead and Speirsbridge
- 1 May 1859: Renamed Kennishead

Passengers
- 2020/21: ▼24,510
- 2021/22: ▲61,740
- 2022/23: ▲81,370
- 2023/24: ▲92,134
- 2024/25: ▲0.158 million
Location
Notes
- Passenger statistics from the Office of Rail and Road

Kennishead railway station is a railway station in Kennishead, a district of Glasgow, Scotland. The station is managed by ScotRail and is on the Glasgow South Western Line, 4 1/4 miles (6.8 km) south of Glasgow Central.

== Facilities ==
The station is unstaffed and has only basic amenities (waiting shelters, bench seating and a customer help point on each platform). Train running information is also offered via digital CIS displays, timetable posters and automated announcements. No level access is available to either platform – both entrances have steep ramps from the street and the footbridge linking them has steps.

Three bike racks can also be located on Platform 2, which are uncovered.

== Services ==
The station has a half-hourly service in each direction on weekdays (hourly in the evenings, which extends to Kilmarnock, with one Monday to Friday only extending to Dumfries), to Glasgow and Barrhead/Kilmarnock, alternating every 30 minutes. Connections for stations to Kilmarnock and the south are available at Barrhead when not on a through train.

Kilmarnock services run through this station non-stop every hour in each direction during the day, only stopping at Barrhead and Glasgow Central.

As of 19 February 2023, on Sundays, there is an hourly service in each direction between Glasgow Central and Kilmarnock, calling all stations, with one of these services extending to Carlisle.

Preceding station	National Rail	Following station
Priesthill & Darnley	ScotRail; Glasgow South Western Line	Pollokshaws West
	Historical railways	
Nitshill	Caledonian and Glasgow & South Western Railways; Glasgow, Barrhead and Kilmarnock Joint Railway	Pollokshaws West
