= Barony and Castle of Giffen =

Barony in the former District of Cunninghame, now North Ayrshire

Giffen Castle
- Barrmill, North Ayrshire, Scotland; UK grid reference NS377507
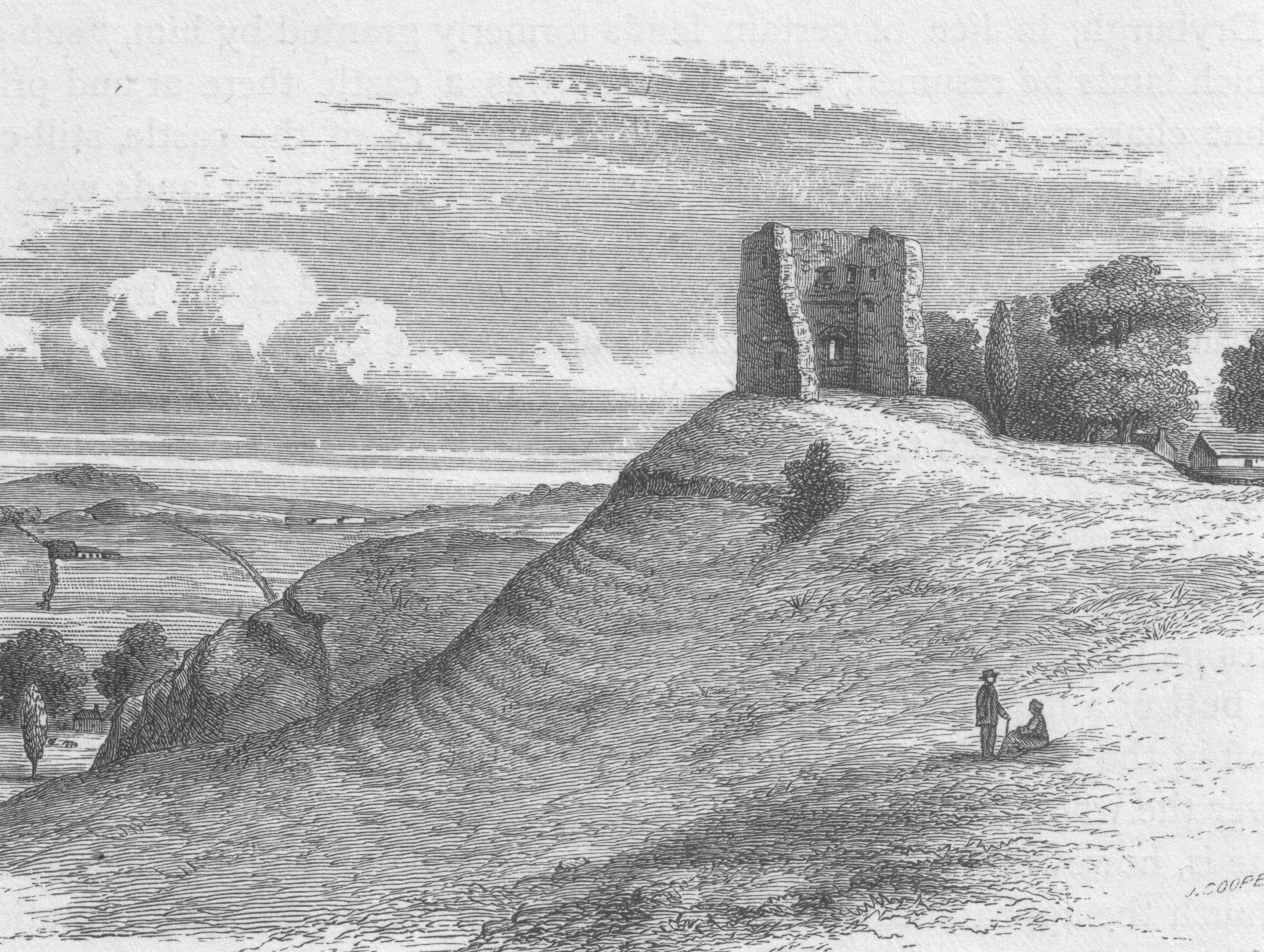
- Giffen castle in 1835 with the buildings of Mains of Giffen visible to the right-hand side

Site information
- Owner: Giffen Mains Farm
- Controlled by: Montgomery clan
- Open to the public: Private
- Condition: No clear remains

Location
- Shown within Scotland
- Location within Scotland
- Coordinates: 55.7229°N 4.5849°W
- Height: 40ft

Site history
- Built: 15th century
- In use: Until 18th century
- Materials: stone

The Barony of Giffen and its associated 15th-century castle were in the parish of Beith in the former District of Cunninghame, now North Ayrshire. The site may be spelled Giffen or Giffin and lay within the Lordship of Giffin, which included the Baronies of Giffen, Trearne, Hessilhead, Broadstone, Roughwood and Ramshead; valued at £3,788 9s 10d. The Barony of Giffen comprised a number of properties, including Greenhills, Thirdpart, Drumbuie, Nettlehirst and Balgray, covering about half of the parish of Beith. Giffen was a hundred merk land, separated from the Barony of Beith, a forty-pound land, by the Powgree Burn which rises on Cuff hill. The Lugton Water or the Bungle Burn running through Burnhouse may have been the Giffen barony boundary with that of the adjacent barony and lands of Aiket castle.

Giffen has a recorded history that covers many familiar aspects of a feudal barony, including the possession of a moot hill or justice hill, here represented by 'Greenhills', as well as a thirled mill and a 'gathering place' known as the 'Borestone'. Other features such as the old chapel and the holy well add to the expected features, most of which no longer survive.

== Etymology ==
Giffen is a Brittonic place name. It is named either from *cemno, meaning "ridge" (cf. Welsh cefn), much like The Chevin in West Yorkshire, England, or *cöfin, a word adopted from Latin meaning "a common/shared boundary" (Welsh cyffin).

== The history of Giffen Castle ==
The 40-foot-high (12 m) tower castle of Giffen lay near to the existing Mains of Giffen site on the 180-foot-high (55 m) summit of a whinstone trap ridge at (NS 37727 50718). MacGibbon and Ross suggest that Giffen Castle was built in the 15th century, although the 13th-century (1233) land grant to Walter de Mulcaster, and the prior existence of a chapel, suggest that a defensive structure of some sort was present at that date. At the time of Pont's survey (J Dobie 1876), it was a tower 30 ft (9.1 m) square, 40 ft (12 m) high, with walls 6 ft (1.8 m) thick. It fell into disrepair soon after 1726 and finally collapsed in 1838. It has also been recorded as 'Griffen' on some old maps of the district.

Etymology
The Anglo-Saxon name Giffin comes from 'Giff', a pet form of the personal name Geoffrey. This pet form is supplemented by the diminutive suffix -on or -in.

The castle was acquired by Sir John Anstruther in the early 18th century and he is responsible for allowing it to become a ruin, together with the associated Giffen farm. The sundial originally in the Giffen castle garden was sold and was moved eventually to Crummock house, Beith, now demolished. In 1959 the sundial was reported to be located at Craigbet, Renfrewshire. This sundial had its horizontal plane divided by volutes, between which a lion's head alternates with a rose; it was made in 1719 and repaired in 1810.

George King of Giffen Mill was permitted by Robert Craig of Giffen Farm in 1726 to remove the stones he needed to build a dwelling house at the mill. The castle roof was taken off and the interior exposed to the elements.

Local farmhouses were built using stone from the front wall of the castle, which was consequently entirely removed. Above the entrance, with its strong iron door, there had been a carving of a man shooting with a crossbow at what has been called a wild boar. It is not unlikely that this commemorates a feat of bold hunting by a member of the family of Giffen. A similar carving at Linton parish church commemorates just such a feat, for which William the Lion knighted the bowman and bestowed upon him the lands and barony of Linton.

For some years after the roof was removed youths would climb the circular stairs and light a fire on the eve of the feast of St Ennan, the saint of the parish.

In 1837 the castle's south wall fell and finally on 12 April 1838, during the silence of the night, the north and east walls of the old castle fell leaving little more than a disorderly heap of stones. The adjacent Mains of Giffen farm had been feued by Anstruther to Robert Craig in 1726. John King of 'Giffin Miln' built his house using stone from the castle and this is probably how the old carvings came to be incorporated into the walls of this building. The doorjambs are also said to have come from the old castle. Thomas Craig, grandson of Robert, passed on the feu to Thomas White in 1816, during whose possession the castle met its final fall, inspiring the following indignant poem by James Wilson, the local poet:

"Hard-hearted misers worship dust,
Their covetous mind is little worth,
Secured in chains for mammon's curse,
The older they grow worse and worse!"

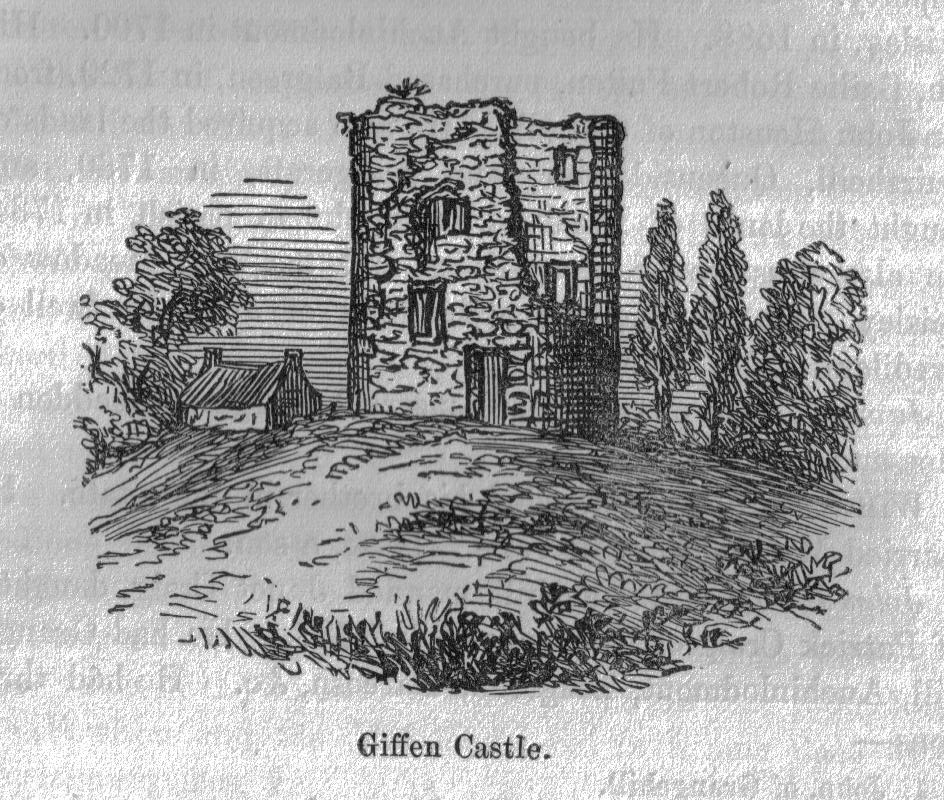
Giffen castle in the 1800s with what is probably the old Giffen Farm, just visible to the left-hand side

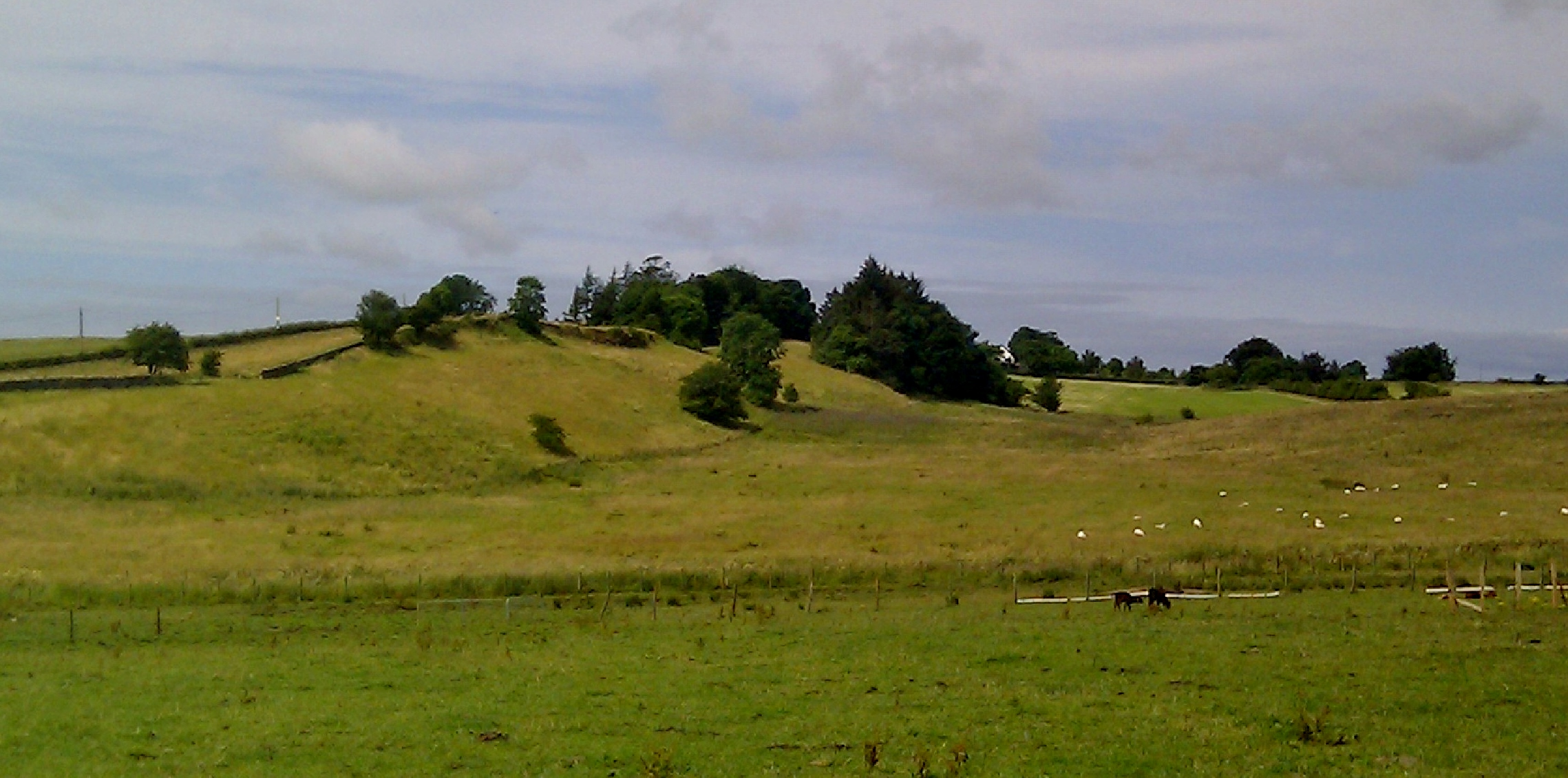
The Giffen Craigs and Bank of Giffen from Burnhouse Manor Farm.

In August 1956 the OS reported that the remains of Giffen Castle now consist of three fragments of rubble masonry, the largest portion measuring 4.0 m long by 2.0 m thick and 1.9 m high. The remainder of the castle was demolished in about 1920 when the adjoining quarry was dug.

In June 1983 the OS visited the site again and stated that there are no remains of the castle in situ. The three fragments of masonry are in fact large tumbled blocks, and together with a mass of loose shaped stone, also from the castle, form a garden rockery. A marriage stone lintel above the doorway of the adjacent Mains house is inscribed RC MC 1758. This appears contemporaneous to the single-storey house and of doubtful association with the old castle.

Mr. Robert King, the farmer of the lands near Giffen castle, reported in the 1890s that when digging drains to the north-east of the castle he came across a large number of bones, which tradition says were there as a result of a battle fought by the lord of the castle, his retainers and an attacking party. The bones were in a hollow to the west of the castle, and between it and the high ground on which the castle and hamlet of Giffen stood. Metal detectorists found a number of musket-balls in this area.

=== Giffen House ===
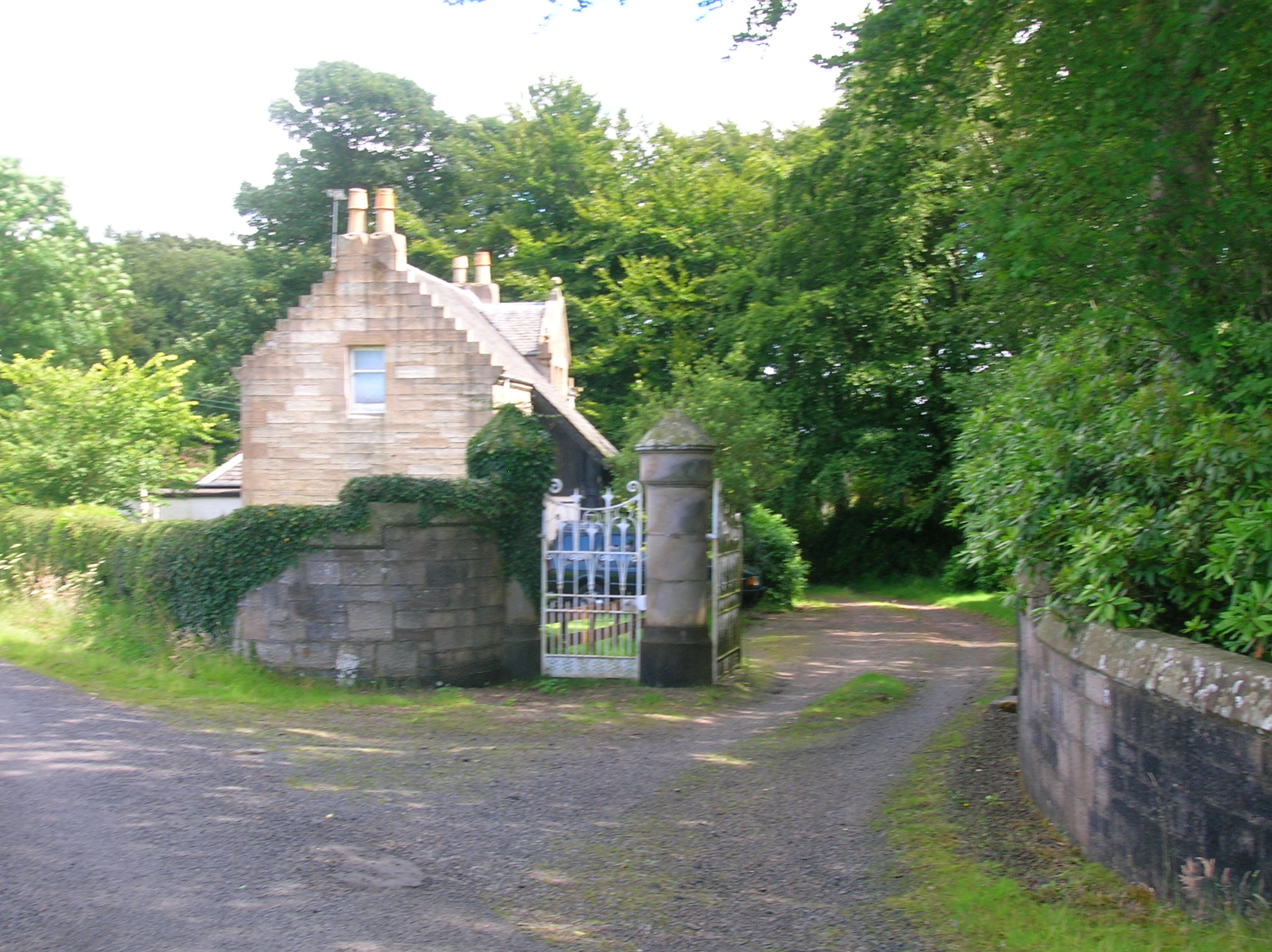
The entrance to Giffen House

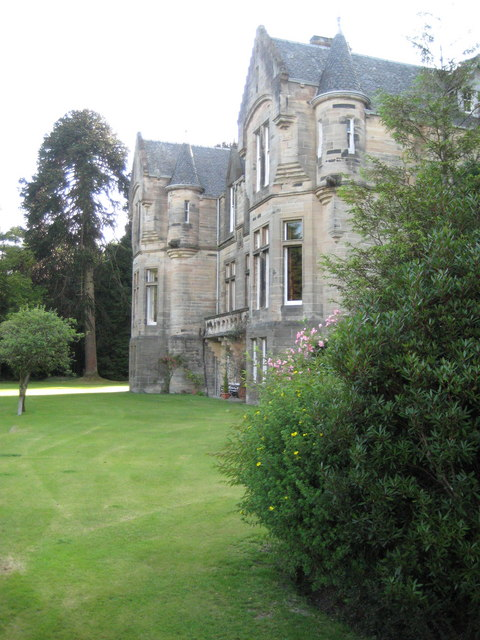
Giffen House

William Patrick Esq. of Roughwood and Woodside, a descendant of the ancient family of the Ayrshire Patricks, purchased the mid-superiority of Giffen from the Earl of Eglinton in 1855 and also acquired the dominum utile of much of the barony. In 1861 his grandnephew, Henry Gardiner Patrick, son of John Shedden Patrick of Trearne and Woodside, succeeded to the property and built a large and handsome mansion-house in the Scottish Baronial style on the lands of Bankhead farm, a little over two miles (3 km) from the old Castle of Giffen.

Giffen Castle and Stables was designed in 1869 by John Murray Robertson working in the Dundee office of Andrew and Thomas Arthur Heiton. The building was classified under the category of "Castle" and is a Historic Scotland 'B Listed' building.

Giffen House had been completed for about 50 years when the owner, Mr. Patrick, died in August 1922, leaving the Estate to a nephew in Edinburgh. The nephew sold the estate, which extended to about 885 1/2 acres, chiefly arable and enclosed land, but it included about 54 1/2 acres of woodland and wooded policies (grounds). It contained 4 public rooms, 6 family bedrooms, 3 dressing rooms, day and night nurseries, bathroom, 6 servants' bedrooms, and ample kitchen and domestic accommodation, making 35 rooms in all. The offices included excellent stabling, garage, lodge, and coachman's house.

=== The Castletoun of Giffen ===
General Roy's survey of 1747-55 spells the name as 'Giffin' and indicates a cluster of buildings, a hamlet, on the southern side of the castle.

=== The Chapels and the Chapel Well ===
The chapel and well lay near to Giffen Castle according to John Smith, however another chapel and well dedicated to St. Bridget existed at Trearne on a low hill, with an associated burial ground and a nook in which was set a carving of two figures, possibly a cat and a rabbit, measuring 25 inches (640 mm) by 15 inches (380 mm). The chapel ruins at Trearne were destroyed by quarrying in comparatively recent times. The quarry workers started coming across graves as they worked closer to the chapel and oddly the bodies were found buried face down.

In the 12th century the Laird, William de Nenham, had granted land to the monastery of Dryburgh and a chapel was built to the south-east of the castle, possibly next to the well which is still marked on the 2001 OS map, known locally as the Chapel Well. William's son Richard granted more land at this site, however his brother Alexander inherited and wished for his chapel to be held by the monastery of Kilwinning and not Dryburgh. To achieve this end he gave land for a site at Trearne, next to St. Bridget's chapel which had previously been granted to the Monks of Dryburgh.

The Barony chapel at Trearne was for the souls of Richard de Morville, William de Morville, Roland of Galloway, Elen de Morville and of their heirs, as well as that of Walter de Mulcaster, his ancestors and his successors. The chapel at Giffen was likely to have been for the same overlords or superiors, but also for Alexander de Nenham, his ancestors and his successors.

This situation of excambied or exchanged lands has led to some confusion in that three chapels appear to have existed at one time within the Lordship of Giffen, not two as is usually stated. The other chapel was in Beith.

Giffen Castle and mill - 2007

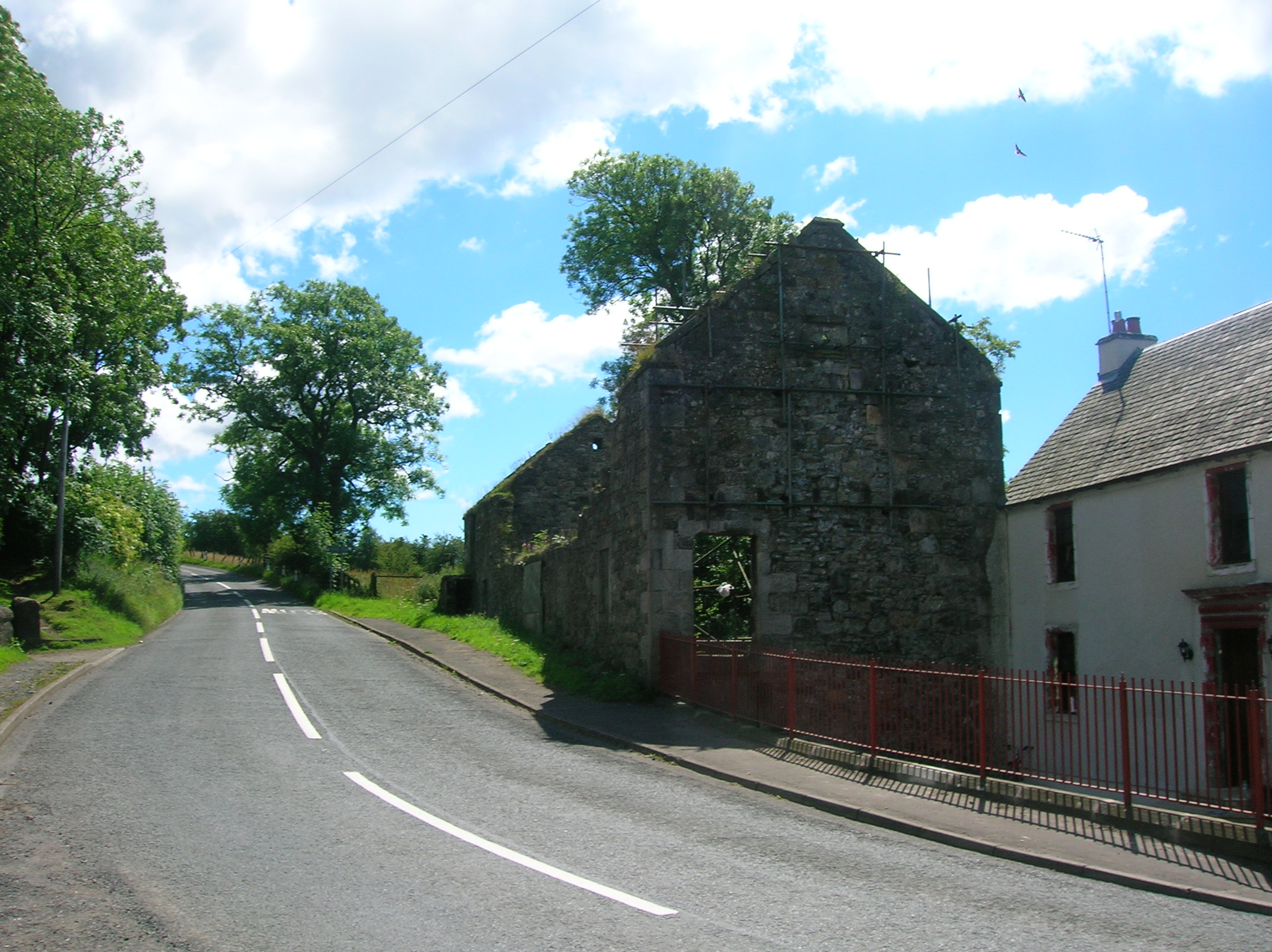
The Giffen mill complex and Giffen brae; the road to Mains of Giffen and Burnhouse

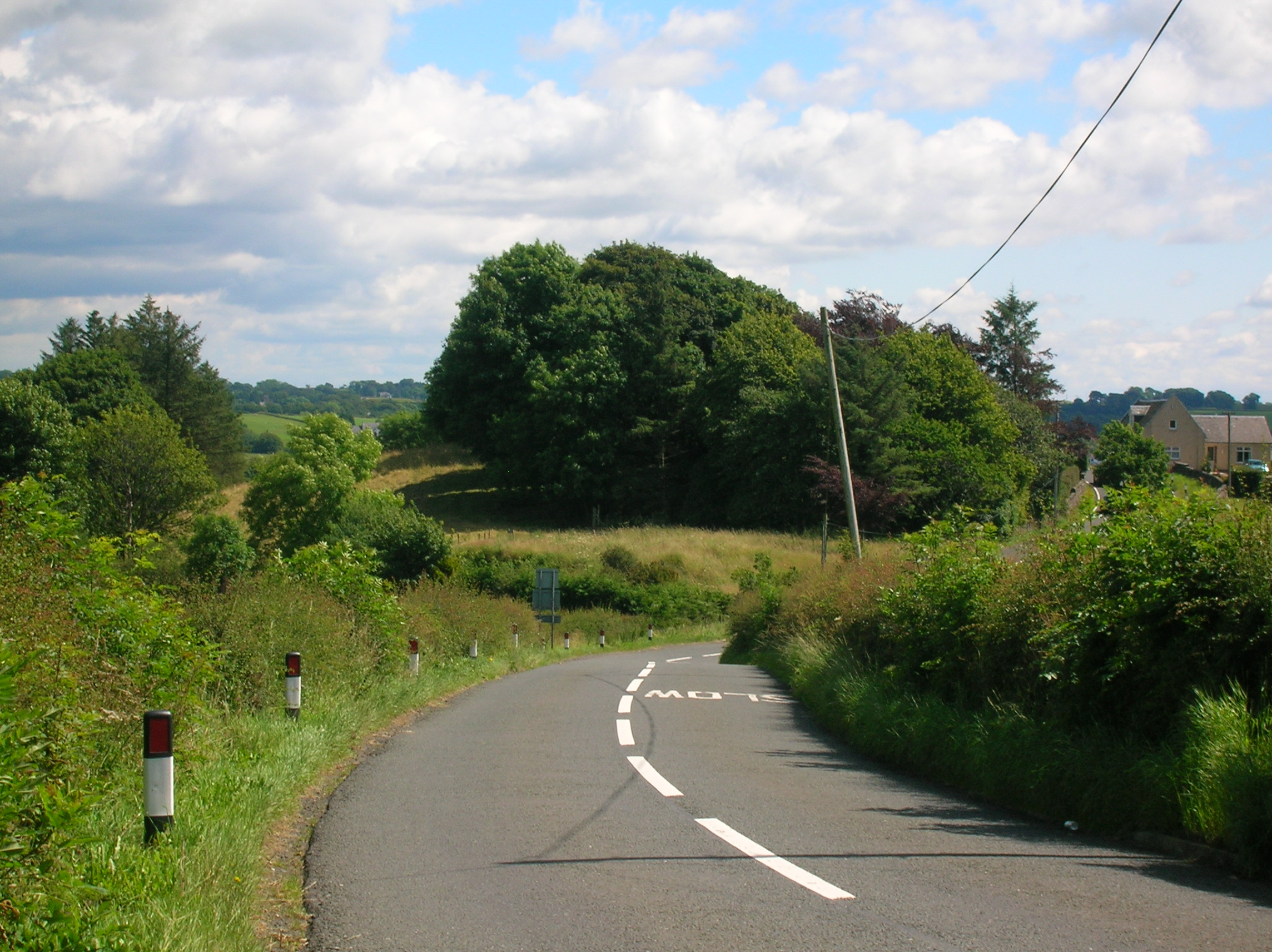
The woodland denotes the site of old Giffen castle. See the 1860s print above as a comparison.

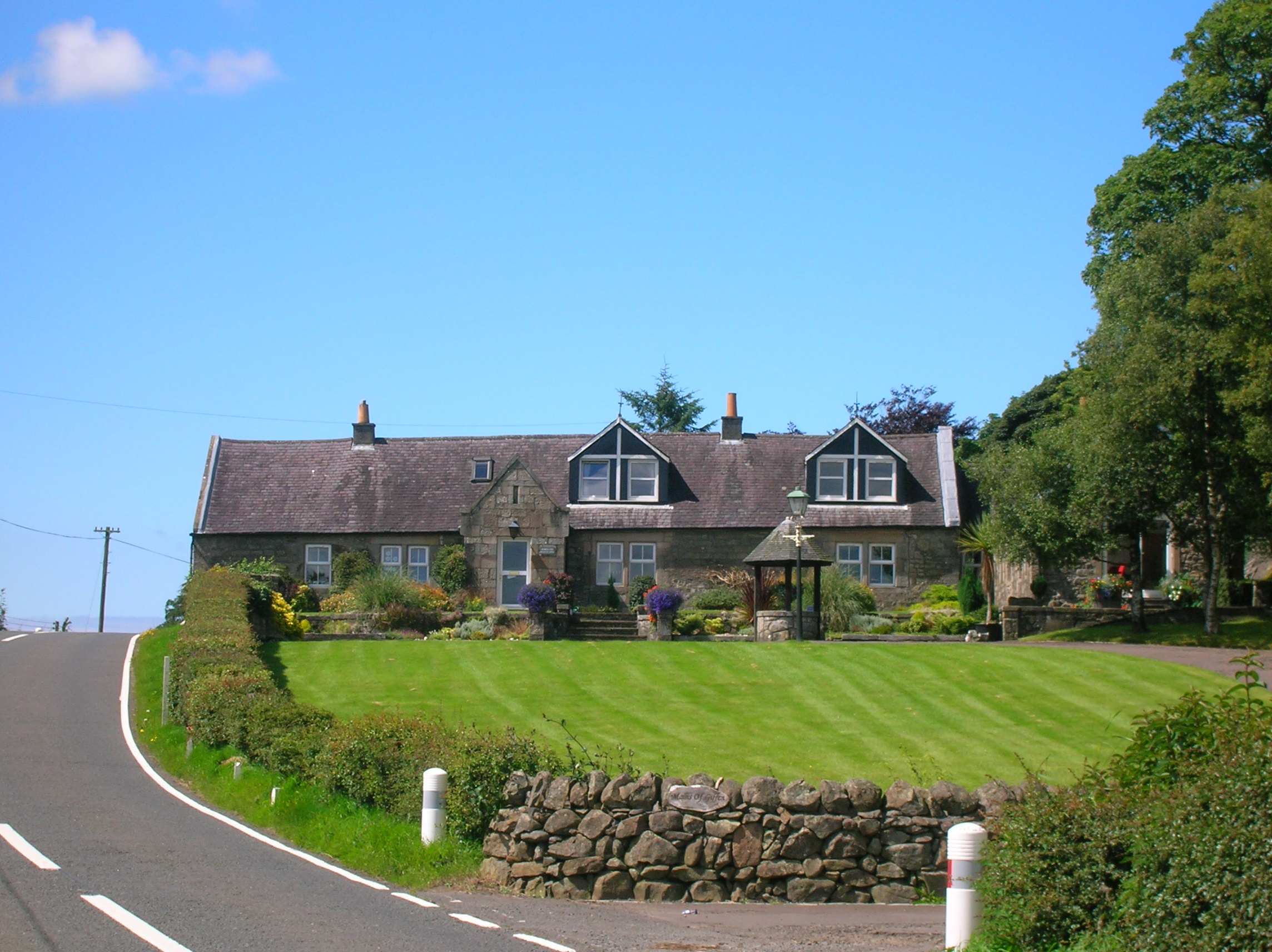
Mains of Giffen, partly built with stones from Giffen castle

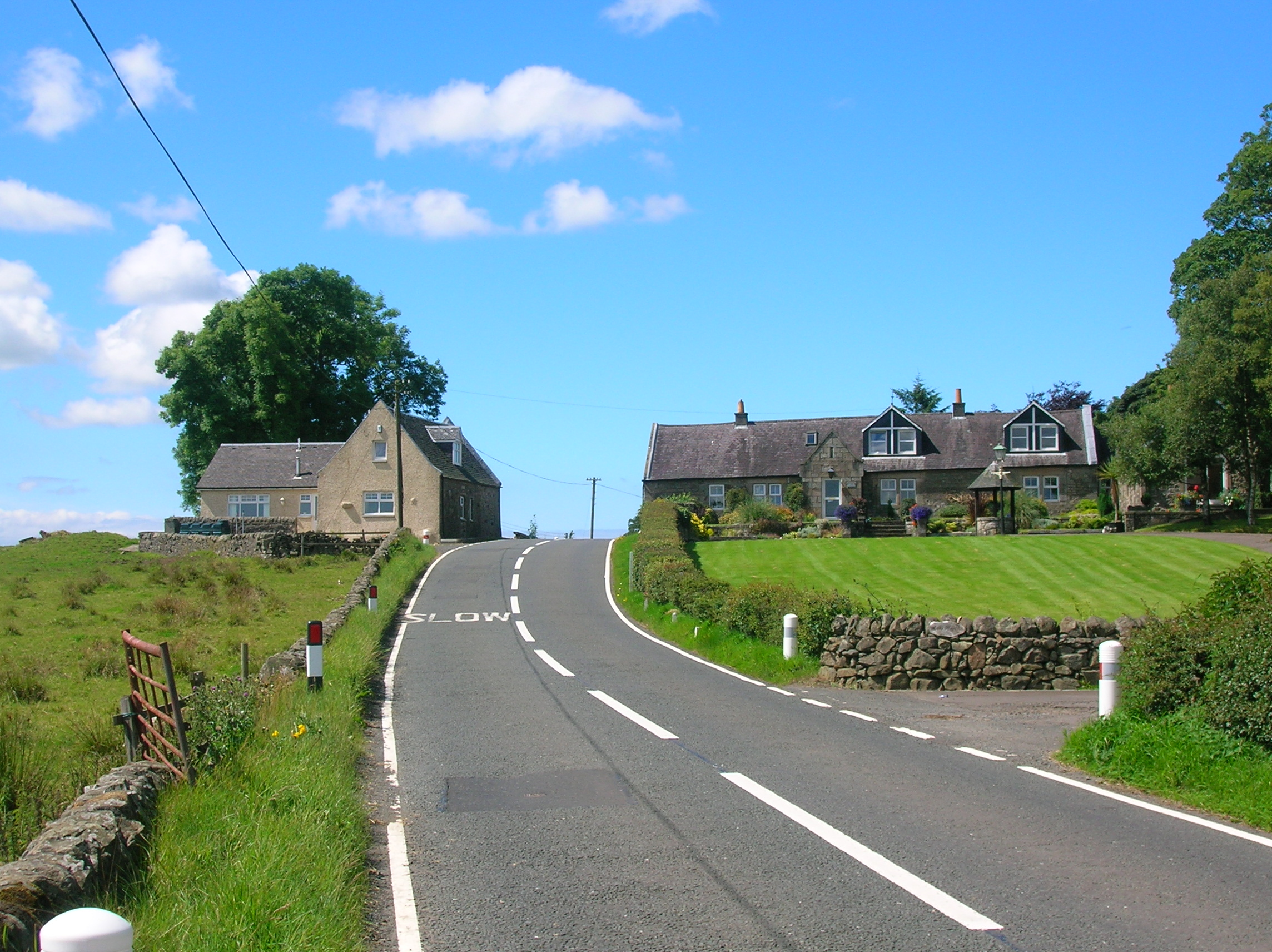
Mains of Giffen with the site of the old 'castletoun' to the left, and the road to Barrmill from Burnhouse

== The Lairds of Giffen ==
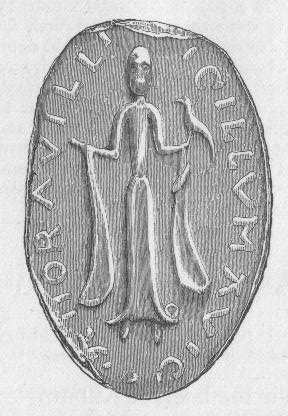
The Seal of Richard De Morville, Lord of Cunninghame and his Lady Avicia

In the 13th century Walter de Mulcaster obtained the lands of 'Giffeyn' as a vassal of the De Morvilles in the reign of William the Lion; and in turn gave them to his sub-vassal, Alexander de Nenham. Alexander gave to the monastery of Dryburgh 50 acres (200,000 m^{2}) which had a chapel and a well to St. Bridget, previously founded by the monastery of Kilwinning, the ruins of which were still to be seen, together with a burial ground. Note that Paterson's version (1866) is at odds with Dobie's (1876) account. The De Morvilles were supporters of John Baliol and upon the succession of Robert the Bruce to the Crown of Scotland they were dispossessed and Giffen reverted to the crown. Sir Hugh de Eglinton married Egidia, sister of Robert II and was given the Lordship in 1370. Giffen then remained in the Montgomerie family for several centuries. The barony seems to have been more or less consistently passed to the Master or heir of Eglinton for many years, however in 1505 the first Earl took the barony into his personal care. After this time the barony passed back and forth amongst the family when cadet lines failed to produce issue.

The 1764 coat of arms of the Montgomeries, Earls of Eglinton

Sir Robert Montgomerie, son of Sir John de Montgomerie of Ardrossan, Baron of Parliament, had been the first Montgomerie of Giffen in around 1400. By charter, dated 9 March 1413, the Regent Albany confirmed the grants made by Sir John of Montgomerie of Ardrossan, Knight, to Robert, his son, of the lordship of Giffen in Kyle Stewart. Various sons inherited and in 1560 Patrick Montgomerie was a member of the Great Parliament which established the Protestant faith in Scotland. He was later banished for a time because of his reformation principles and was succeeded by a daughter who married John Montgomerie of Scotstoun and inherited part of the Giffen lands. Being without further issue the Eglinton Montgomeries, in the person of the Hon. Robert, brother to Hugh, the murdered 4th Earl, inherited the barony, producing an heiress, Margaret. He is said incidentally to have "honourably revenged" his brother's death, killing John Cunninghame of Clonbeith at Hamilton Palace.

Margaret married twice, but had no issue and the barony again reverted to the Eglinton branch. Graysteel was the appellation given to Sir Henry Montgomerie of Giffen (due to his dexterity with the sword) who inherited, however he had no issue and once again the barony reverted, as his wife sold the barony of Giffen to her father-in-law for an annuity of 2,500 merks. Henry had been born in 1614 and Anne of Denmark, James VI's Queen, stood as his godmother. The direct Montgomerie line ended with the 5th. Earl who had married his cousin-German, Margaret, eldest daughter and heiress of Robert Montgomerie of Giffen and Master of Eglinton. Their marriage was so unsuccessful that the Earl took the drastic step of revoking her heritable rights as gained through their marriage. and Alexander Seton of Foulstruther, also called 'Grey steel,' took the Montgomerie name upon becoming the 6th Earl of Eglintoun in 1612.

The seventh Earl's second son, The Right Hon. Francis inherited and lived an eventful life. He was one of the Lords of the Privy Council, and a Commissioner of the Treasury, in the reign of William III and Queen Anne. He was appointed in 1706 as one of the Commissioners for Scotland for the Treaty of Union. Francis acquired the estate of Hessilhead and built an addition to the old tower as well as slating the roof, making it one of the finest properties in the district on behalf of his eldest son, Lieut.-Colonel John Montgomerie of Giffen, whilst continuing to live at Giffen for the remainder of his life.

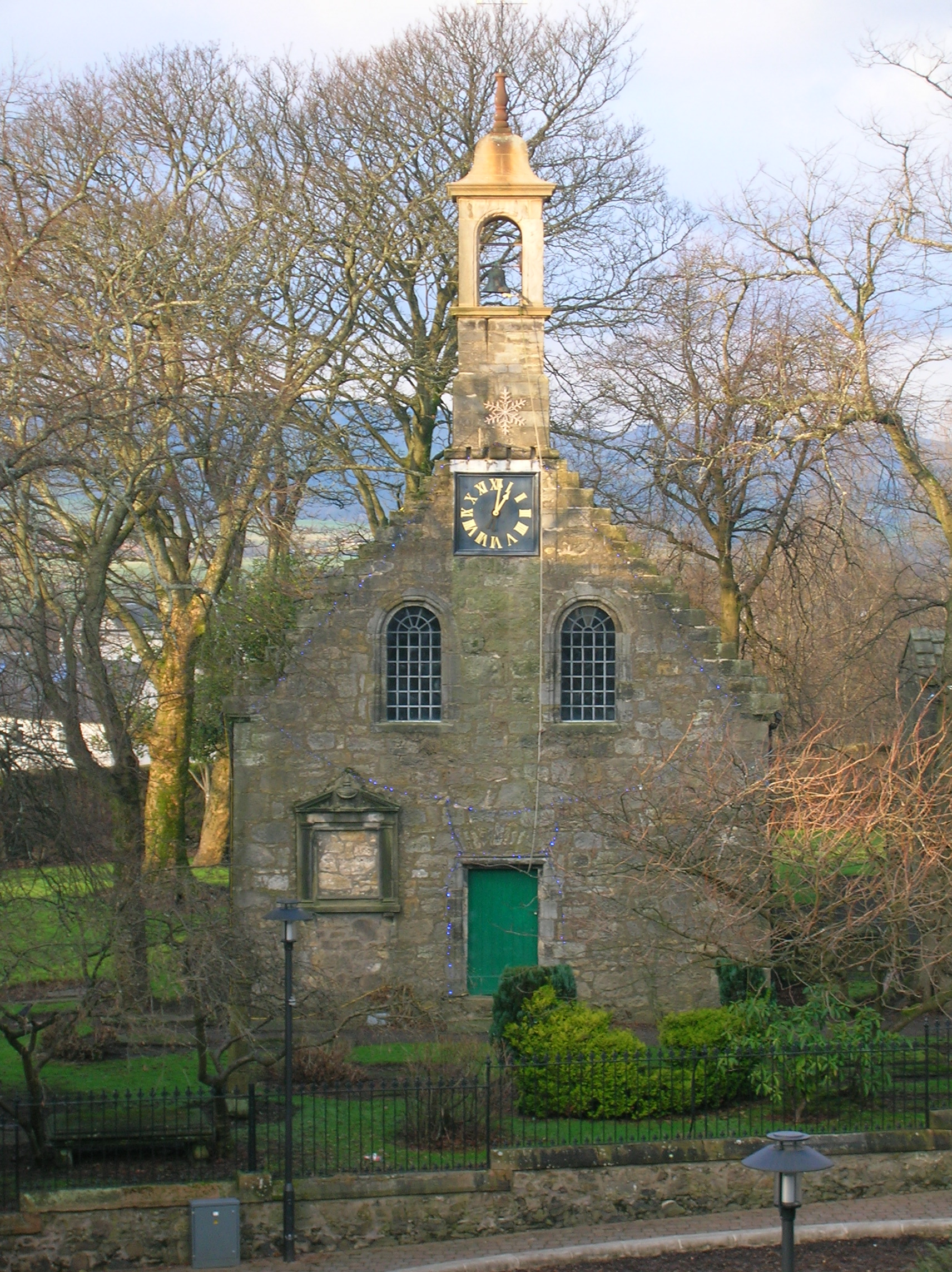
Beith Auld kirk

Henry married a granddaughter of Alexander Leslie, Earl of Leven the favourite General of Gustavus Adolphus, King of Sweden. She died in her prime and a certain highly valuable jewel, given to her grandfather by the Swedish king and which was to be passed only through her family came into the possession of Henry. The 6th Earl of Leven instigated legal proceedings which eventually saw the jewel returned to the Leslie family. In 1697 Francis was made one of the commissioners looking into witchcraft following the Christian Shaw case. Five out of 24 accused persons were burned at the stake. The Act of Union was very unpopular in some quarters. A song of 1706 on the Union reads:-

"There's Roseberry, Glasgow, and Dupplin,
And Lord Archibald Campbell and Ross,
The President, Francis Montgomery,
Wha ambles liked any paced horse."

In another, called "Lines upon the Rogues in Parliament", is the following stanza:-

"Thou Francis of Giffen thou's bigot as hell,
And Brodie in nonsense in this doth excell,
For rebellion engrained you may each bear the bell,
Wherefore sin on and be damned."

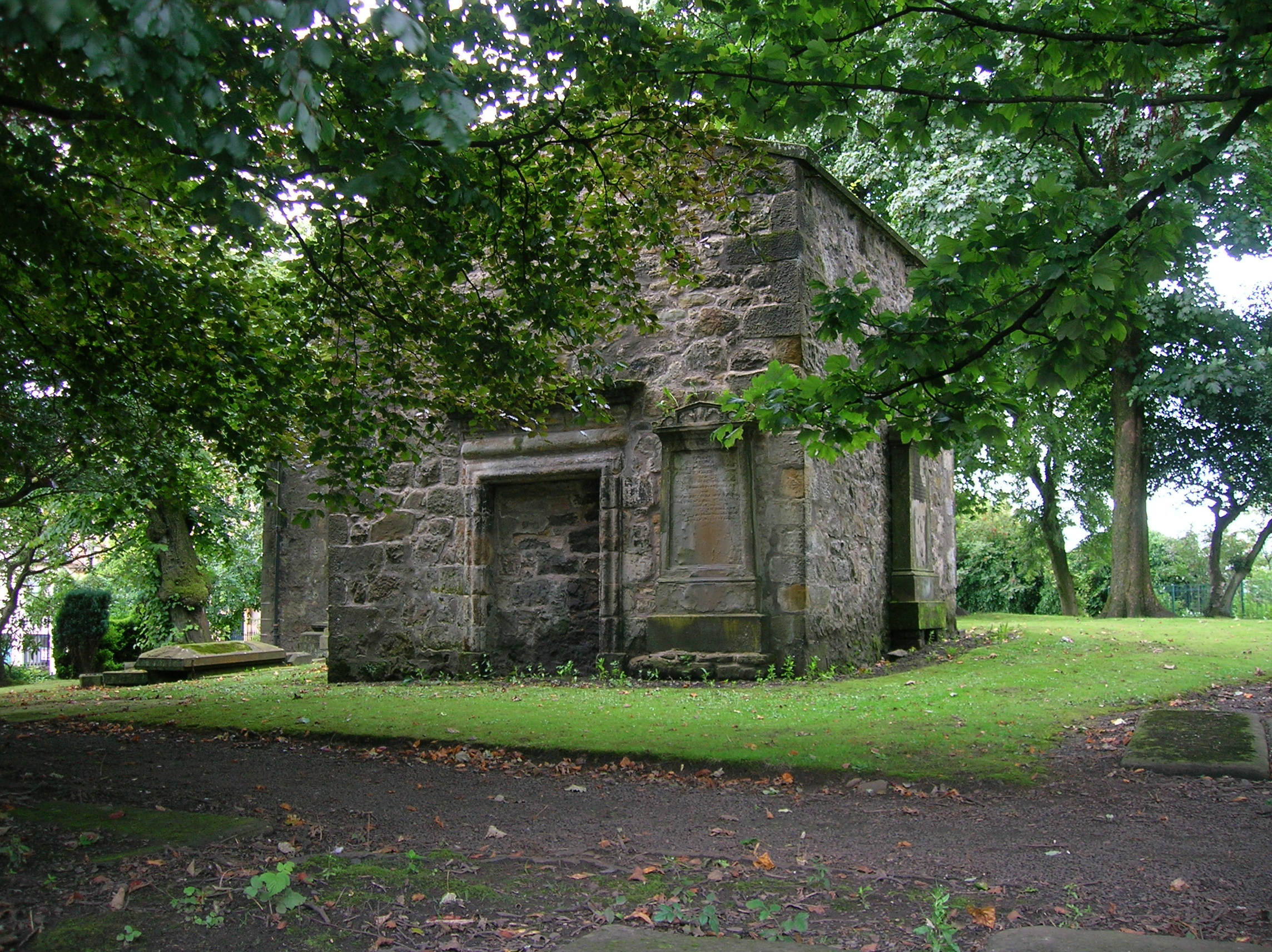
The old Giffen aisle at Beith Auld Kirk

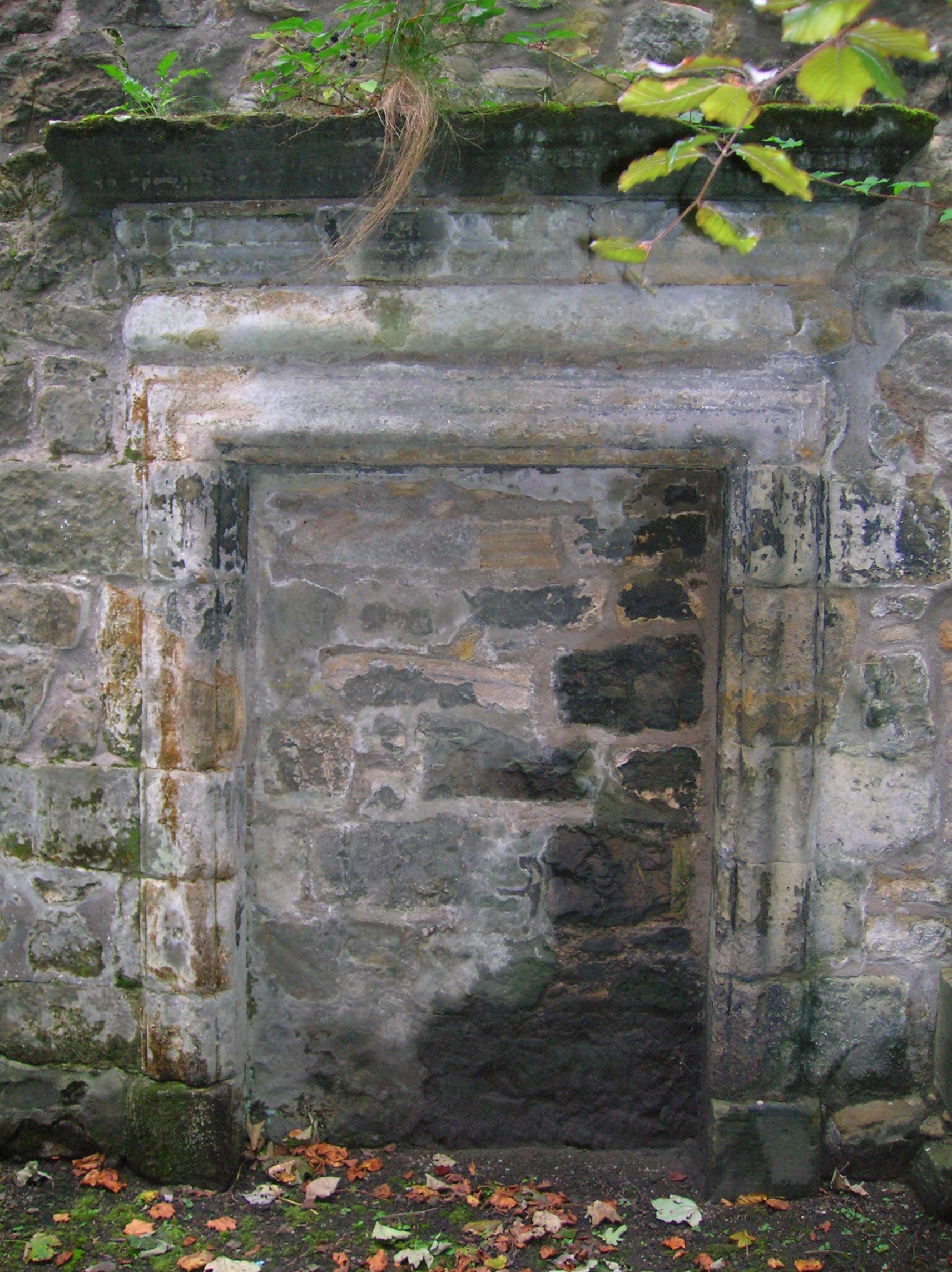
The blocked up Giffen Aisle doorway

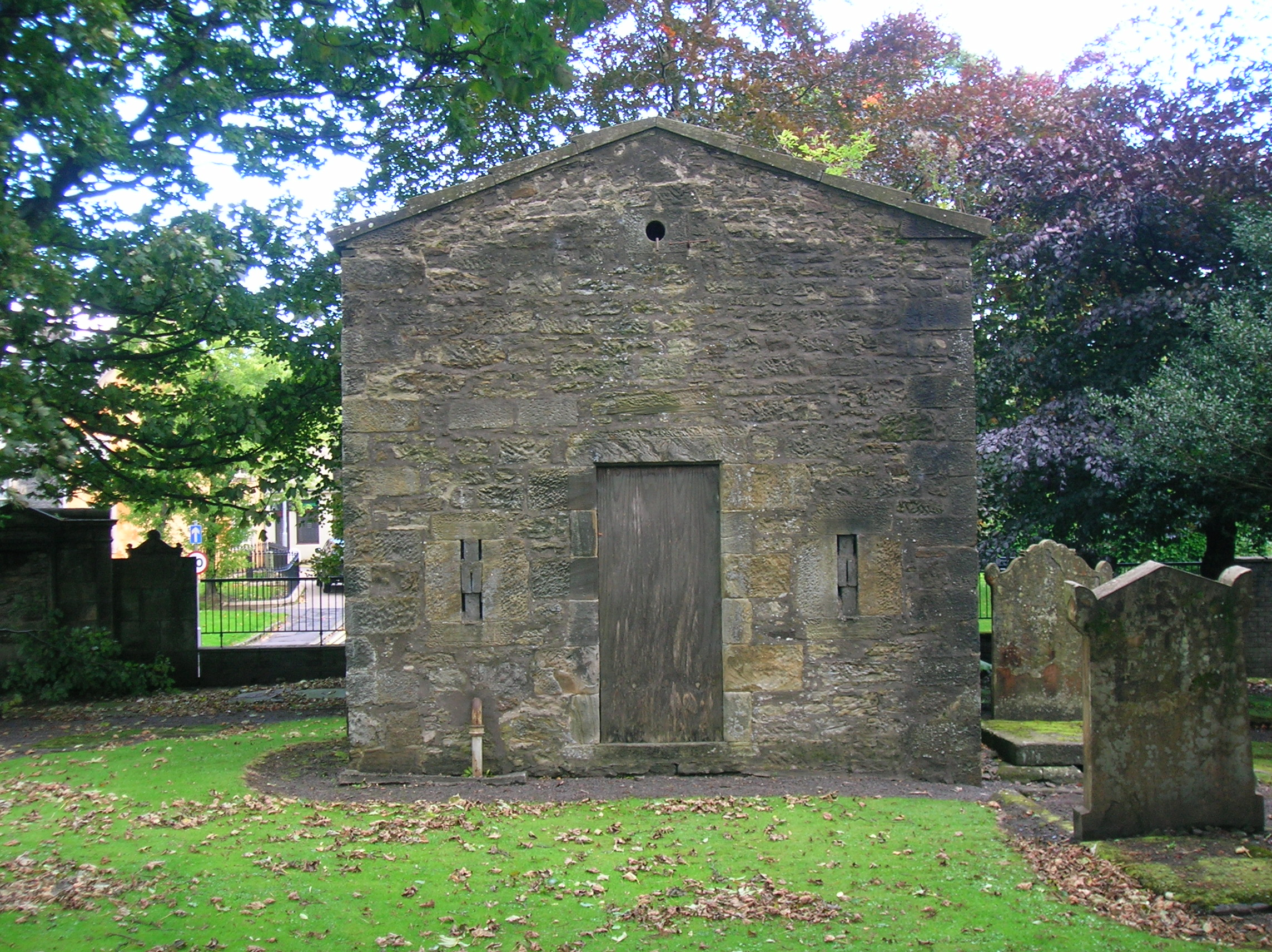
The old church end of the aisle

Upon the death in October 1709 of George Allardyce, Master of the Scottish Mint, John was appointed to the post. He went on to become the MP for Ayr at the 1710 General election, and became one of the Gentleman of the bedchamber to George II, when Prince of Wales. John Montgomerie seems to have been totally uninterested in the affairs of the mint and his personal finances were in some disarray. He at one point proposed an exchange of his post at the mint for a commission in the Foot Guards and ended up with both. He fought in the war against France and was at the disastrous battle of Almanza in Spain. In June 1717 he assigned his salary to a third party, having withdrawn from any active involvement. In 1727 he was appointed as Governor of New York, where he remained until his death on 1 July 1731. He had a daughter Elizabeth, and upon his death the line of the Montgomerie of Giffen became extinct. He had been forced to sell his estates and it was Sir John Anstruther of the Balcaskie family, who purchased Giffen in 1722, under the burden of liferent as Francis was still living. As Fullarton puts it the large and valuable estate of Giffen, is now broken down into a multitude of inglorious fragments, with scarcely a possibility of its ever again being restored and cemented into its original dignity and beneficial condition.

The Montgomerie of Giffen coat of arms was quarterly, first and fourth Montgomery, second and third Eglinton; over all, dividing the quarters, a cross waved or, and in chief a label of three points of the last.

Loch Brand near Gateside was once the property of the monks of Kilwinning Abbey and it is recorded that in 1482 the monks took legal action against the Montgomeries of Giffin Castle and James Ker who were accused of dangerous destruction and down-casting of the fosses and dikes of the loch called Loch Brand.

== The Giffen Baron-court ==
Robert Montgomerie of Giffen was Chamberlain and then Baron-Baillie of the Giffen Baron-court from 1677 to 1681. Another Robert was the Procurator-Fiscal of the same court. Robert Montgomerie of Bogston was a factor and Baron-Bailie of the Giffen Barony-court in the late 17th century.

=== The armorial bearings of the Barony of Giffen ===
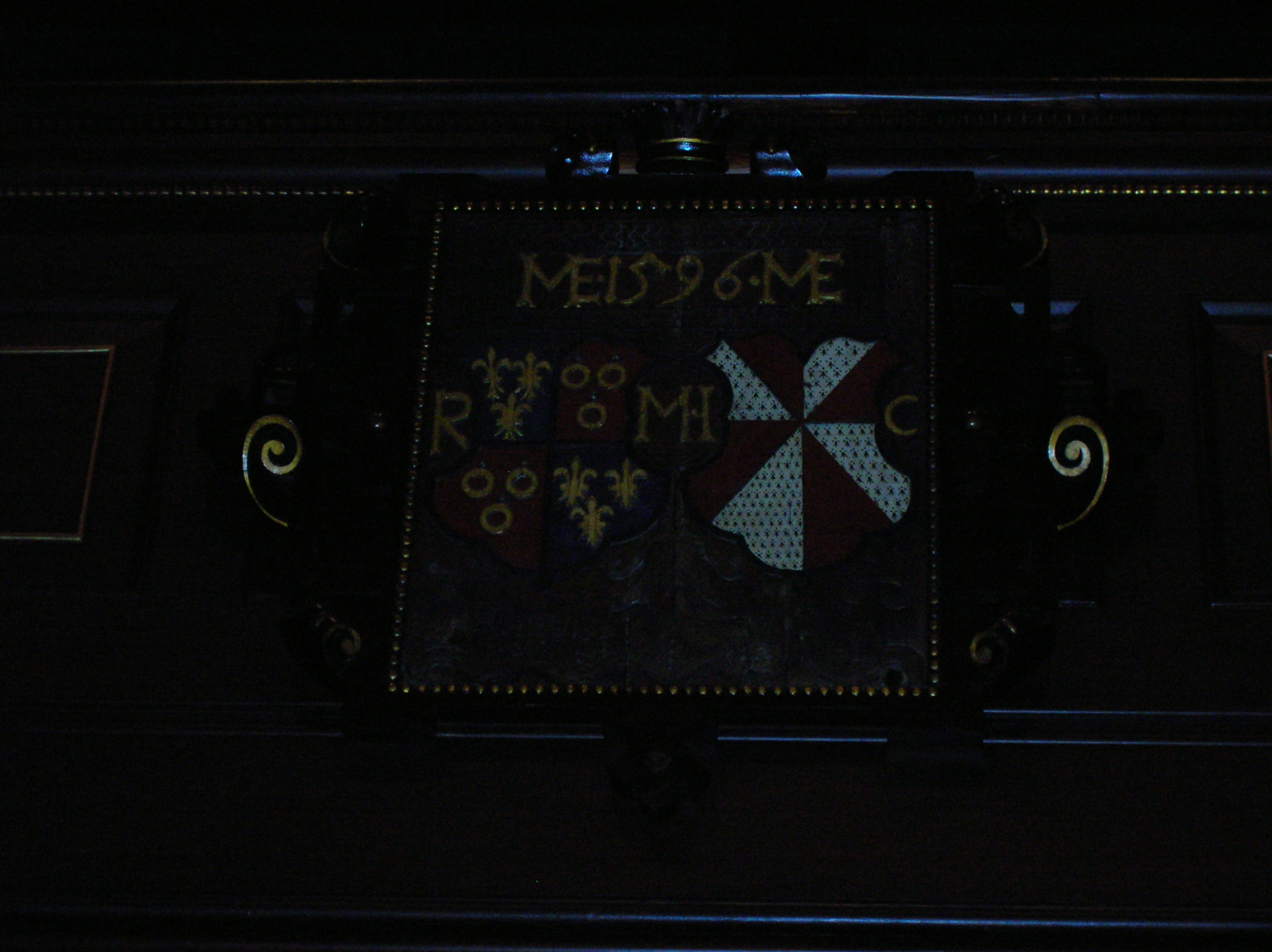
Detail of the Coat of arms of the Barony of Giffen from the Auld Kirk, now in the Beith Kirk built in 1807

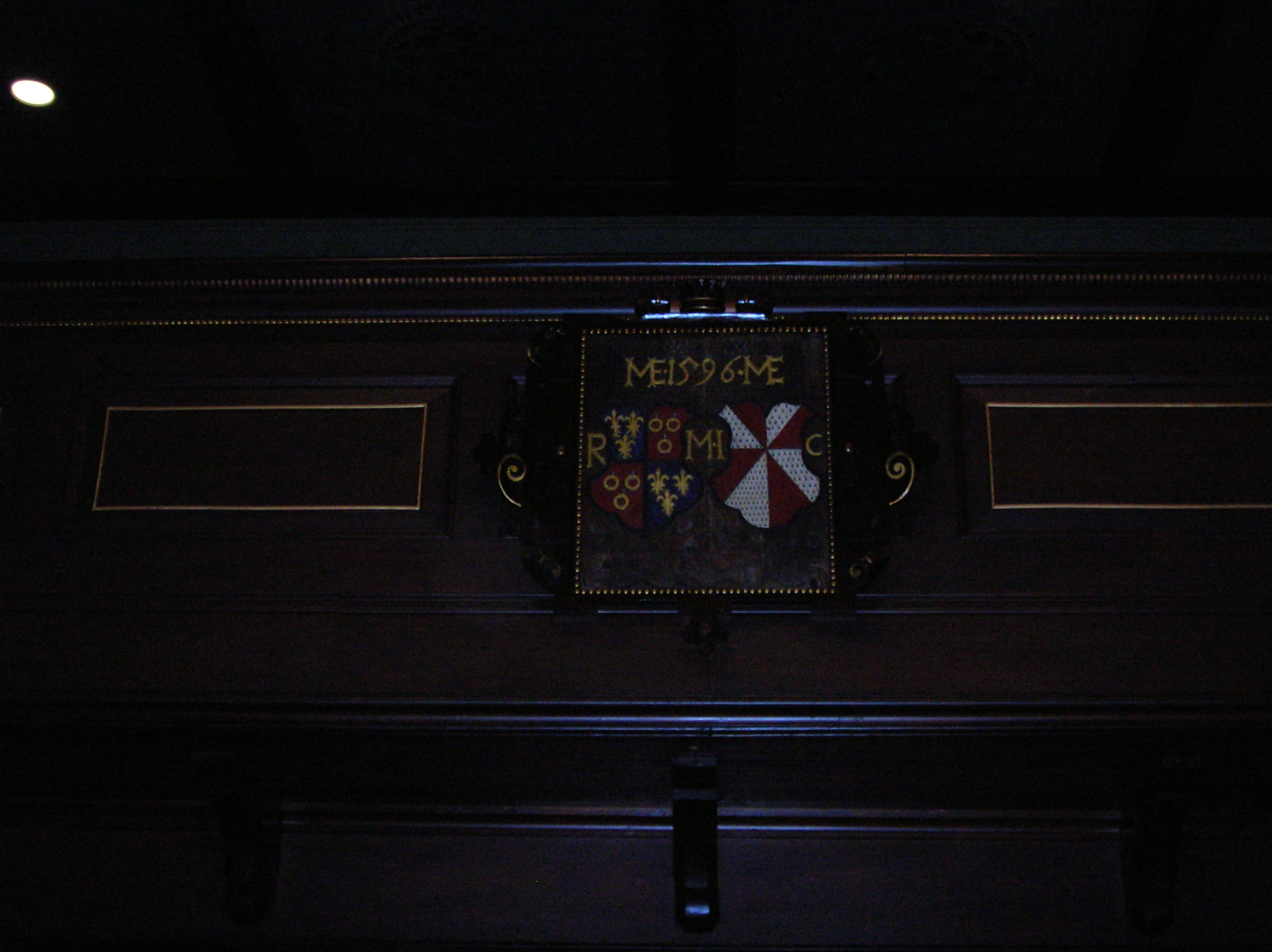
The Barony of Giffen coat of arms

This coat of arms used to be in the Auld Beith Kirk, in the Giffen loft. The Giffen aisle at the Auld Kirk still stands. The coat of armorial bearings were moved to the new Beith Kirk in 1807. RC is Robert Montgomerie, brother to the murdered Hugh, 4th Earl of Eglinton. JC is for Jean Campbell, his wife, daughter of Sir Matthew Campbell of Loudoun. The conjoined MEs either side of the date are for 'Master of Eglintoun', the title which he bore as second son of Hugh, the 3rd Earl, and heir presumptive to his nephew Hugh, the fifth earl; the date is that of his death.

=== The Darien Affair ===
The Darien Scheme was an attempt by the Scots, led by William Paterson (the founder of the Bank of England), in the 1690s to set up a trading colony in Central America in the late 1690s, however the opposition from England and elsewhere was so great that the attempt failed with huge losses and great financial implications for the country and for individuals. Half of the whole circulating capital of Scotland was subscribed and mostly lost, although the Act of Union in 1707 made provision for a degree of compensation to be paid to the Darien subscribers. In Cunninghame some examples of losses are Frances Montgomerie of Giffin (£1000), Major James Cunninghame of Aiket (£200), Sir William Cunninghame of Cunninghamhead (£1000), and James Thomson of Hill in Kilmaurs (£100). In modern terms a thousand pounds loss in the 17th century must have been a devastating blow to the family finances.

== Giffen Mill ==
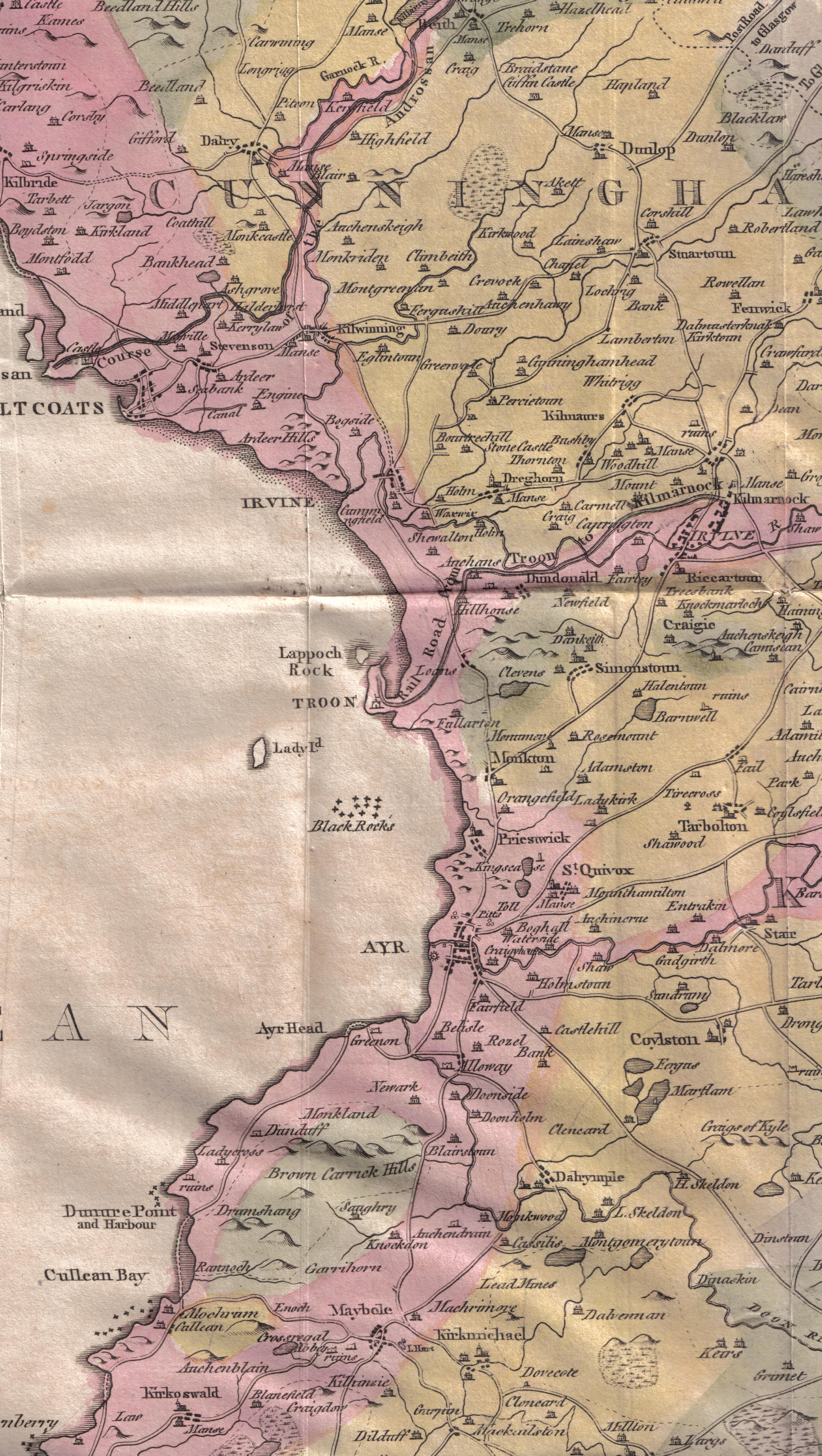
William Aiton's 1811 map showing Giffin

The Location of Giffen Castle

The old feudal or barony mill, also known as Barmill, Barrmill or Baroil is at Map reference: NS 3699 5133. The remains visible today are early 19th-century, probably rebuilt on an old site, when grain prices were driven up by the Napoleonic Wars. The external stair led to the kiln for drying the corn before it was ground. It was a three-storey, four-bay rubble building on a rectangular plan, now gutted and the upper part used as a store until recently. A small dovecot was in the upper angle of the gable end above the miller's house yard. The mid-18th century substantial miller's house is still occupied and is in good condition. On General Roy's survey of 1747 - 55 Giffin Mill is present with a cluster of buildings nearby. The mill pond and lade are clearly marked on the 1858 OS map and a sand pit is marked nearby. The 1923 - 4 the OS map no longer marks the mill or its lade and mill pond. The machinery was adapted to drive a saw mill before final closure.

Giffen would have been the thirled mill of the barony, thirlage being the feudal law by which the laird (lord) of Giffen could force all those vassals or suckeners living on his lands to bring their grain to his mill to be ground. Additionally the suckeners had to carry out repairs on the mill, maintain the lade and weir as well as conveying new millstones to the site.

Under thirlage the suckeners had to convey new millstones to their thirled mill, sometimes over significant distances, in this case they probably came from West Kilbride. The width of some of the first roads was determined by the requirement to have at least two people on either side of a new grindstone being transported, with a wooden axle called a 'mill-wand' passed through the hole in the centre.

As has already been mentioned, the miller's house had two carved stones from Giffen Castle built into its walls and a further one built into the gable end wall of the mill itself. In 2006/2007 the miller's house was renovated, however the other carved stones were not found during the re-roughcasting; they had been on the front. The grandfather of the present owner had the stones chipped off; they were located either side of the main entrance door. The 'Eagle' on the mill gable end is still in situ (see photograph).

Details of Giffen Mill - 2007

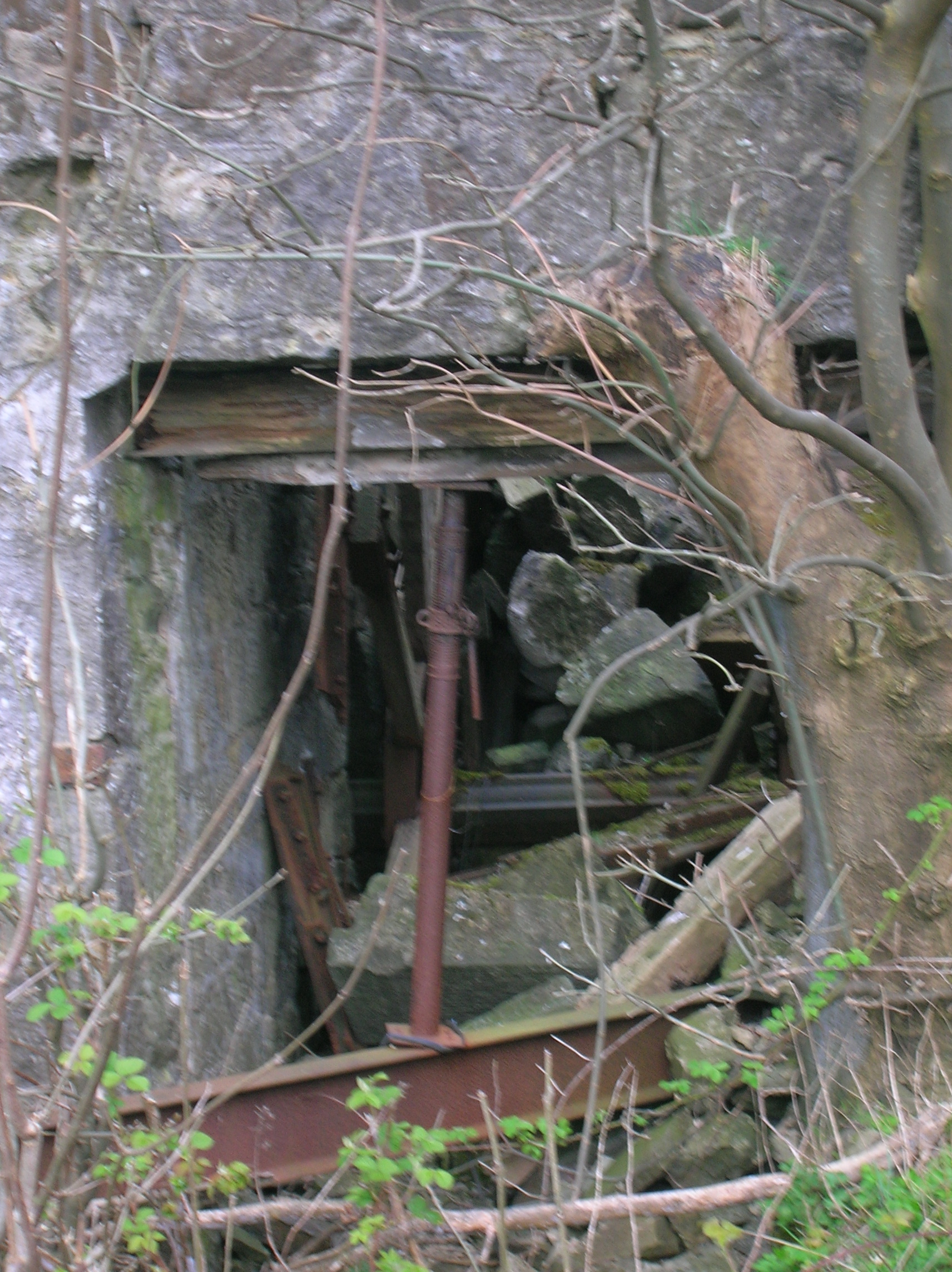
The remains of the waterwheel inside the mill extension

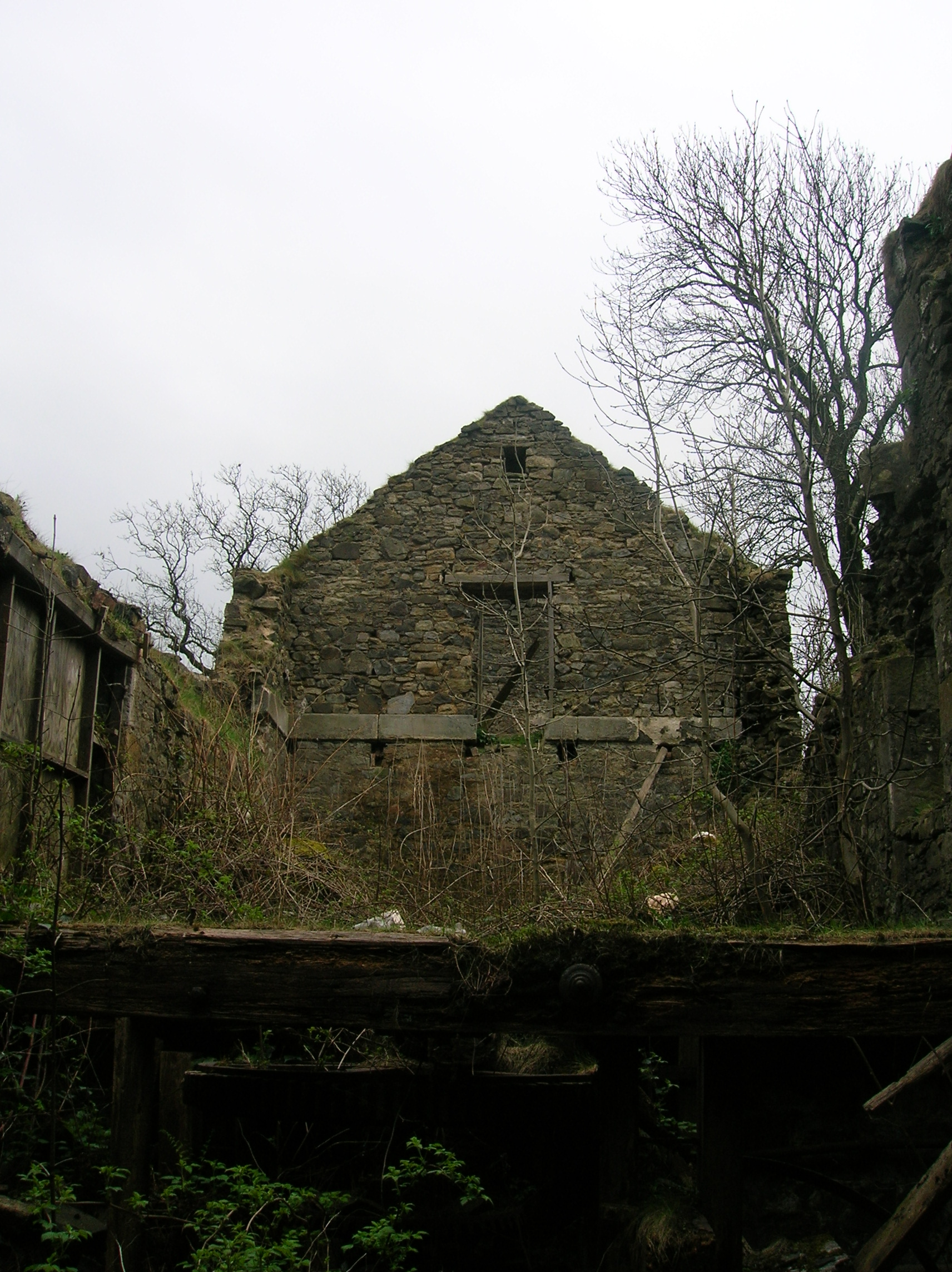
Inside the mill looking towards Greenhill

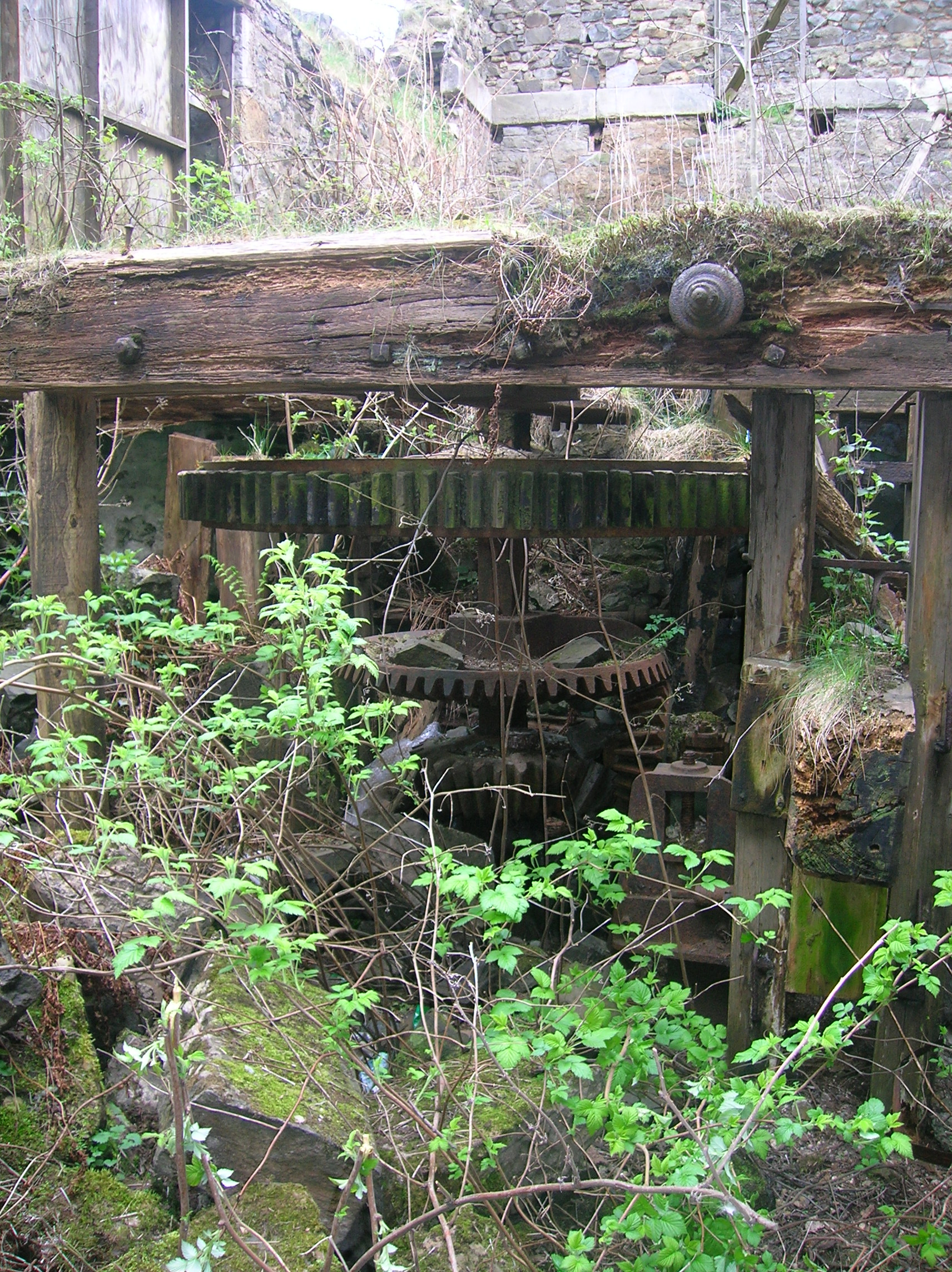
The main mill machinery

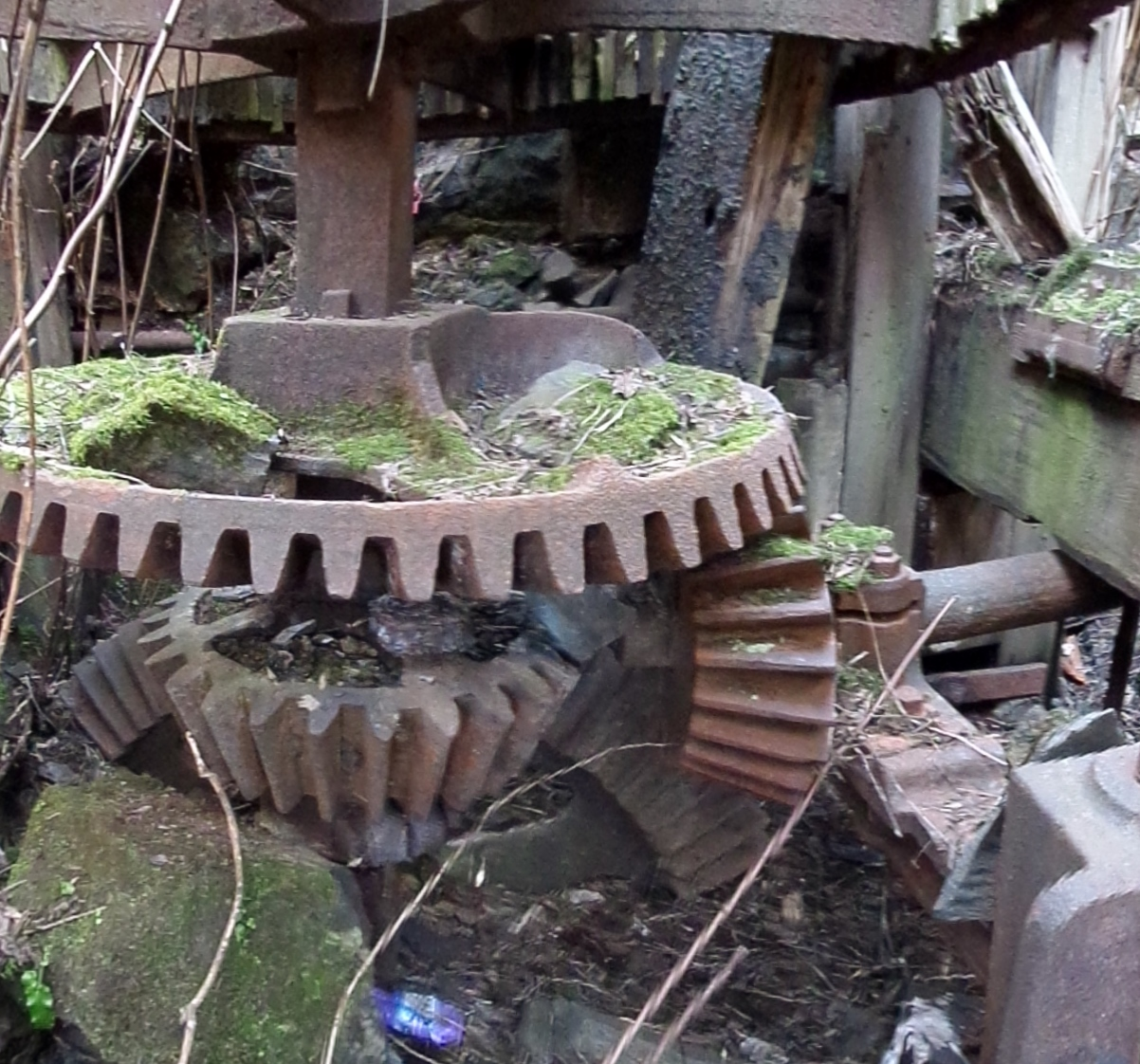
The adaptations to drive the saw mill.

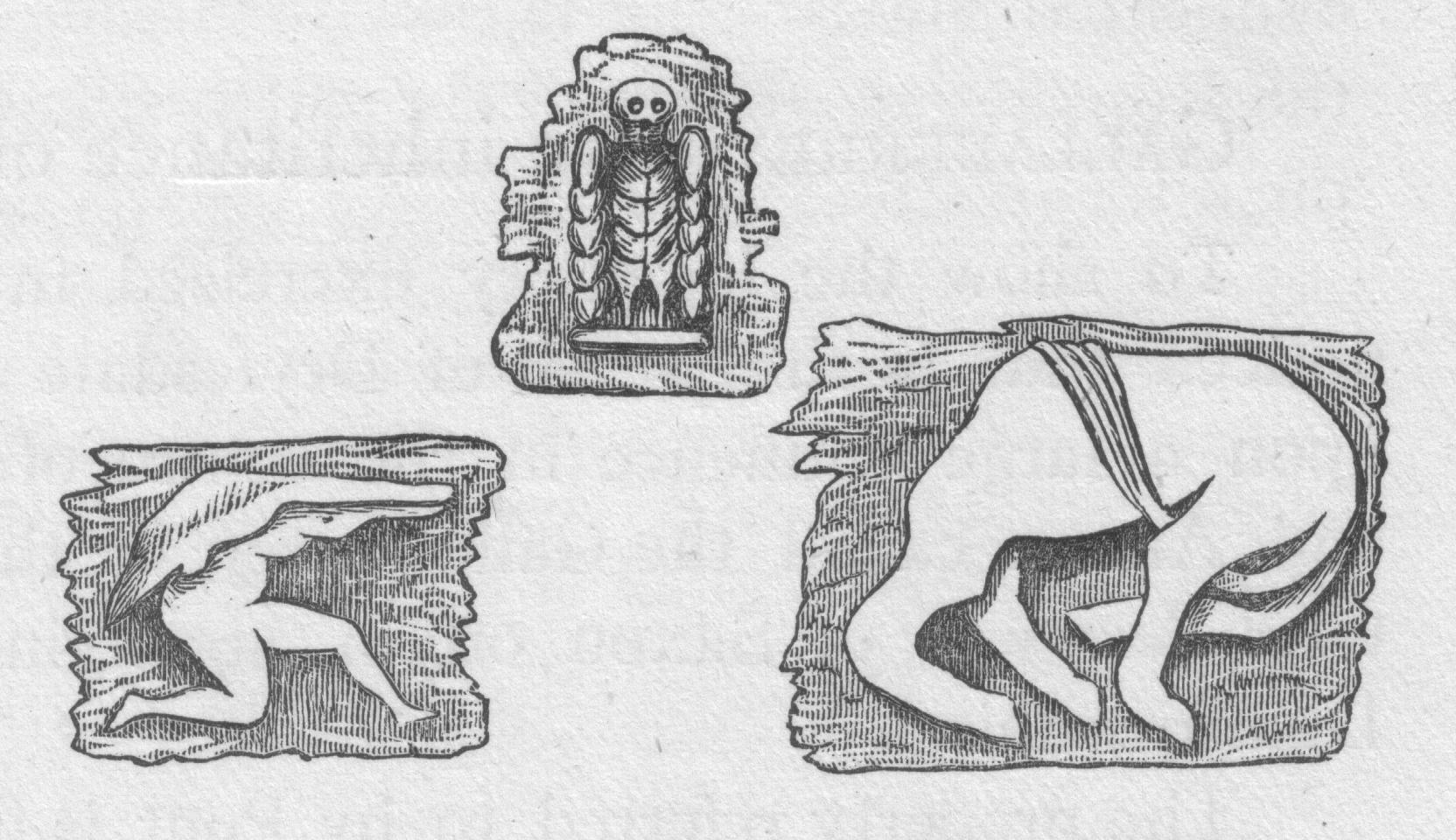
Carvings once located at the mill from the old castle
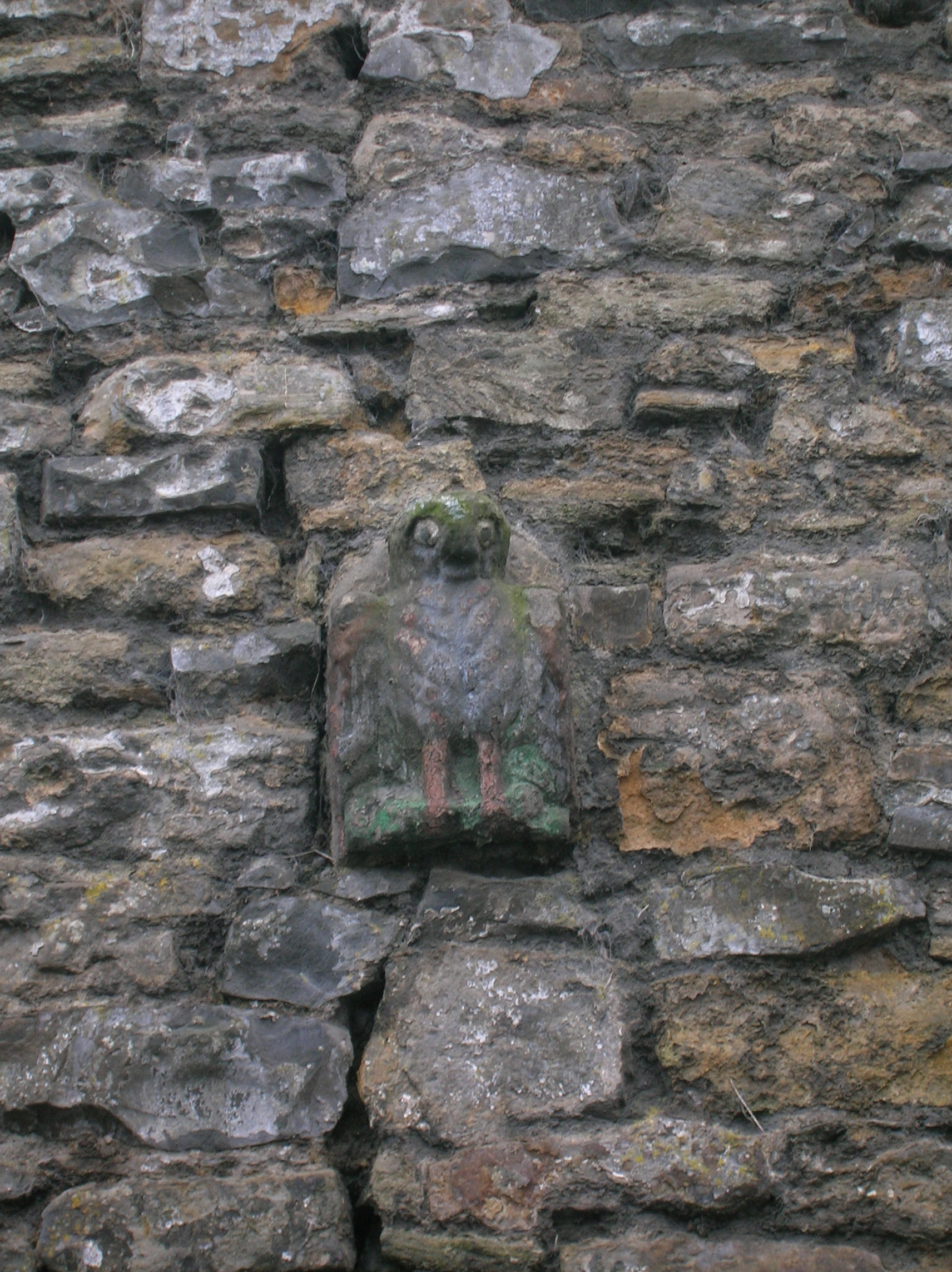
The 'Eagle' from Giffen Castle, now in the lower gable wall of Giffen mill

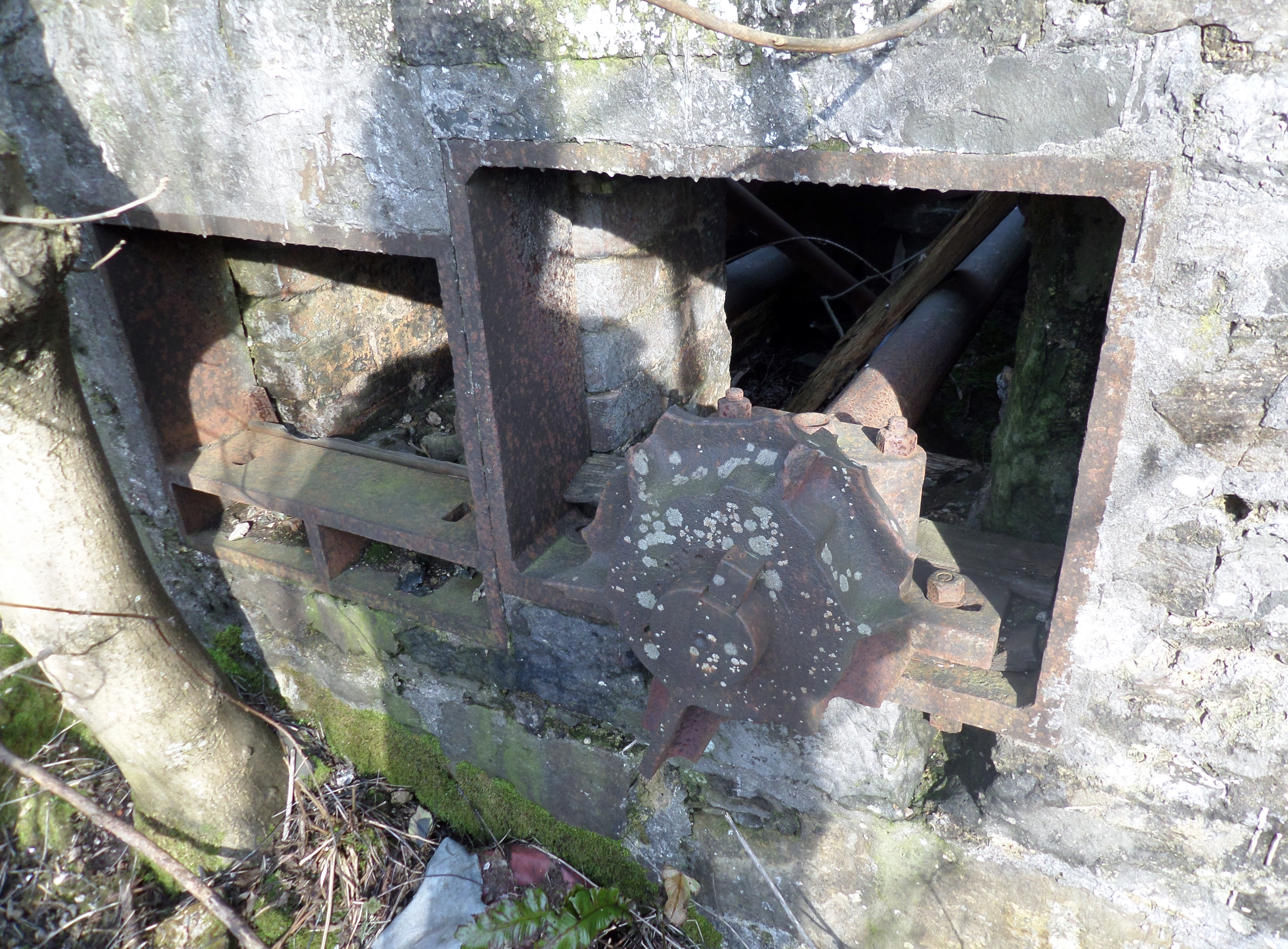
The external saw mill machinery remnants.

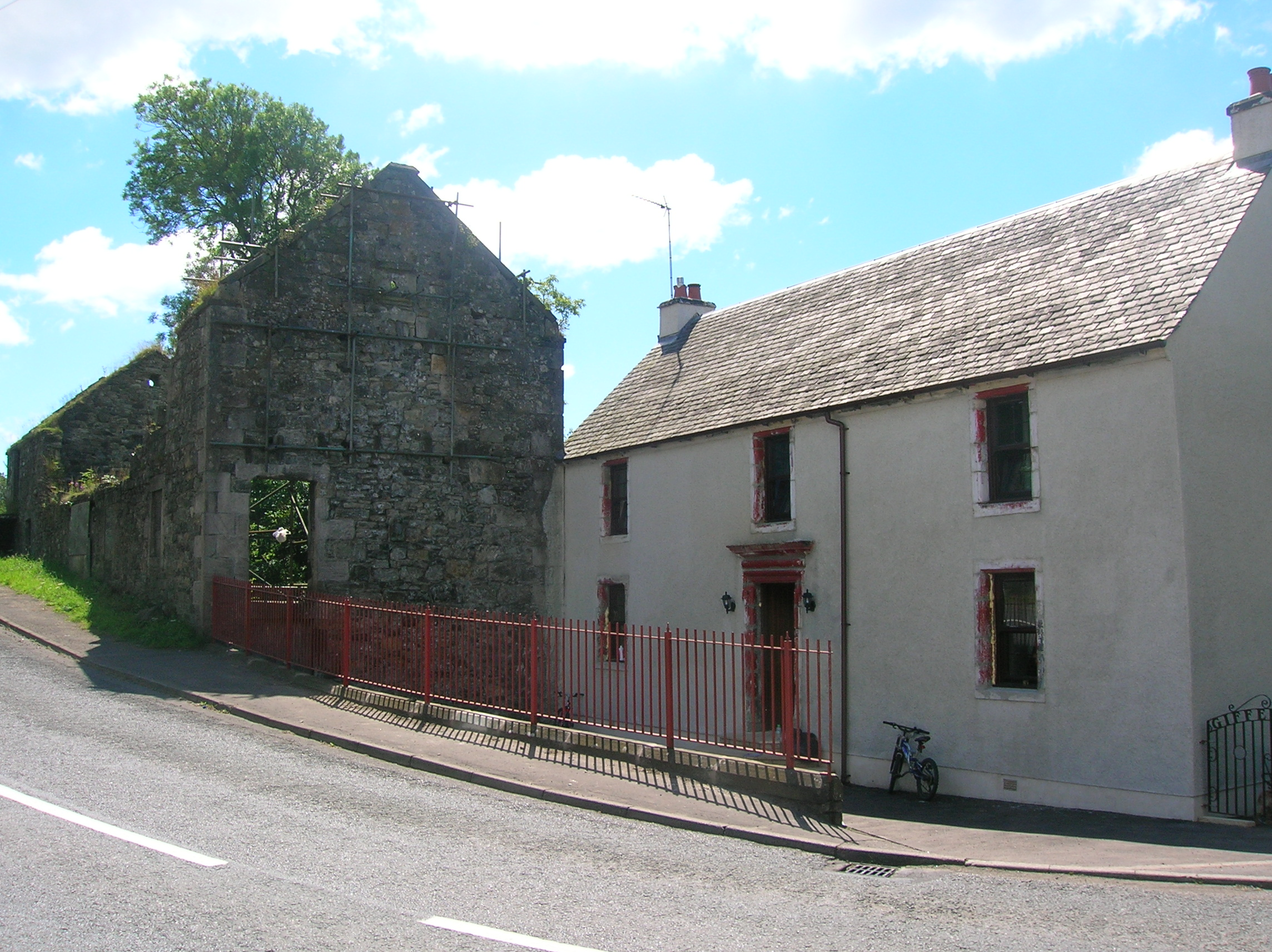
Giffen mill and Miller's house. The doorway is said to have come from the old castle.

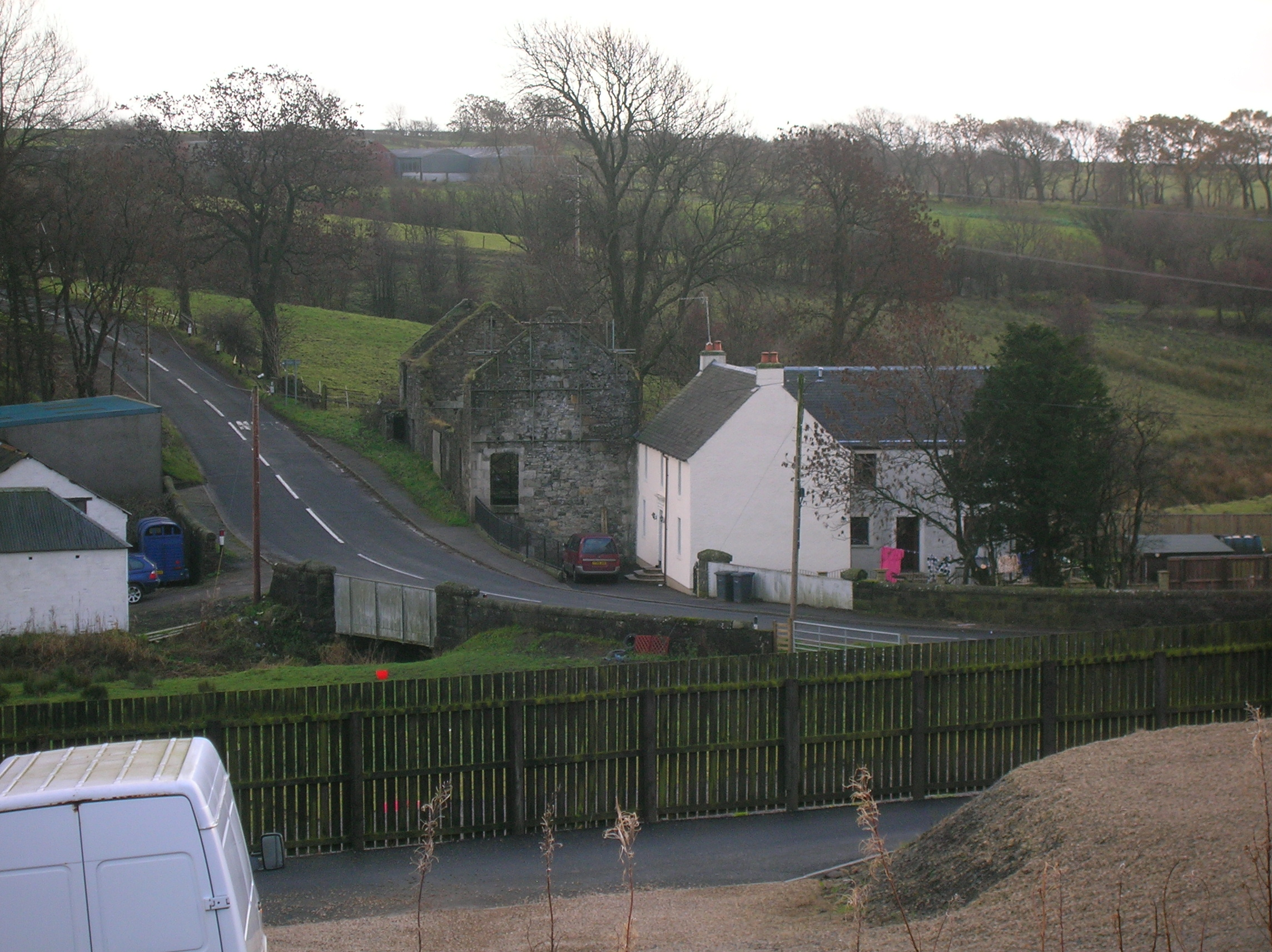
Giffen Mill and the old Miller's house from the village of Barrmill

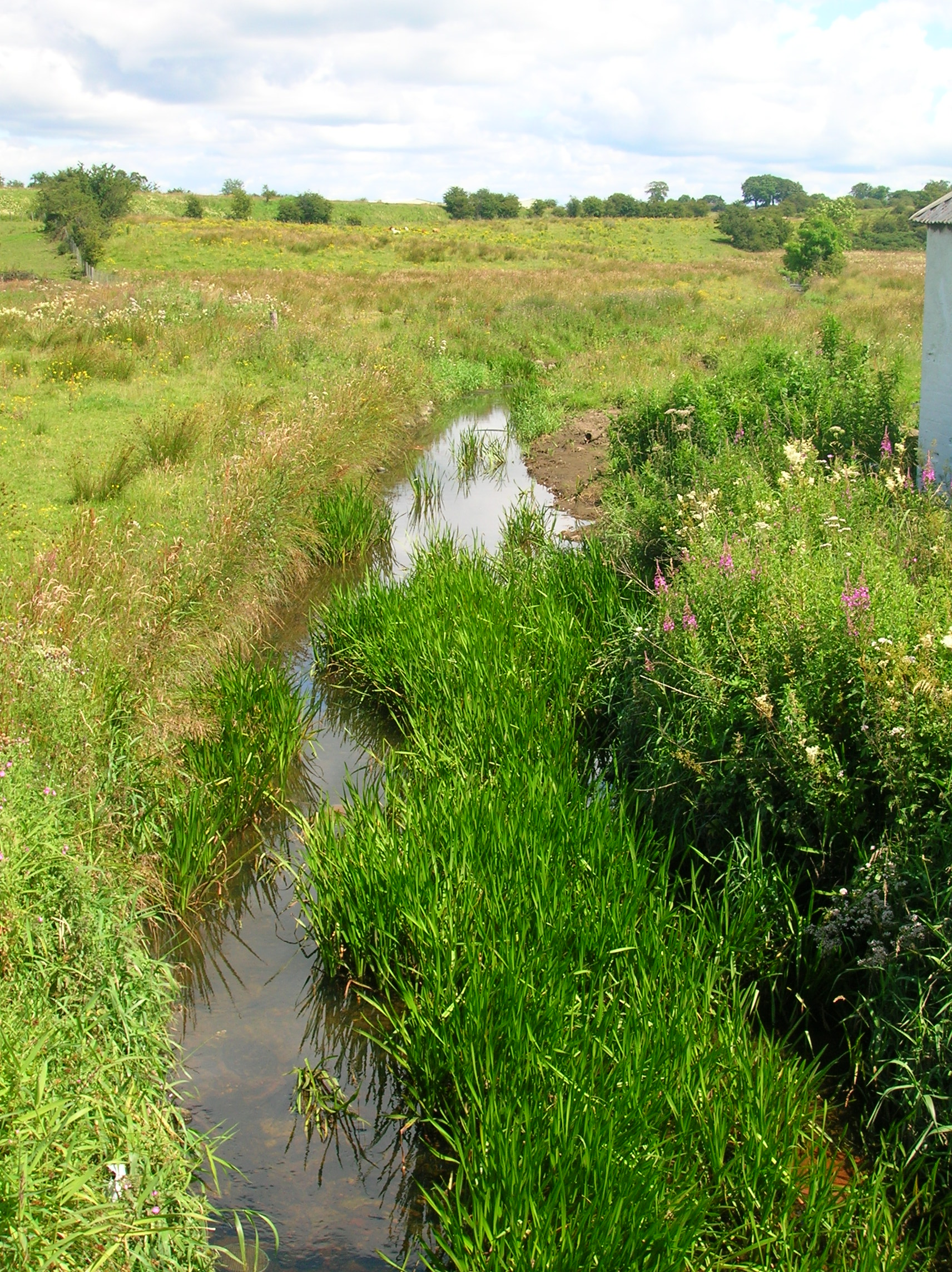
The Dusk Water which powered Giffen Mill

== Greenhills hamlet ==
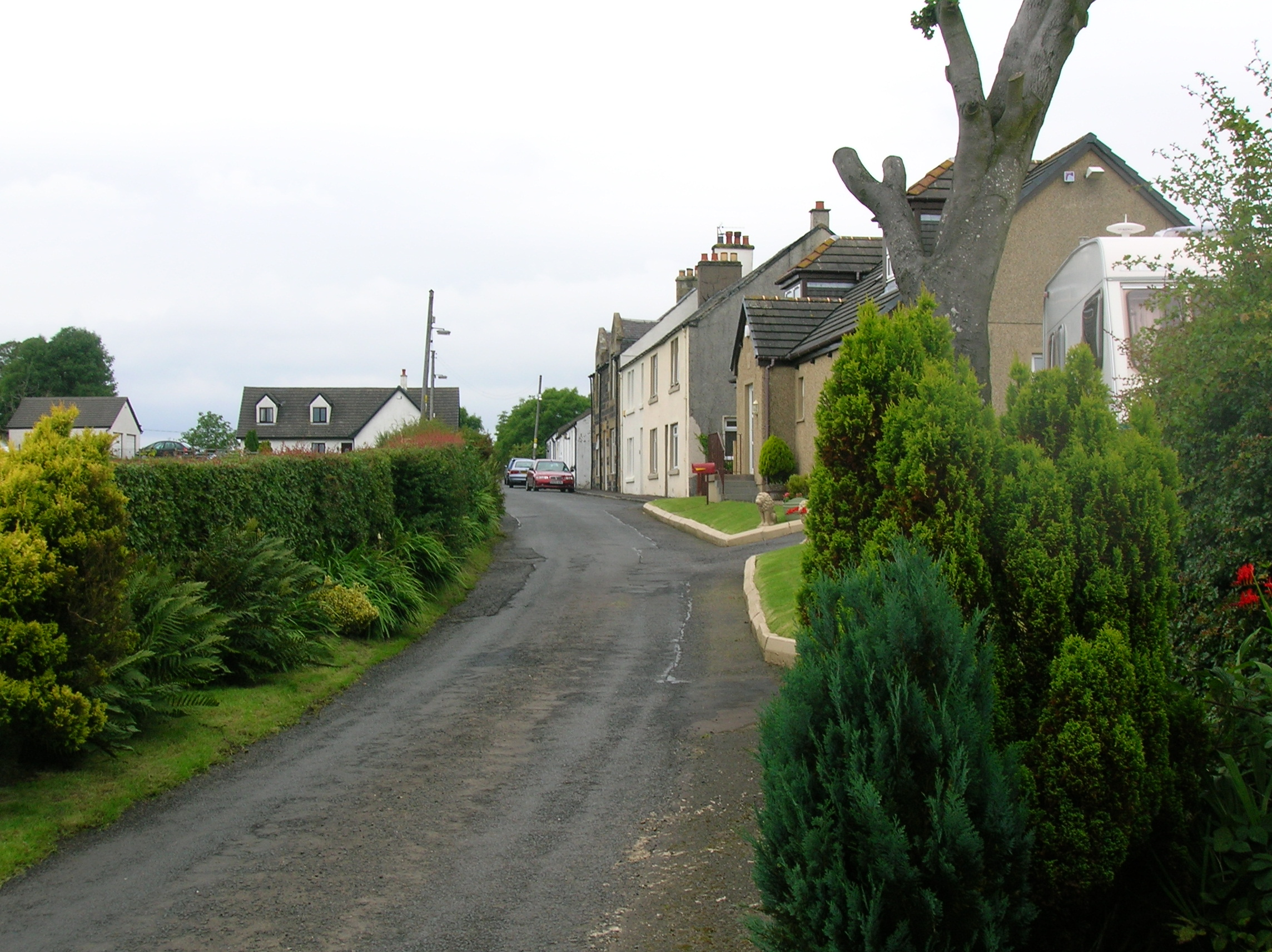
Greenhills main street

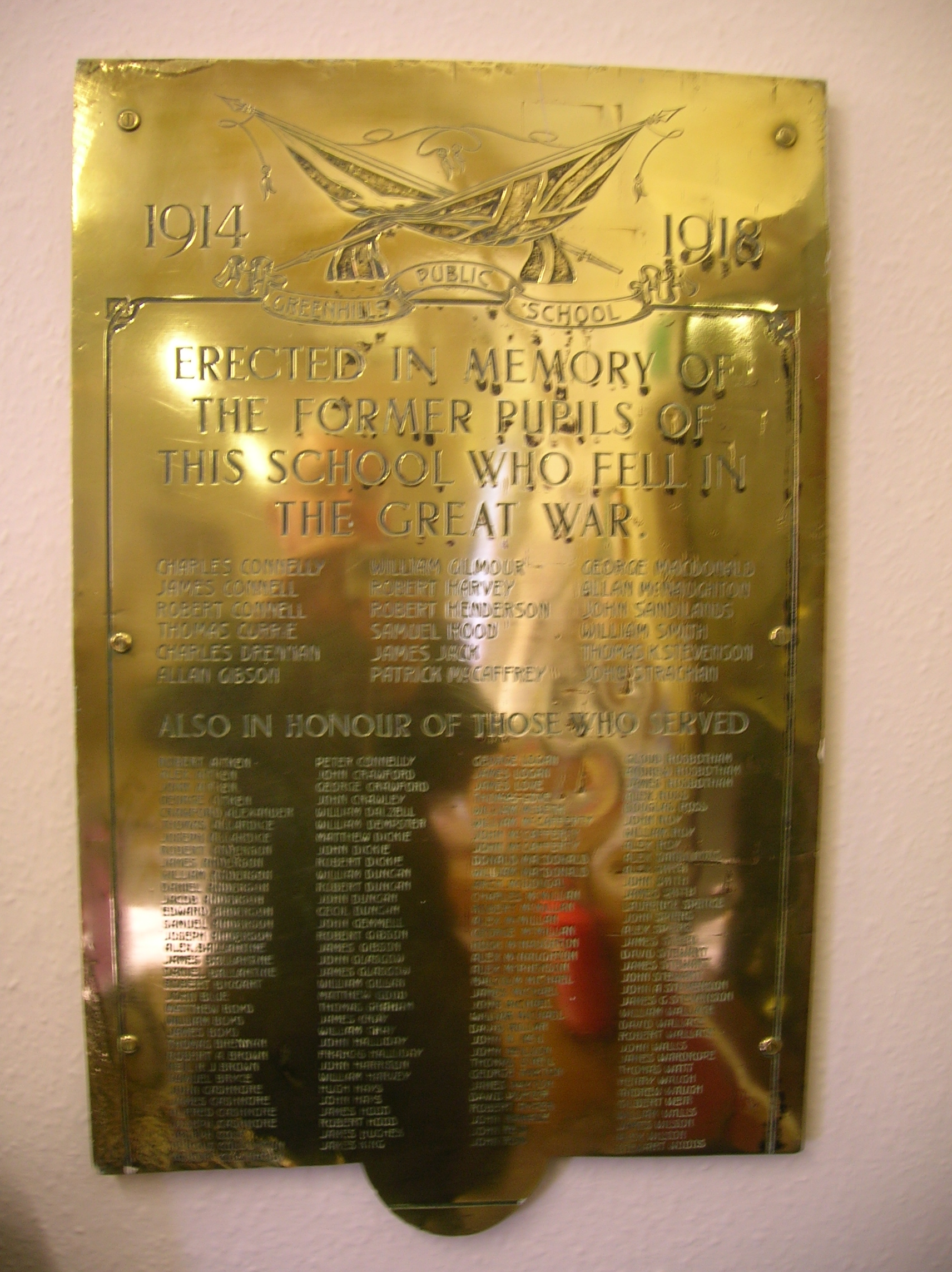
Greenhills Public School WW1 Memorial

This small settlement is shown on General Roy's survey of 1747 - 55, under the name of 'Greenhill' in the singular and has two buildings indicated where the old school was situated. The school opened in the 1890s at the time that Hessilhead school closed. Greenhills closed circa 1958 and was demolished in the mid-1980s; having been used for some years as a glue factory by Strathbond Ltd who still trade from the Willowyard Estate, Beith. Mr McGregor was the last headteacher and the sports field had been the field lying across the Barrmill to Burnhouse Road. A smithy stood at the crossroads on the Borestone farm side of the hamlet. This hamlet is named after the artificial mound, a Moot, Law or Justice hill that once stood here.

=== The Moot or Justice hill ===
This artificial mound or moot hill was the site where proclamations of the Giffen Castle Baronial Court's judgements were made. For serious crimes the men were hung here and women were drowned a pit which would have been nearby. This situation, known as the feudal Barony right of 'pit and gallows' existed at many other sites, such as at Beith, Kilmarnock, Aiket, Ardrossan, and Dalry. Often the mounds were wooded and a Dule Tree may have been used as the gallows. Brehons or Judges administered justice from 'Court Hills', especially in the highlands. Auchenmade had a Law hill mound nearby, possibly destroyed by the railway. The 'Green hill' stood near to Greenhill farm. No sign of the moot hill seems to survive, however a bridge near to Greenhill is marked as 'Tappethillock', meaning a flat-topped hillock, which may refer to it.

=== Borestone farm and the Bore stane ===
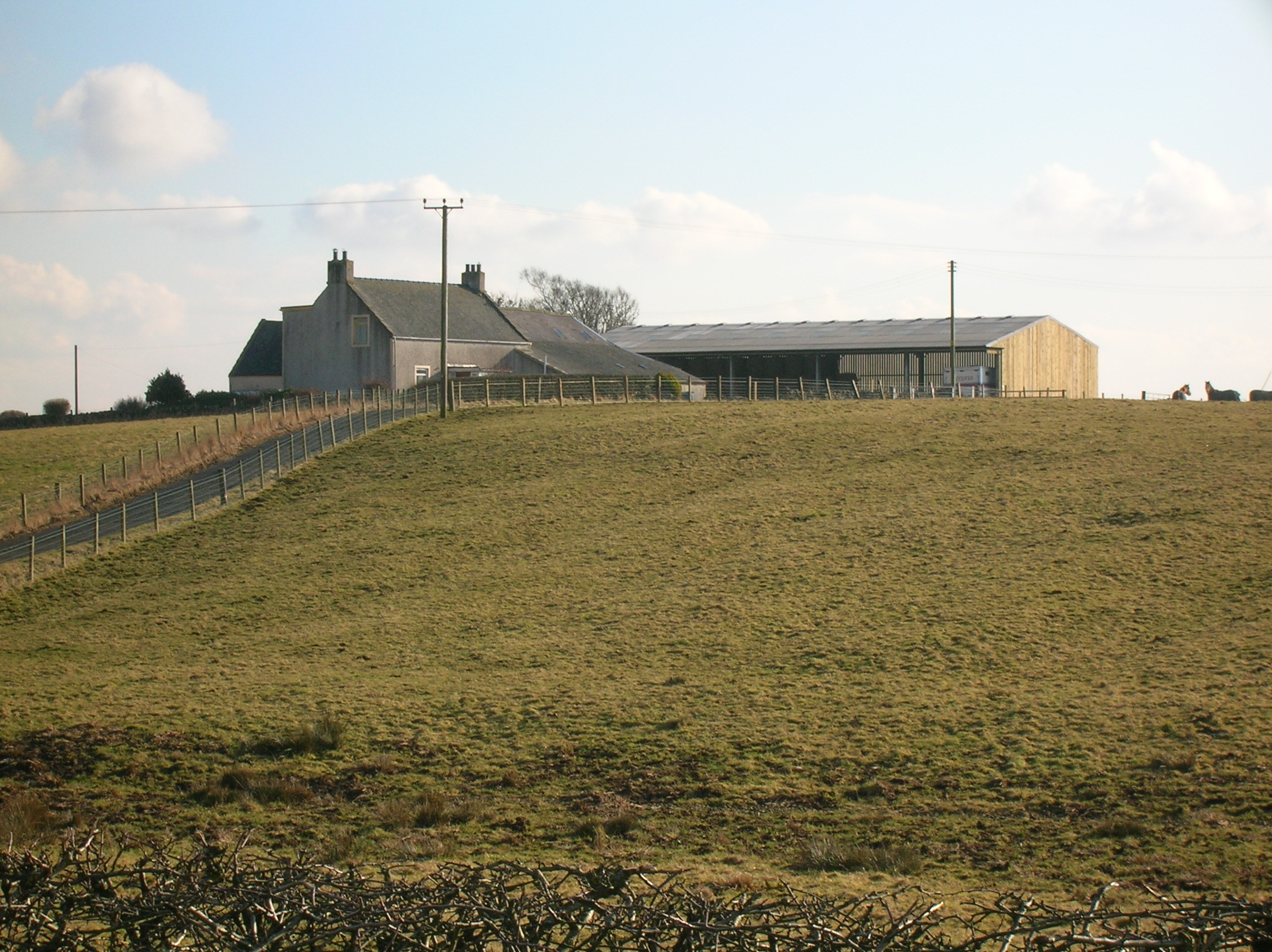
Borestone Farm from Greenhills lane

In 1876 Dobie recorded that the Bore Stone or Stane was a large sandstone about 11 1/2 inches in diameter, situated on the farm of Borestone to which it gave name (Name Book 1856). It had a circular opening in which it is said the flagstaff of the lordship or barony used to be erected when vassals from the neighbourhood were summoned to battle; at this position it would have been visible to all parts of the barony and beyond. but it is more likely to be a natural cavity caused by weathering. The farmer, Mr Craig, was not sure in 1895 if the stone was genuine, we will never know as the Bore Stone was broken up in about 1950 according to Mrs Raeside of Borestone Farm. It was at map reference: NS 3742 5054. During World War II the borestone was used by troops who were training in the area.

=== Thirdpart and the Hessilhead feud ===
Thirdpart was an 8s. land, part of the Giffen Barony and in 1663 feued to John Wilson by the Earl of Eglinton. It remained in that family until at least 1876. James Wilson of Thirdpart was a notable local eccentric who wrote and published poems on such topics as the 'Trearne Cattle Shows', the 'Fall of Giffin Castle' and the 'Misfortunes of a clocking-hen'. James died in 1838. William Wilson who lived here in 1837 was a brick and tile maker. A small mansion had been present here, occupied in the 1570s by John Montgomerie of Scotstoun, a near relative of the Laird of Hessilhead.

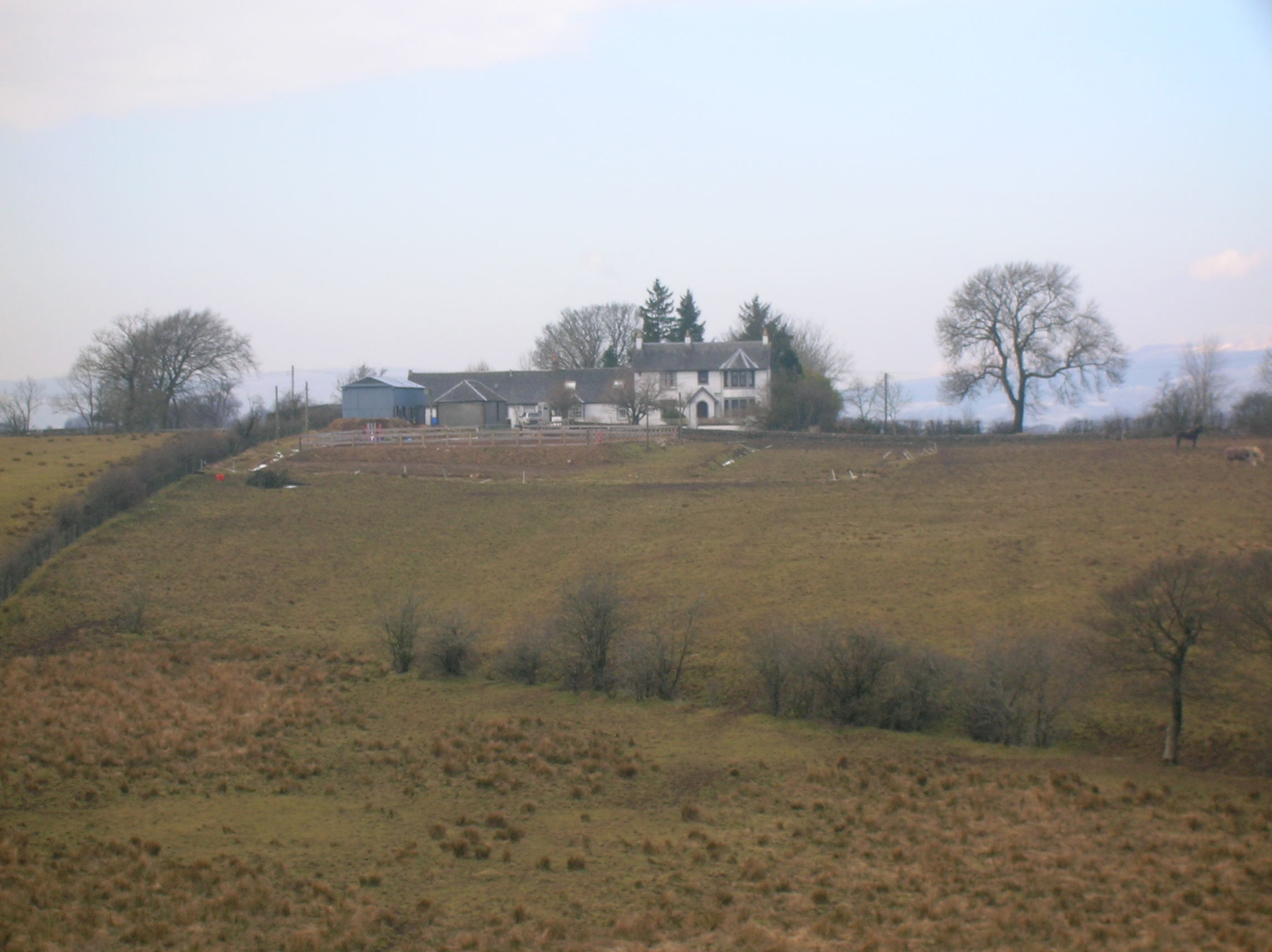
Thirdpart Farm from Bank of Giffen

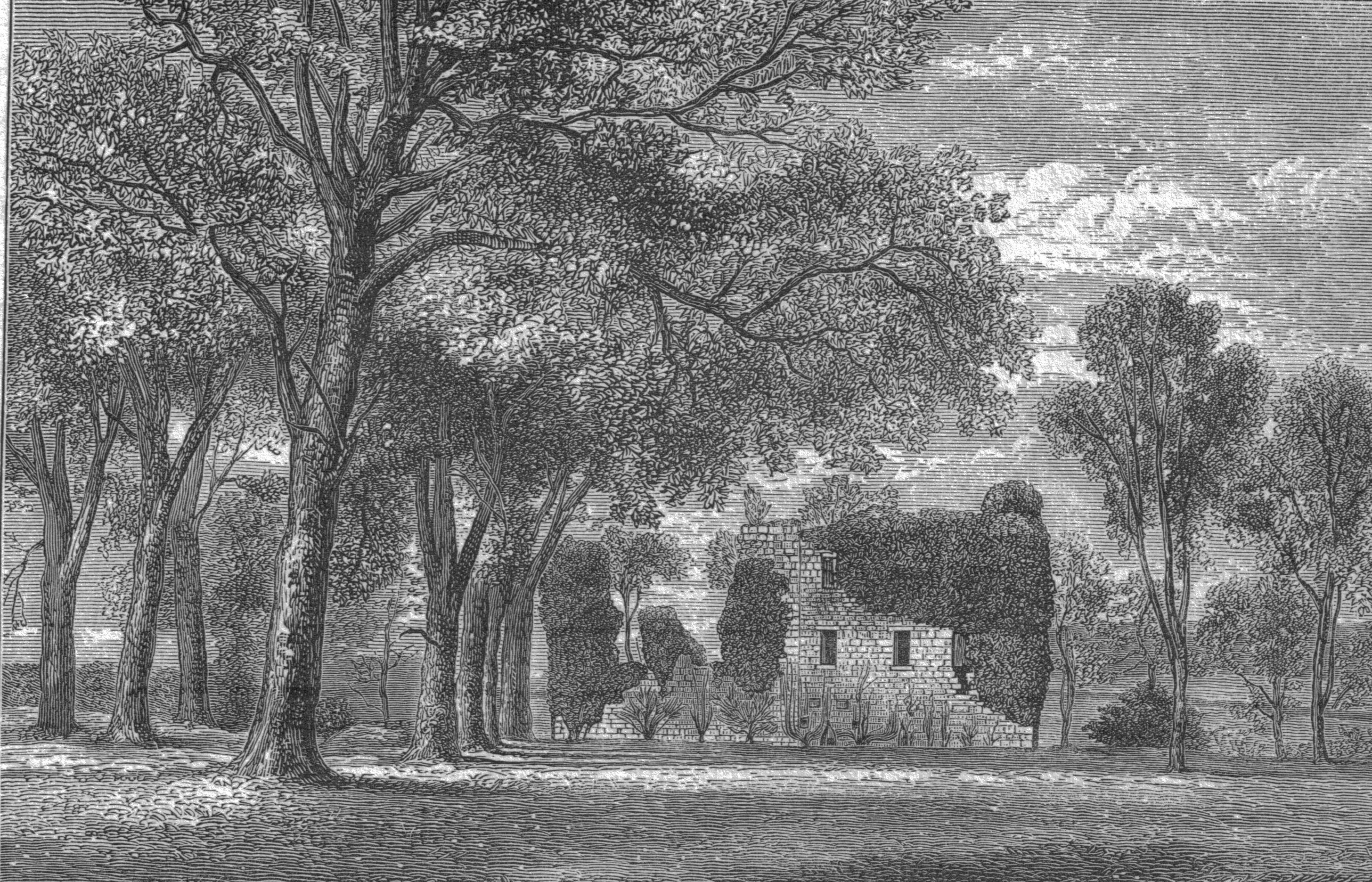
Hessilhead (Hasil head) castle in 1876

A dreadful series of incidents occurred in the locality, starting on 19 July 1576 when the Lady of Hessilhead slapped one Robert Kent, servant to Gabriel, brother of John Montgomerie, for some grave offence given. The servant complained to his master and Gabriel went to his brother at the old Thirdpart mansion for advice. John advised him to seek revenge and therefore the next morning Gabriel and Robert gained entry into Hessilhead castle where they found the lady alone, upon which they grabbed her by the hair, pulled her onto the floor, kicked her in the bowels, and bruised her shamefully. Gabriel intended to shoot the Laird, however the whole household was now awake and the two only just managed to escape by stealing a horse and locking the castle gate from the outside. The Laird, Hew Montgomerie, hastened to Thirdpart where John and Gabriel came out with pistols and drawn swords and attacked Hew Montgomerie, injuring him on various parts of his body and leaving him for dead. He was rescued by some neighbours who took him to Hessilhead castle where he recovered from his wounds. Soon afterwards Hessilhead men, including one named Giffen, killed Gabriel after setting up an ambush for him. On 26 August John, Kent and another brother, Walter, went to try to kill the Laird, but could not find him. Amazingly the results of the various court cases was that no one was found guilty of any of the offences, most likely because honour had been satisfied on both sides.

Hessilhead was the home of Alexander Montgomerie (1545–1611), master poet and songster in the court of King James VI. He is best remembered for his poem, The Cherrie and the slae.

=== Bank of Giffen ===
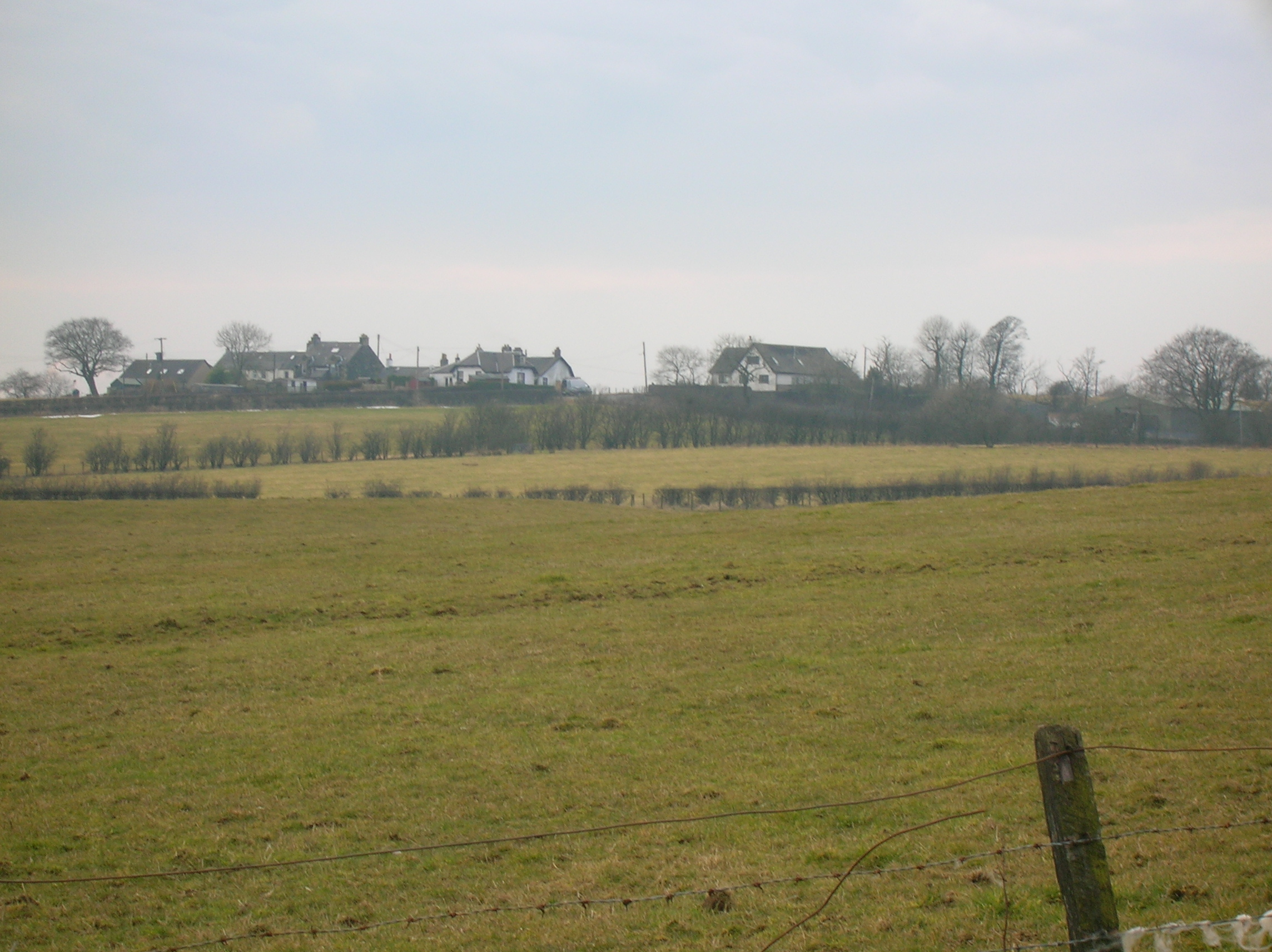
Greenhills from Bank of Giffen

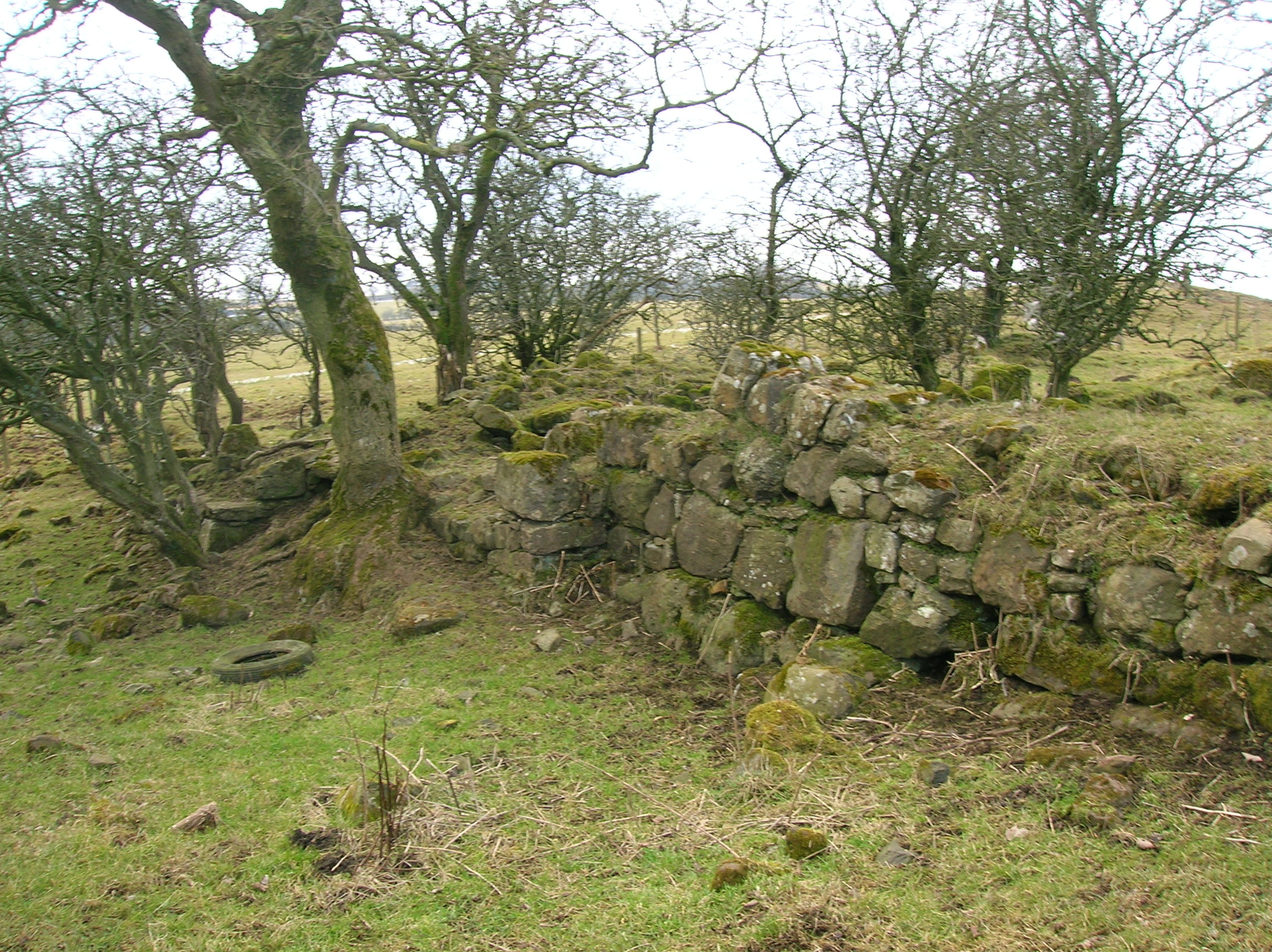
Bank of Giffen Farm ruins

In 1858 a farm known as 'Bank of Giffen' stood below the whinstone ridge which is close to what is now the old railway line across the road from Thirdpart farm; it is shown as abandoned in 1911. General Roy's map of 1747 - 55 marks its as 'Bank' only. Some ruins of the farm are still visible today (2007). A Ley tunnel is said to run from Bank of Giffen to Giffen Castle; some years back a couple of children are said to have found he tunnel and safely made their way through.

== Nettlehirst House and estate ==
Nettlehirst was a fine mansion, also known as 'Nettlehurst', a castle-like structure overlooking the old Giffen Station and Dusk Water on the high ground above the limekilns. The Burns family built Nettlehirst House in 1844. William Burns became a toy-maker. In July 1932 the house burned down, possibly due to an electrical fire. The dramatic fire coincided with the return from South Beach by a special train of Barrmill Sunday School trip on the line from Ardrossan to Giffen Station. The fierce fire was clearly visible from the train and it was a talking point in the village for months.

The mansion house was never restored and shortly afterwards the dangerous ruin was demolished. The unusual entrance gatepiers, apple and pear orchard, boundary walls, mausoleum, farm and the stables, with its crow stepped gable ends and an 1811 marriage stone remain. The platform of the old tennis court is still apparent.

The OS Map shows a family burial ground located near woodland to the south of the old house site. The fine red sandstone structure still survives (2010) although the crypt has been broken into and the frontage stones are much disturbed. No inscriptions are apparent on the structure.

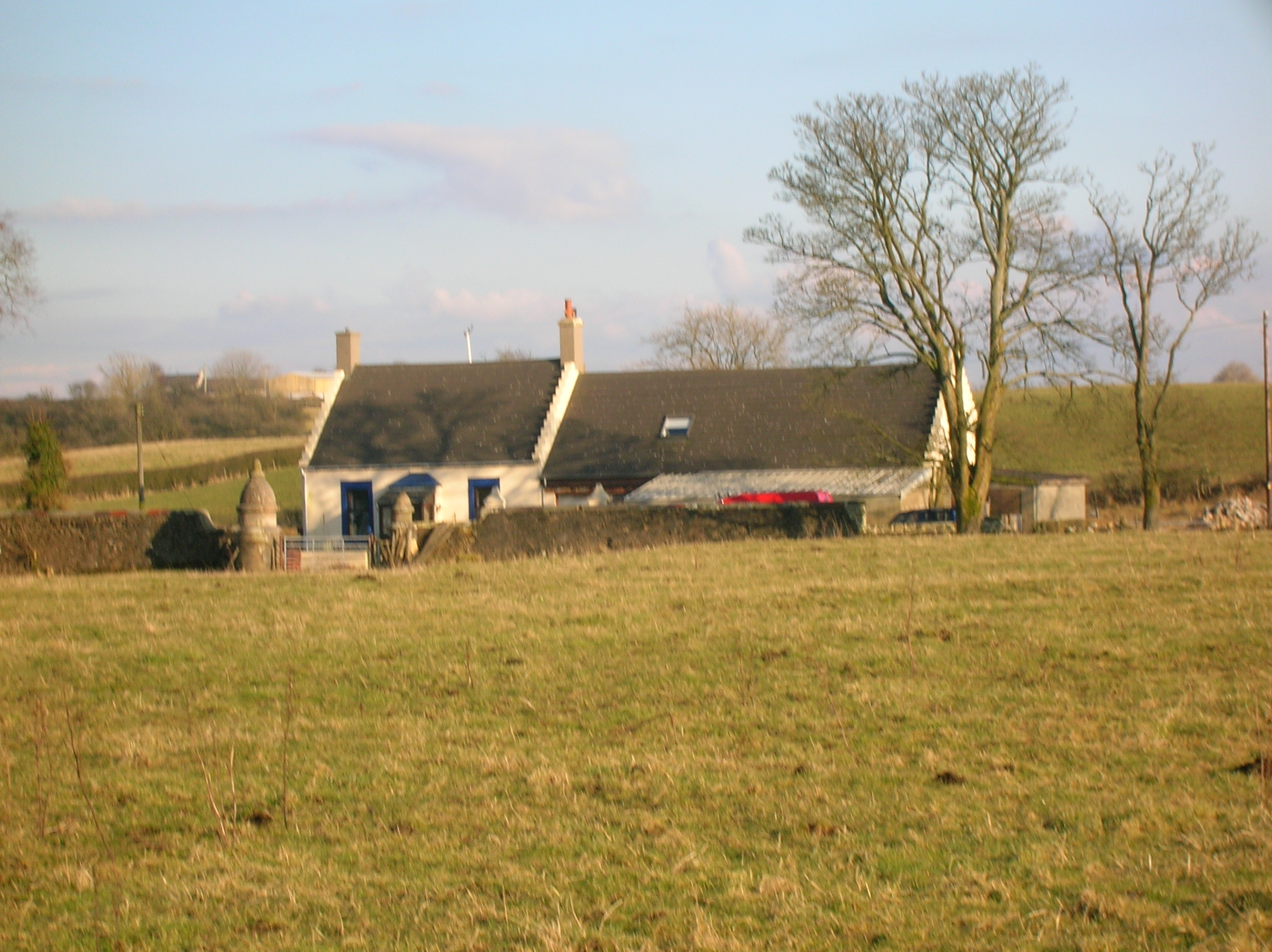
Nettlehirst's old groom's cottage and stables.

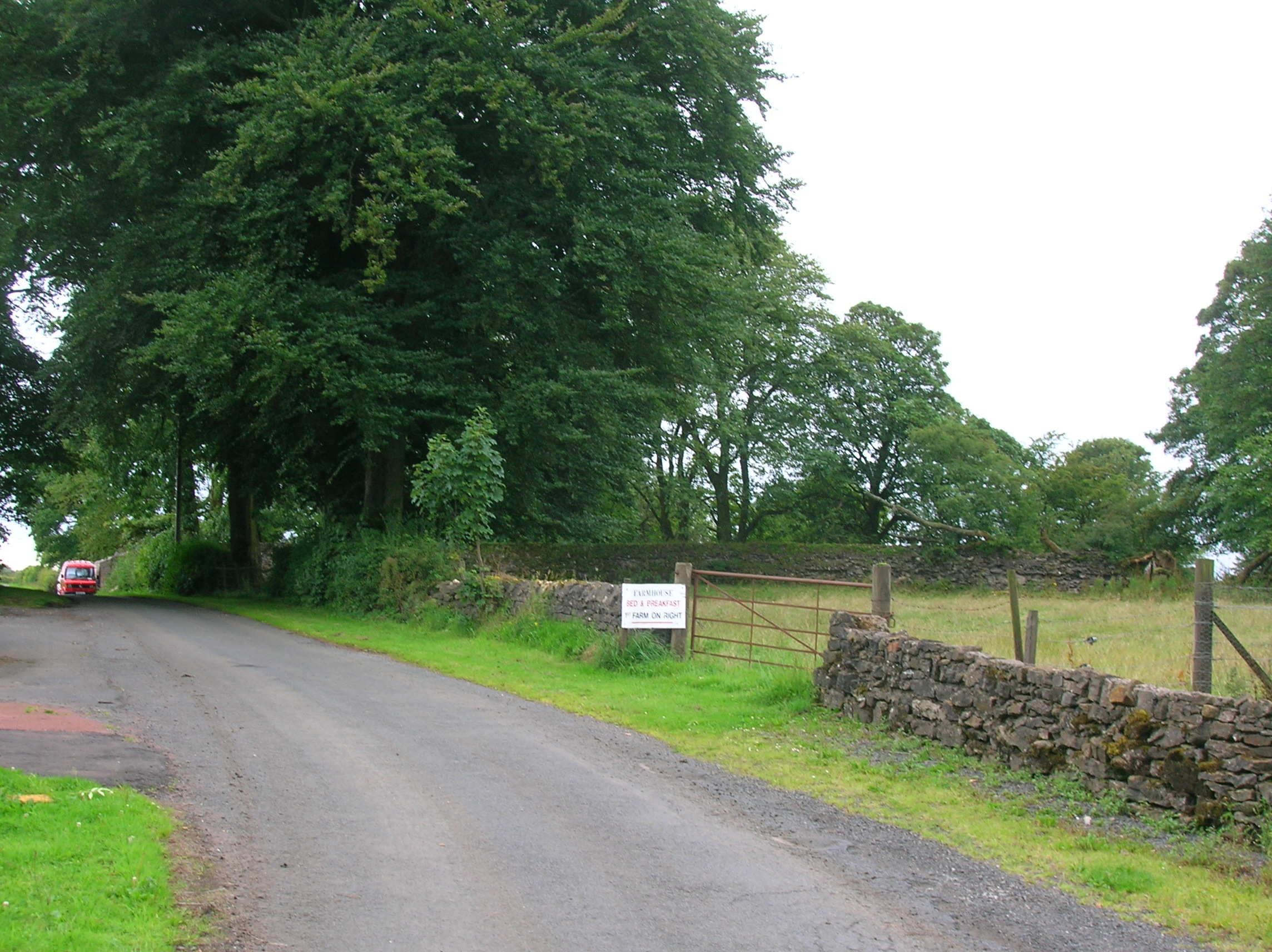
Nettlehirst old estate wall and trees.

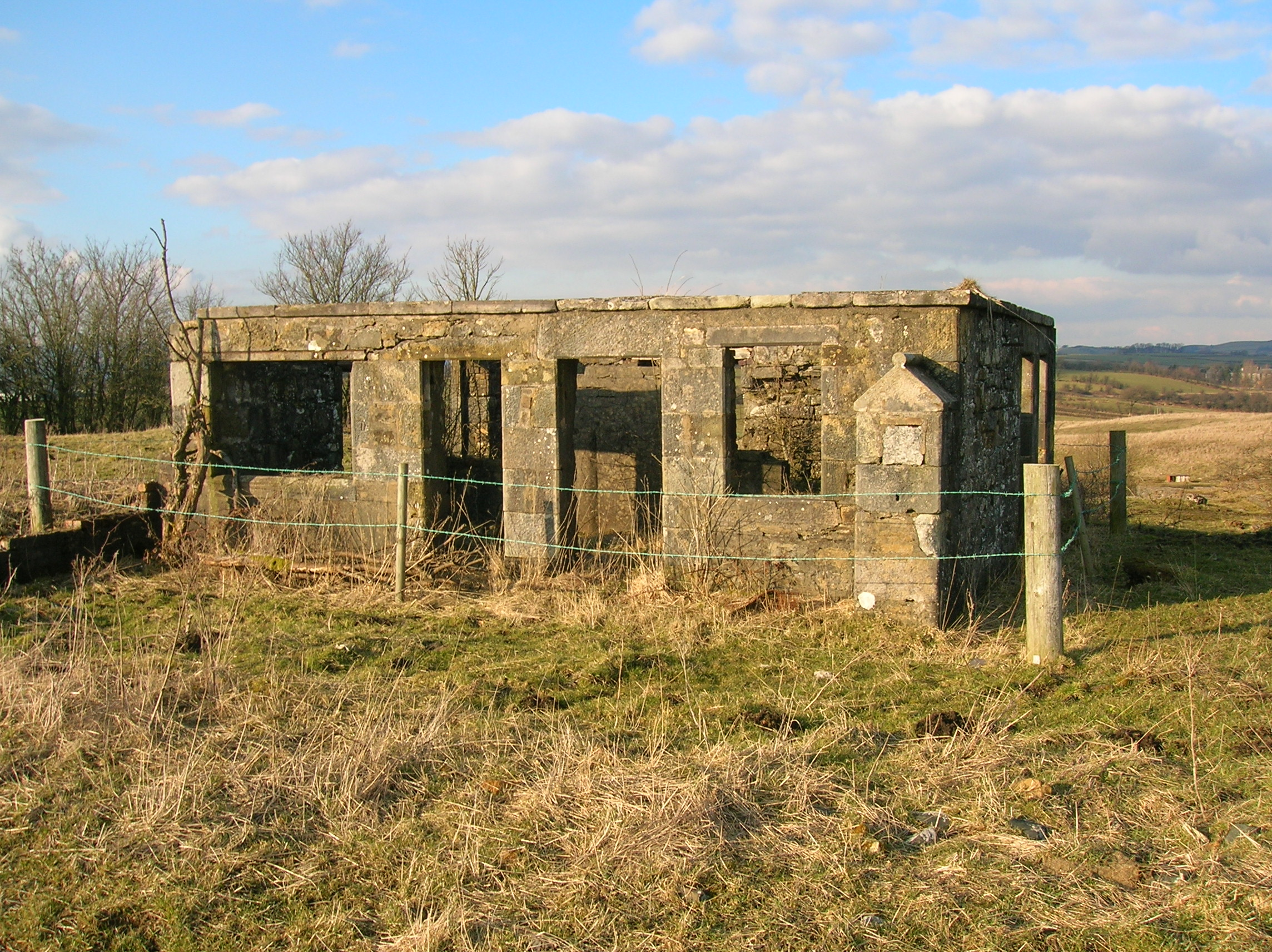
A ruin within the Nettlehirst grounds bearing an 1811 marriage stone.

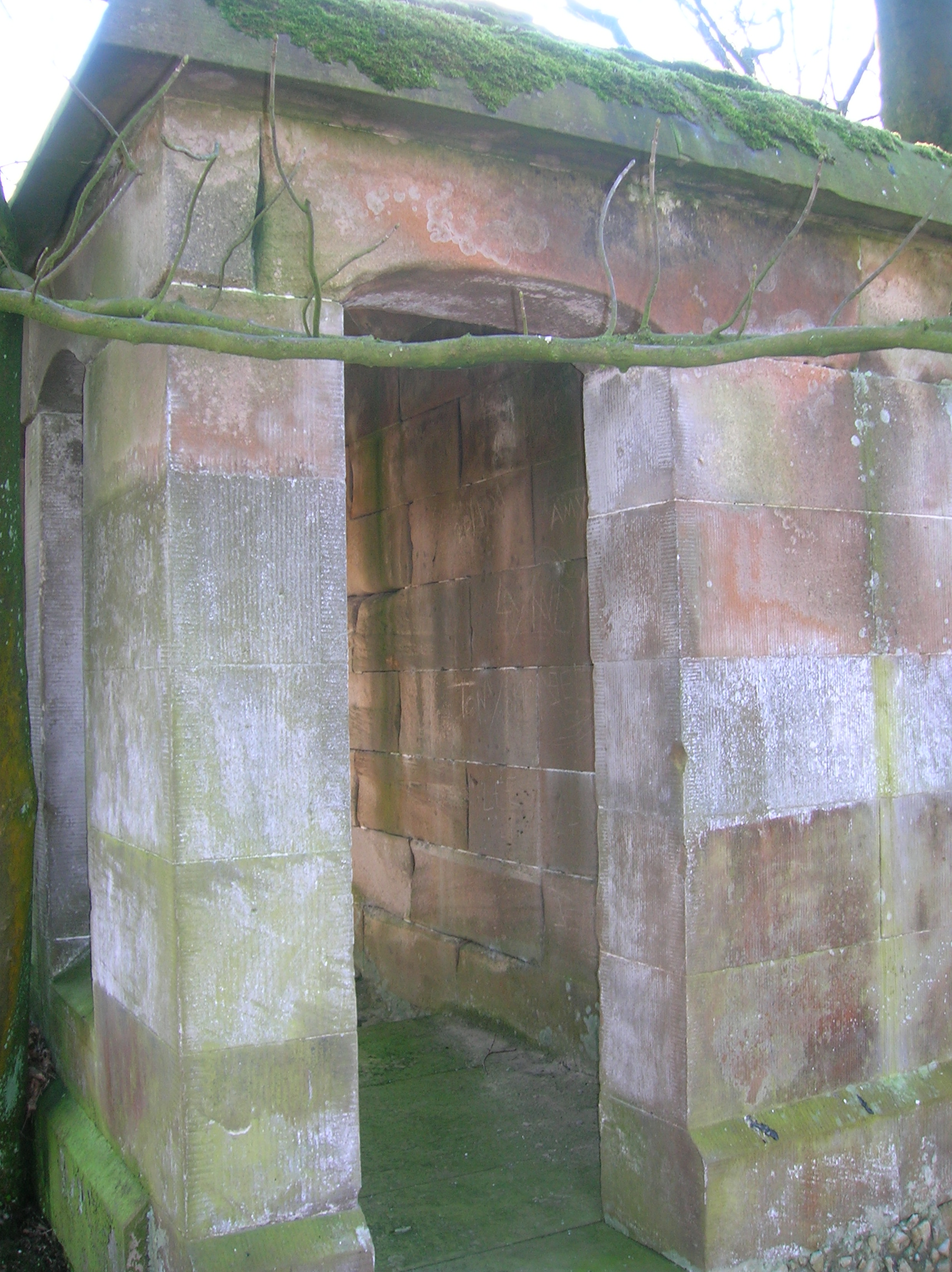
A side entrance

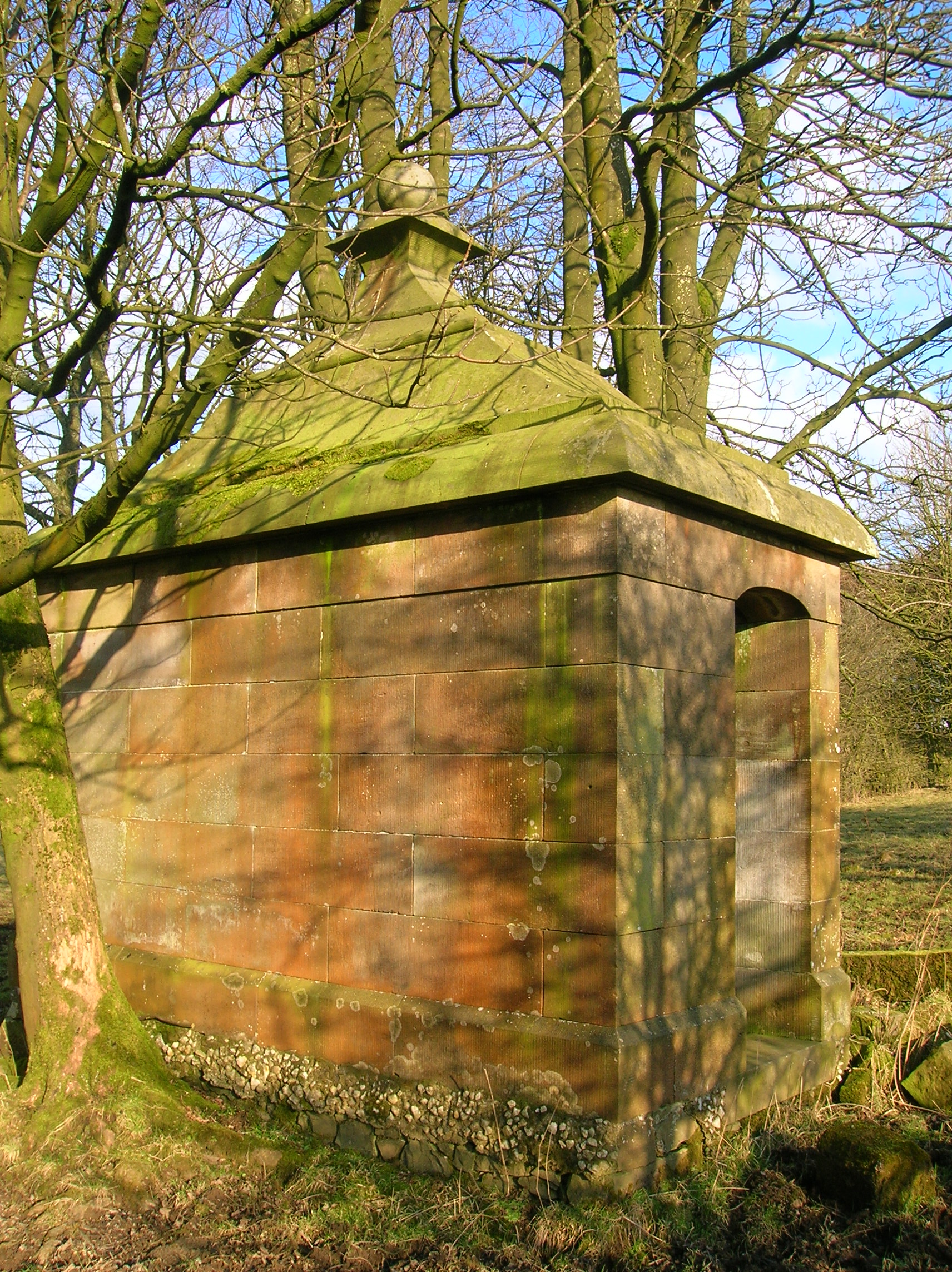
The back of the mausoleum

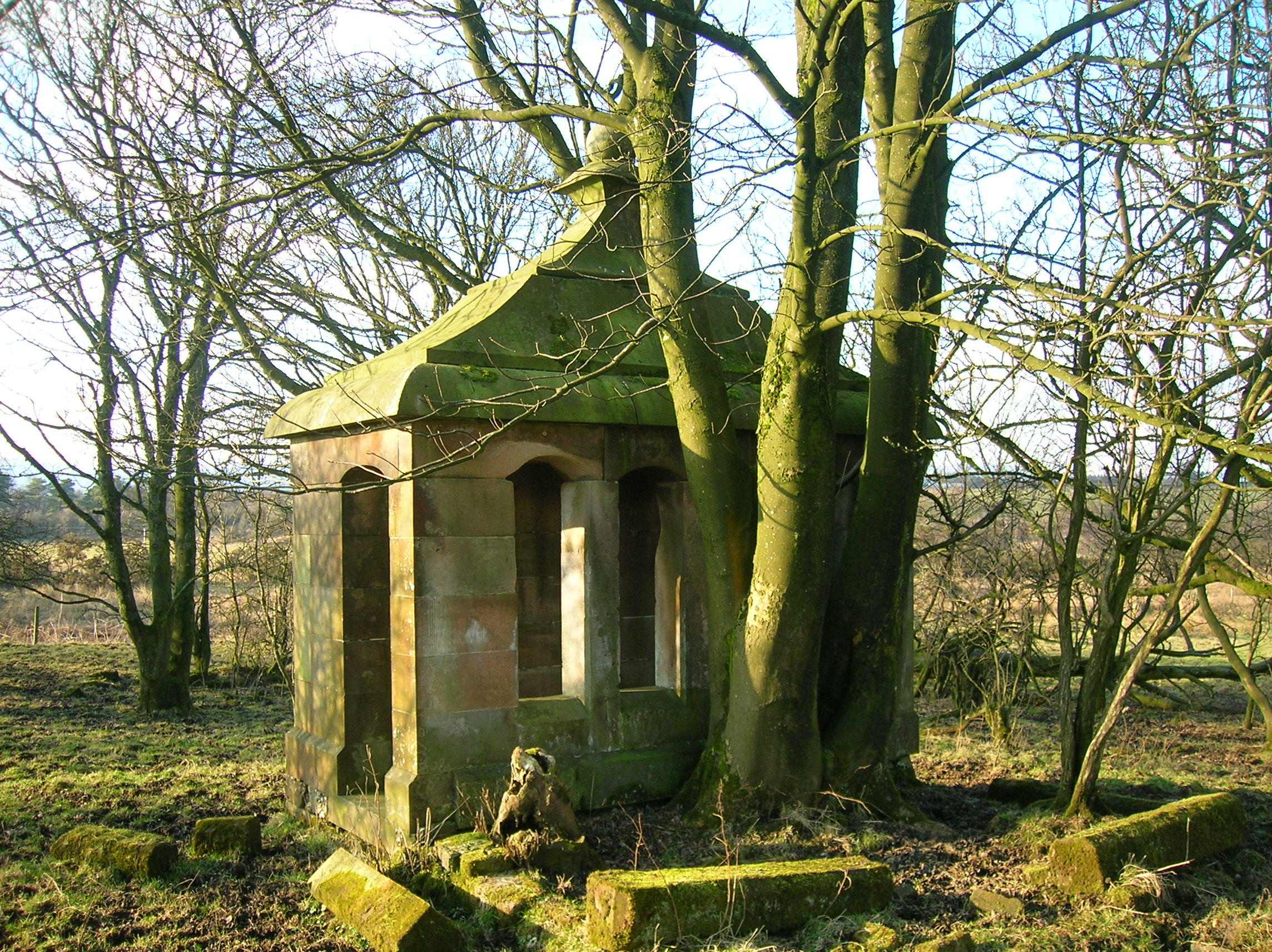
The frontage

A confusing number of properties in the area are known as Nettlehirst, some distinctions being made by adding 'cottage' or the owners name, such as Reid Nettlehirst. The origin of the placename itself is unknown, however the 'Nettle' may refer to the plant and 'Hurst' may refer to harvest; meaning an area where nettles predominate. The term 'hairst' might refer to a barren hillock, knoll, or ridge. A fitting description of the site today.

== Barrmill ==
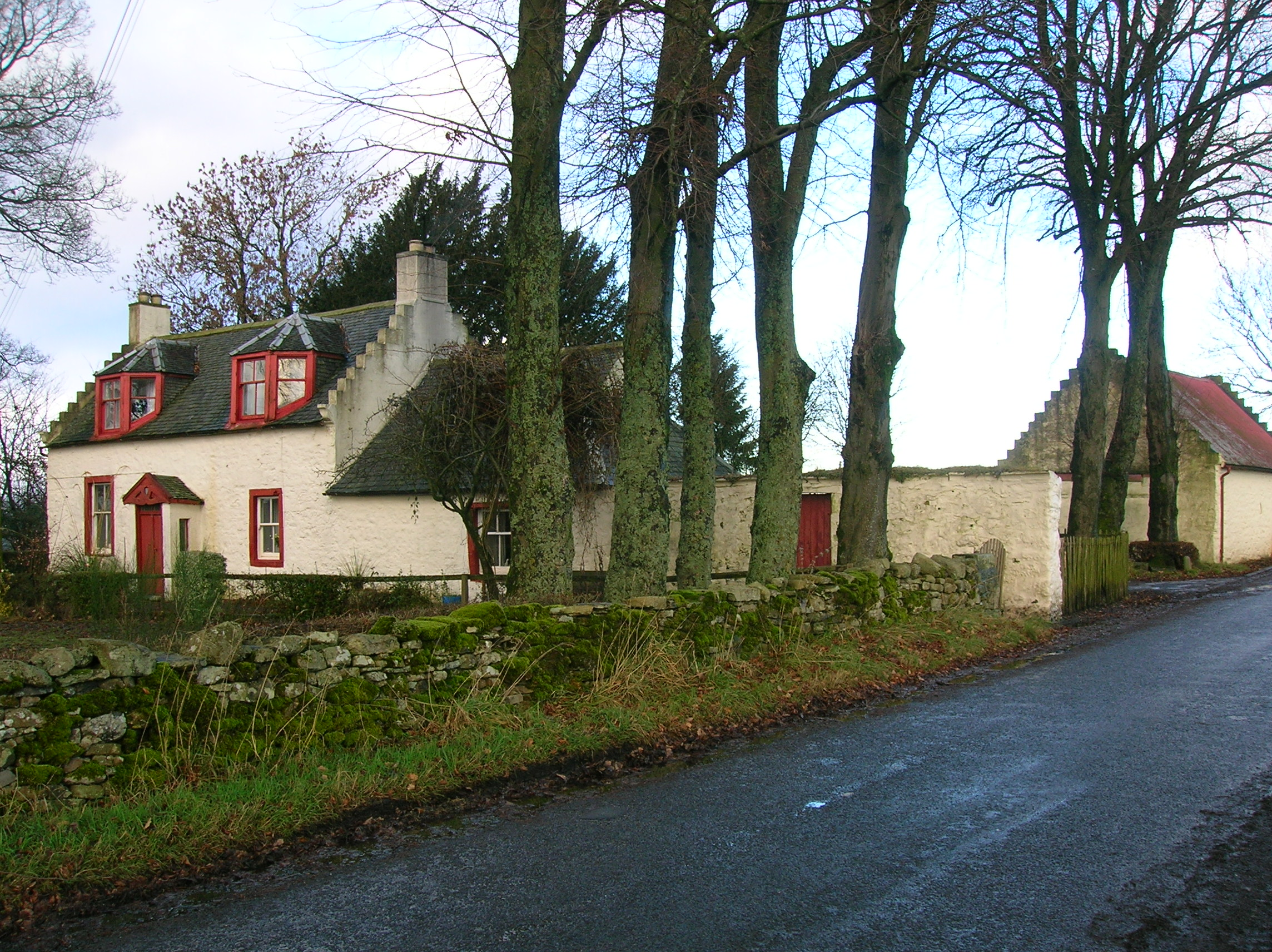
Drumbuie House, a property in the Barony of Giffen

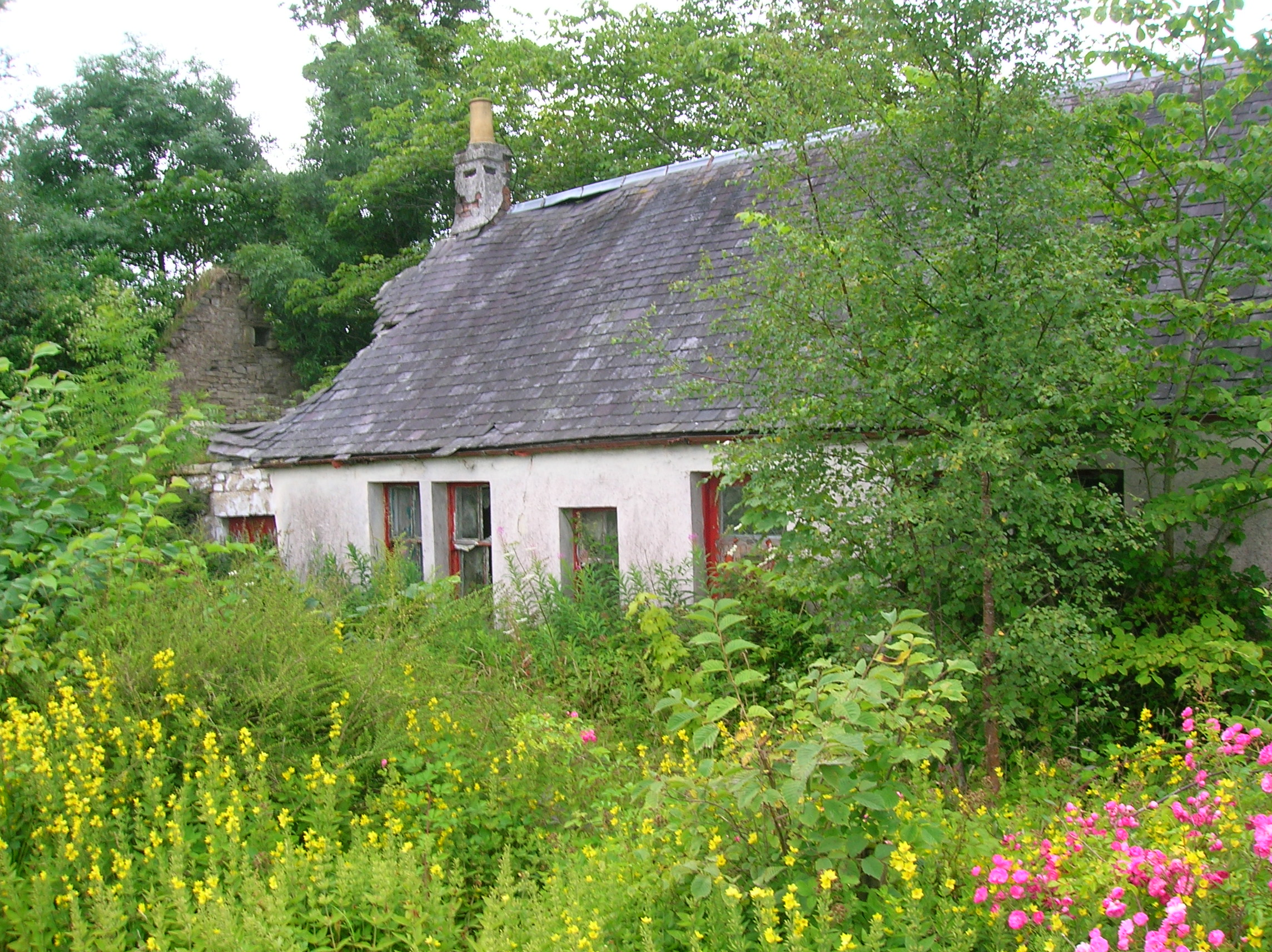
Nettlehirst Farm in 2009

General Roy's survey of 1747 - 55 shows only the farm of High Barr. A village grew up here due to the employment provided by the several limestone quarries that were present at one time, the Dockra Ironstone pit that was located near the railway line down from Dockra quarry in 1912, and other local industries.

The village (co-ordinates 55 43' 45.2'' N | 04 36' 3.8'' W) that developed had a population of 300 in 1876 and 600 in 1951, when the threadmaking industry had just ceased, although the workers still lived in company houses and were transported daily to the threadmaking factory at Kilbirnie. The limestone works was still active, but it too closed in 1972. The whinstone quarries of Messrs. King & Co. employed a considerable number of men in 1951, but even then the quarries were almost worked out. Giffen coal pit (No 1) lay close to Bankhead Moss as shown on the 1897 OS map, closing not long afterwards as the following OS maps cease showing it. The 1912 OS map marks the quoiting ground which was in what is now the park, close to the old railway embankment; a mission hall is also shown, located just the other side of the railway bridge over the Beith branchline. In 2006 a new housing estate was created on the site of the old Barrmill railway station and goods yard.

=== The local railways ===
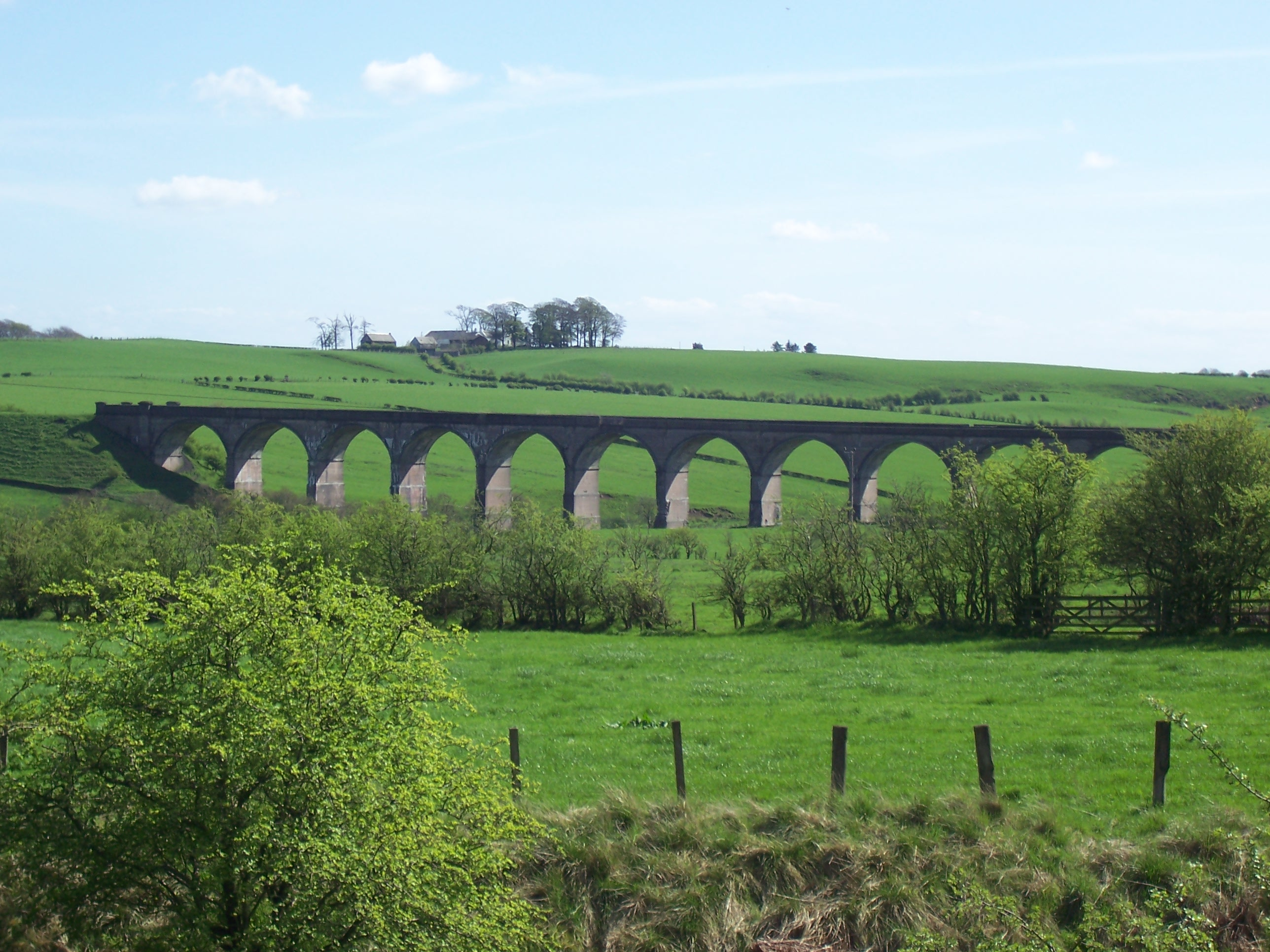
The Gree Viaduct in 2007, now demolished, on the former line between Lugton and Giffen

At NS 356 5111 was Giffenmill Viaduct, opened 1903 by the Lanarkshire and Ayrshire Railway. A 7-span viaduct, with semi-circular concrete arches, it became disused in 1950 and was demolished in 2006. It was also known as the Barr Mill or Dusk Water viaduct. The nearby Gree Viaduct stood until its demolition in early 2008. The local station opened on 3 September 1888 and was known as Kilbirnie Junction, however it was renamed Giffen on 1 October 1889. Giffen closed in 1932, but it had three platforms, a small station building, and at one point at least seven members of staff. The platforms still survive (2007), but the line running through the station serving DMC Beith is no longer in use (2007).

Barrmill railway station served the village of Barrmill and was originally part of the Glasgow, Barrhead and Kilmarnock Joint Railway branch from Lugton to Beith. It was the only intermediate station on the route, opening on 26 June 1873, and closing permanently to passengers on 5 November 1962. It was a single platformed station. Freight services continued on the line until 1964. On the 1897 OS map a tramway is shown running down to Barrmill station from quarries at Dockra.

Views of Giffen station (2008)

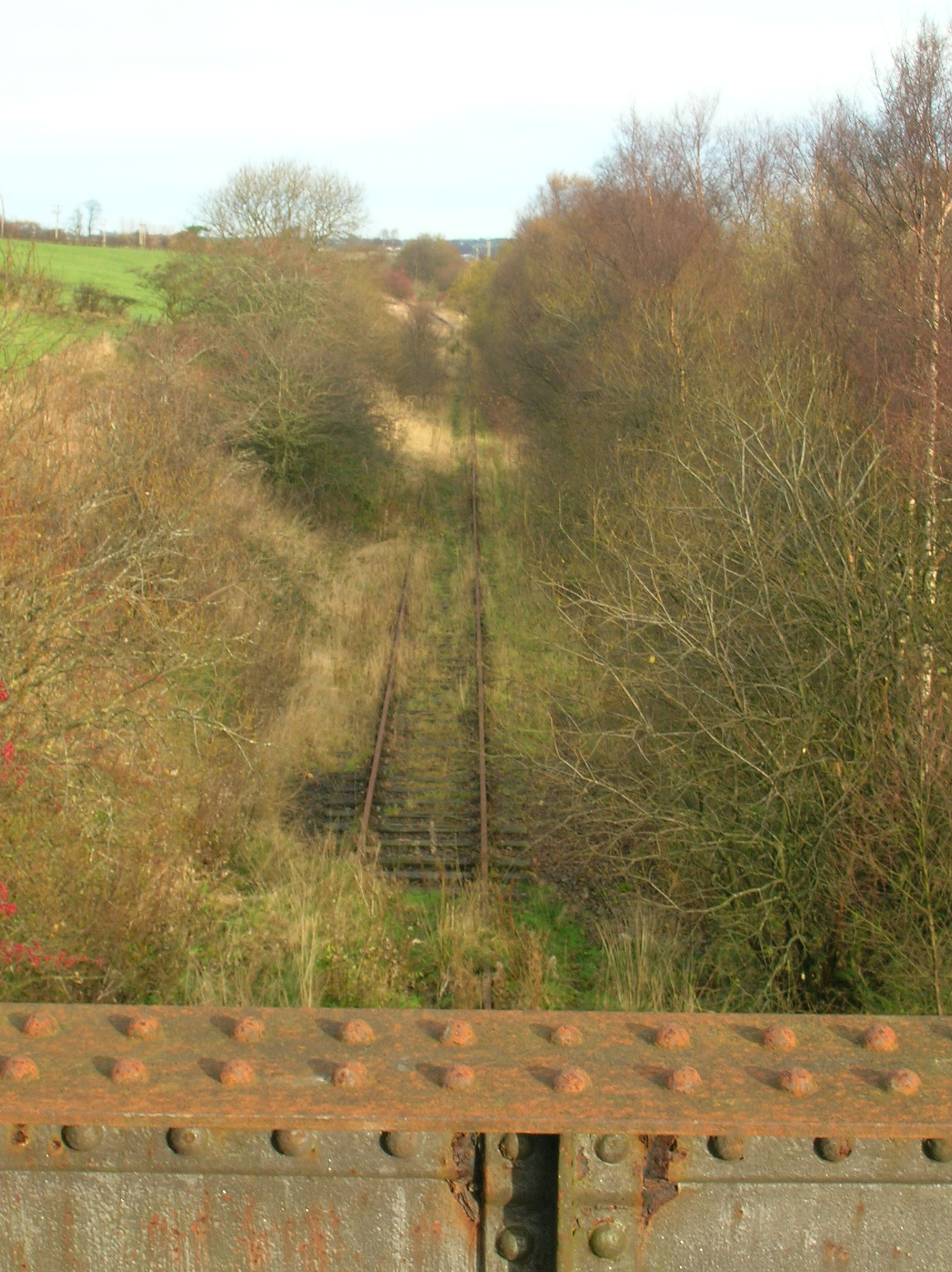
Looking towards Barrmill from the Giffen overbridge

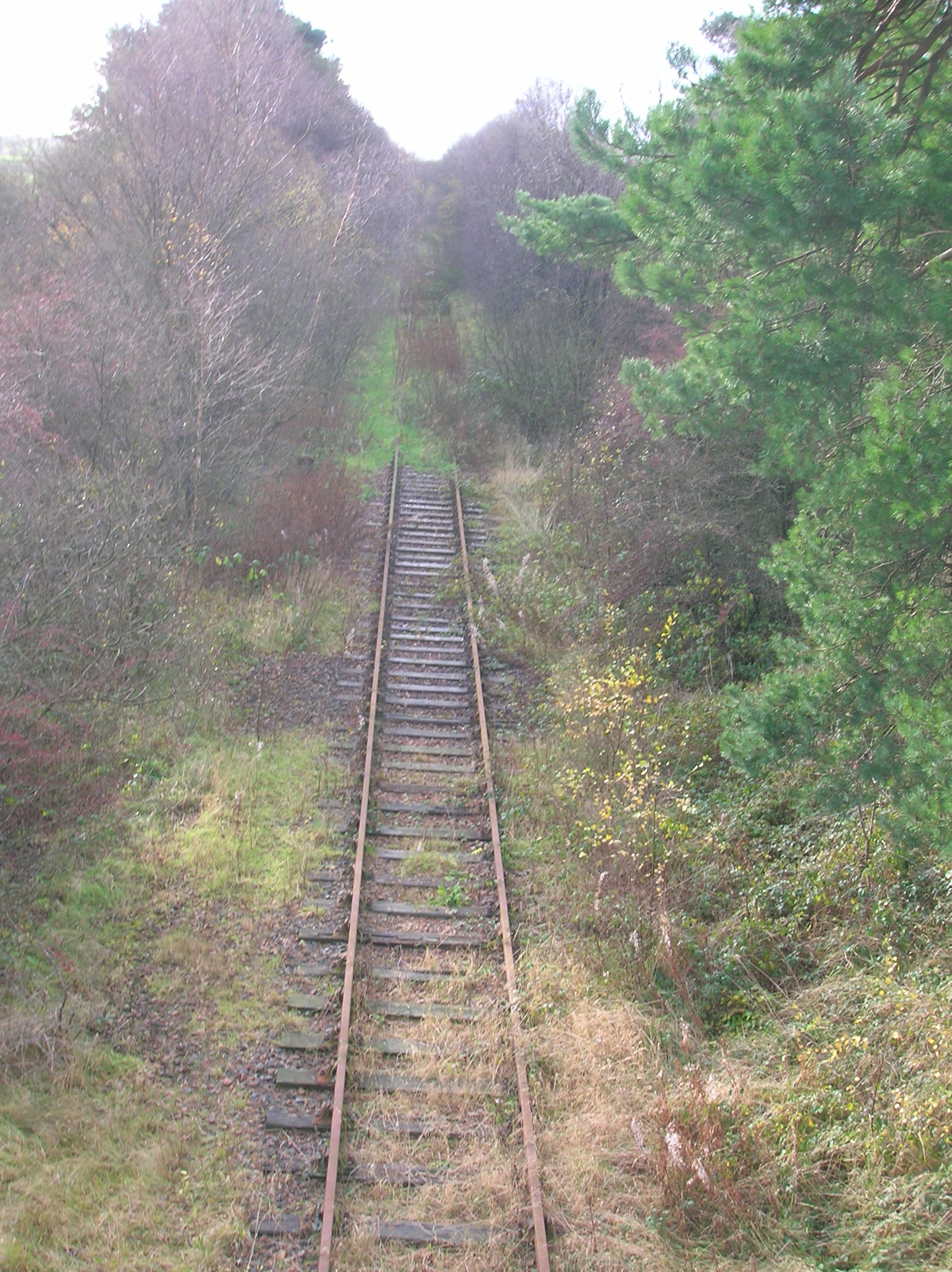
Giffen railway station from the overbridge

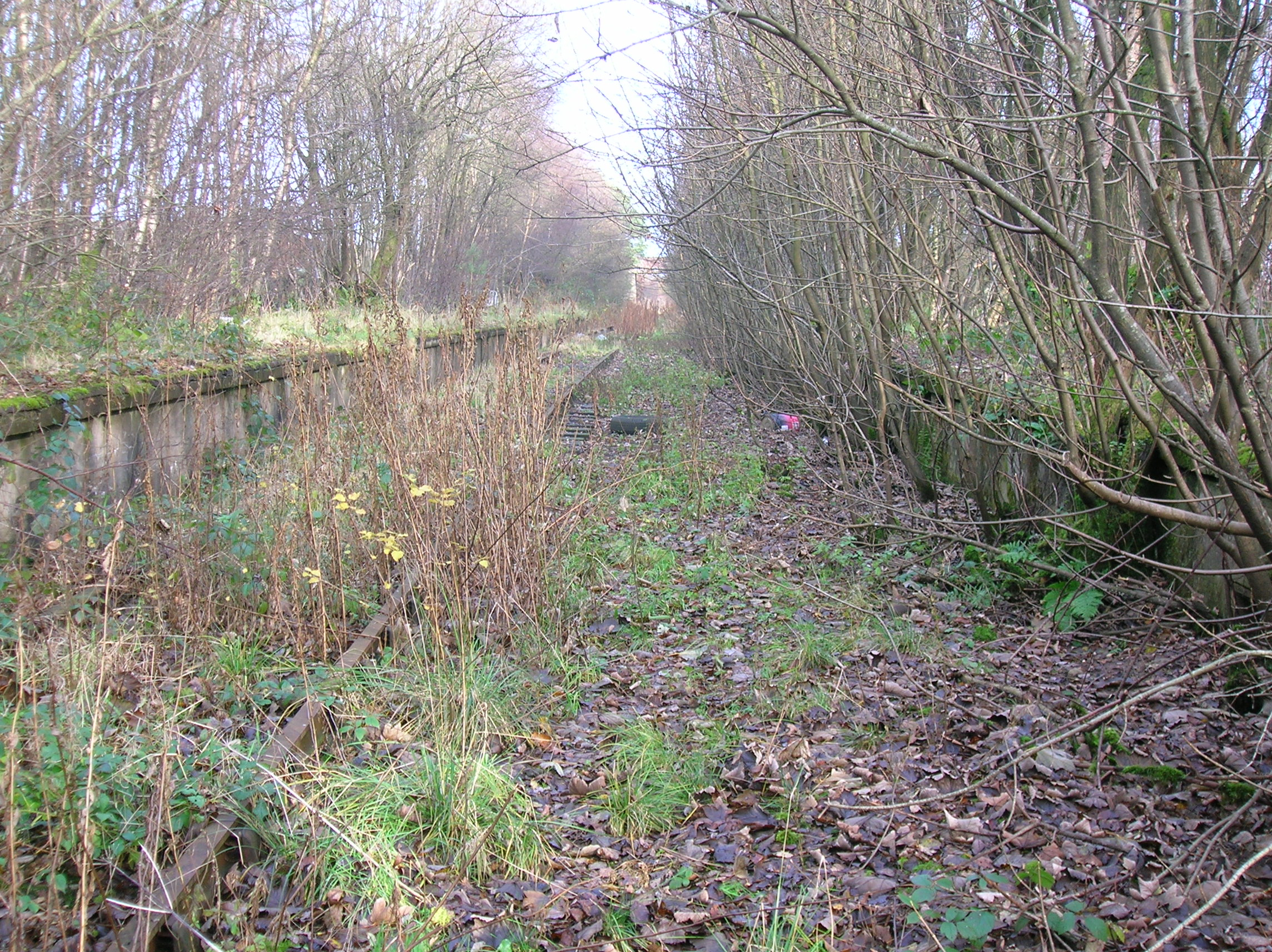
Giffen station looking towards Barrmill

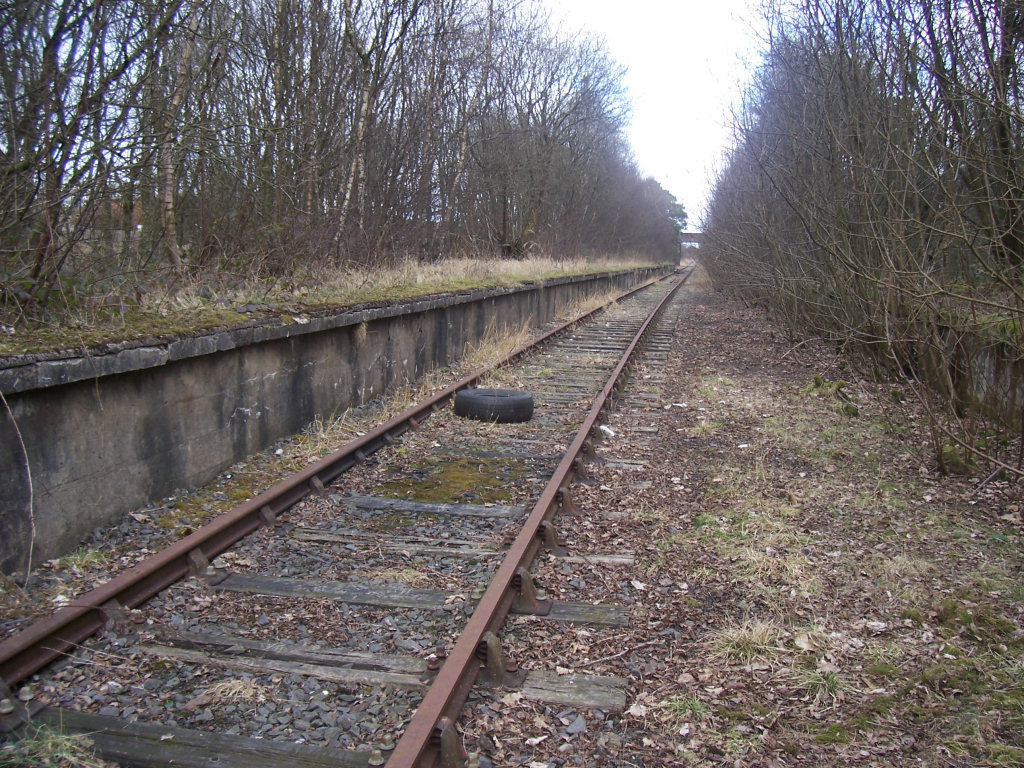
The Old Kilbirnie Junction station, later Giffen station in 2006
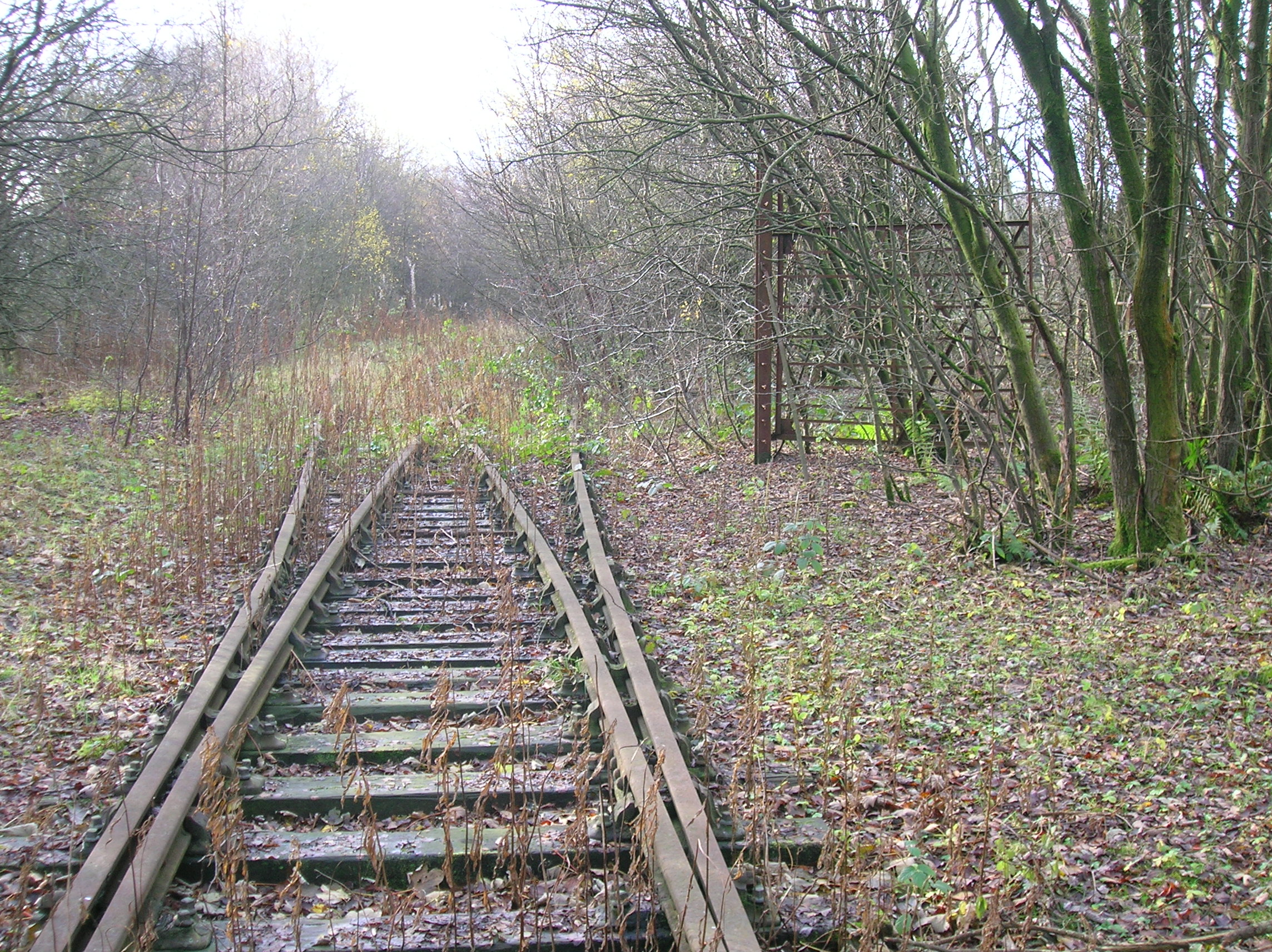
Pointwork and an old security gate

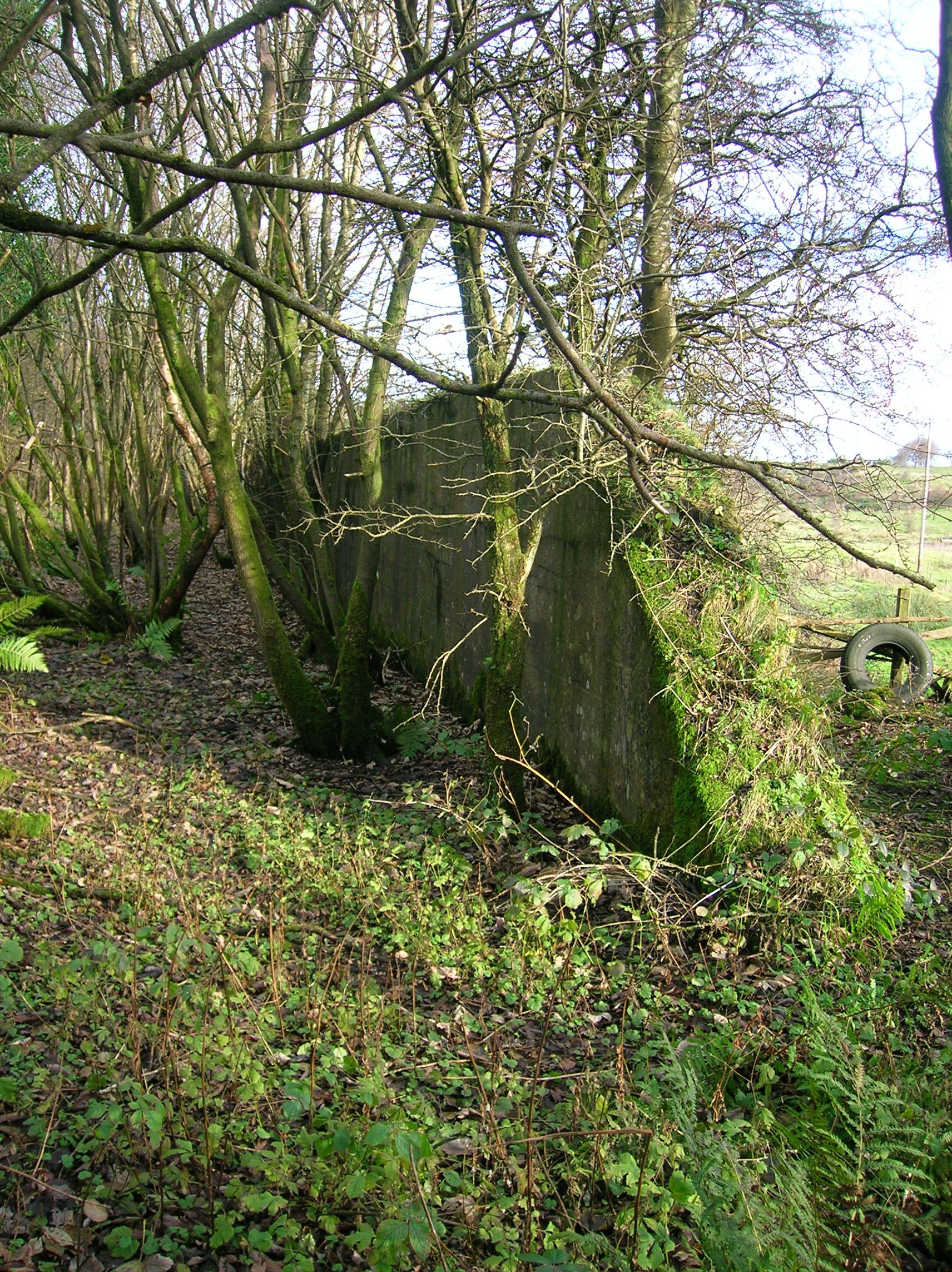
An old blast wall next to the station

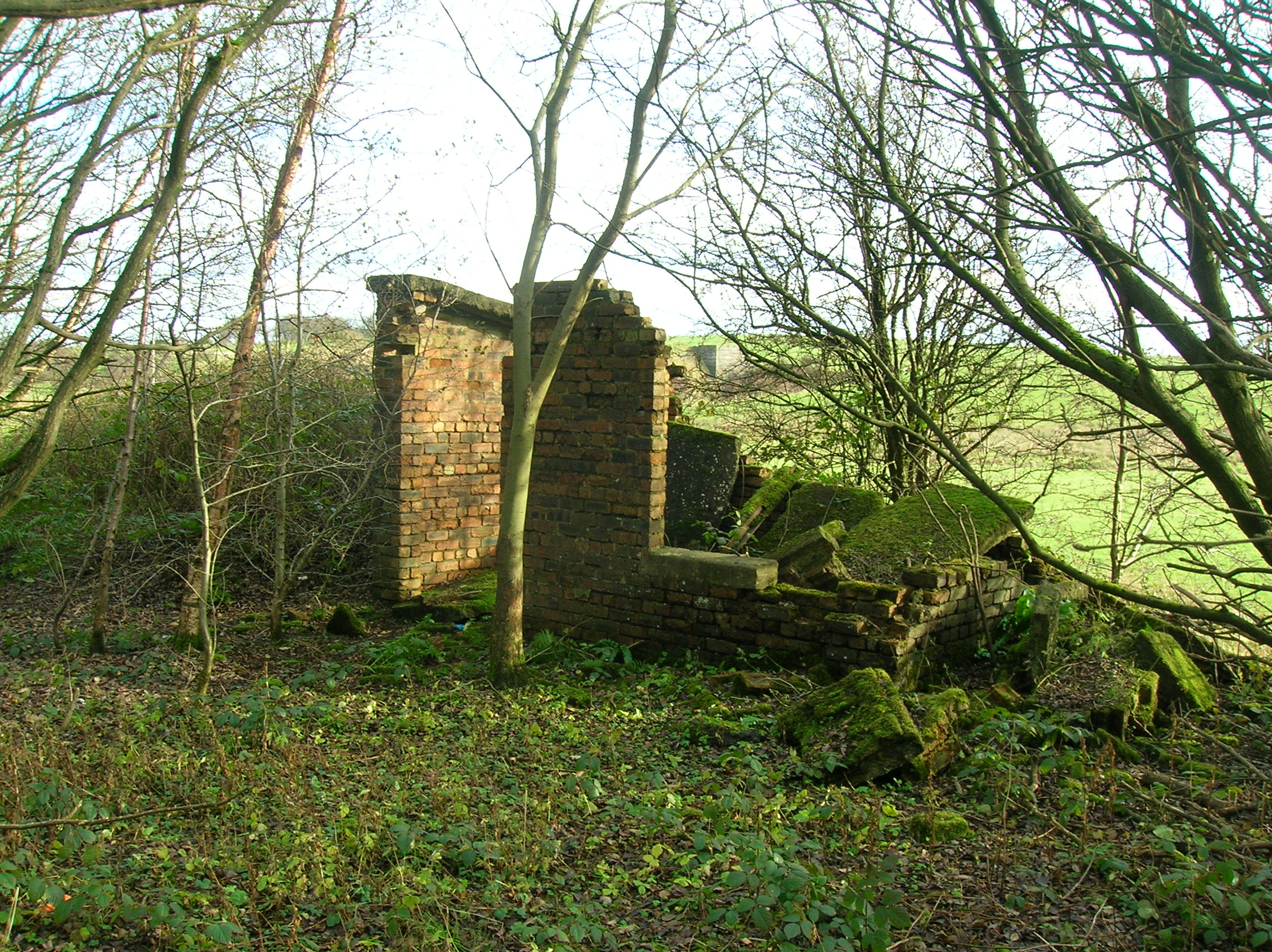
Workmen's hut near the blast wall

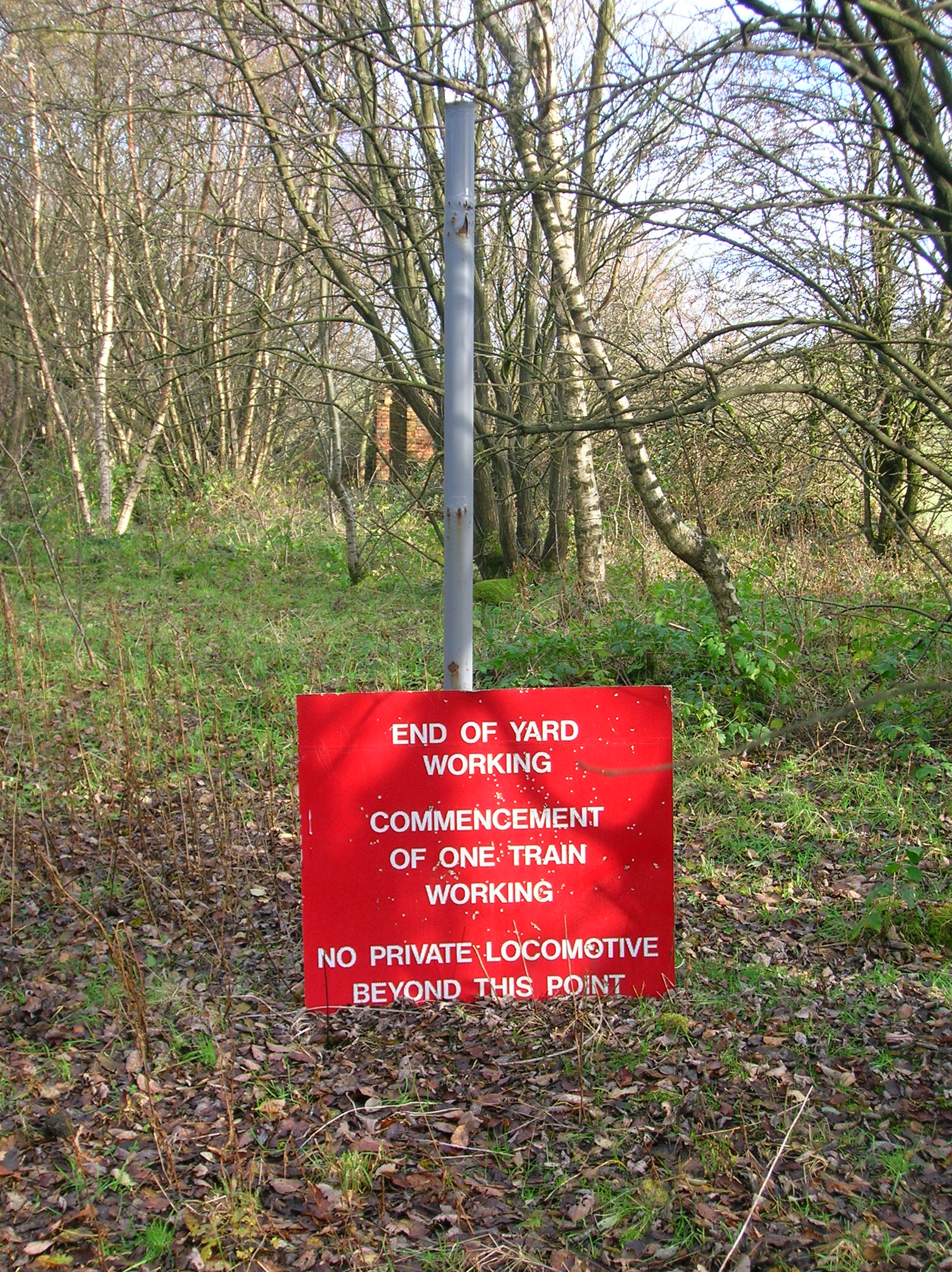
Old sign for munitions traffic operations

== Giffen, Beith, or Nettlehirst limeworks ==
Giffen Limeworks dated from the mid- to late 19th century and later. They were probably the last traditional limeworks to work in Scotland, closing in 1972. A substantial amount remained, the kilns being essentially intact in 2009, with a bank of two single-draw rubble kilns, reinforced with buttresses and with old rails, and heightened in brick. Progressive demolition has been taking place since 2009. Covered conveyors linked the segmental-arched draw holes with a wood-framed, corrugated-iron crushing and bagging mill. The works were at map reference: NS 3645 5073.

=== Limekilns ===
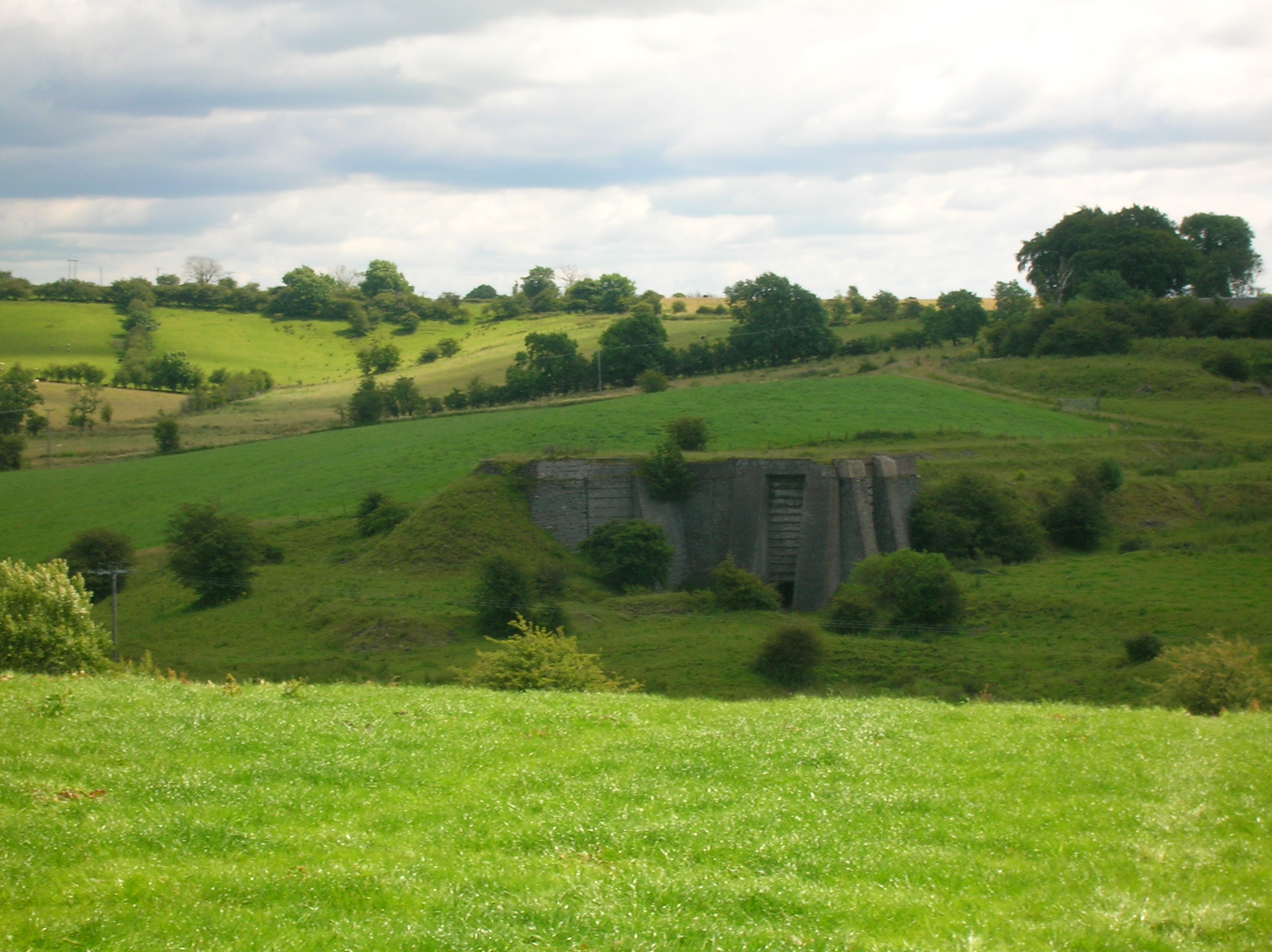
The remains of the old limekiln near Nettlehirst farm

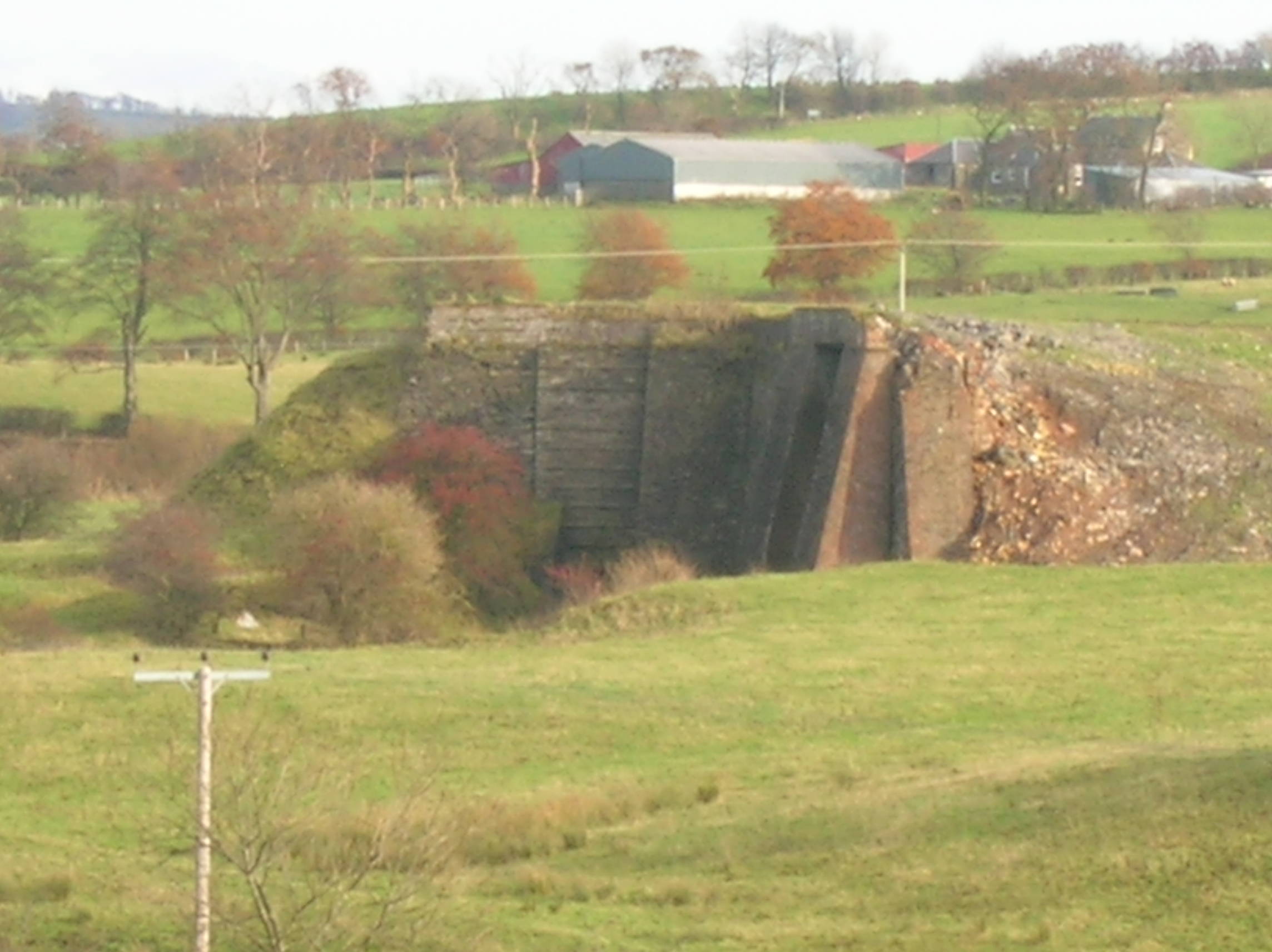
Detail of the old Nettlehirst lime kiln

Limekilns are a common feature of farms in the area, such as Thirdpart, Foreside, Nettlehirst and the Greenhills hamlet; the necessary limestone was quarried extensively in the neighbourhood. Limekilns came into regular use about the 18th century. Large limestone blocks were used for building but the smaller pieces were burnt, using coal dug in the parish to produce lime which was a useful commodity in various ways: it could be spread on the fields to reduce acidity, for lime-mortar in buildings or for lime-washing on farm buildings and was even regarded as cleansing agent.

Views of Giffen, Greenhills, and Barrmill (2007)

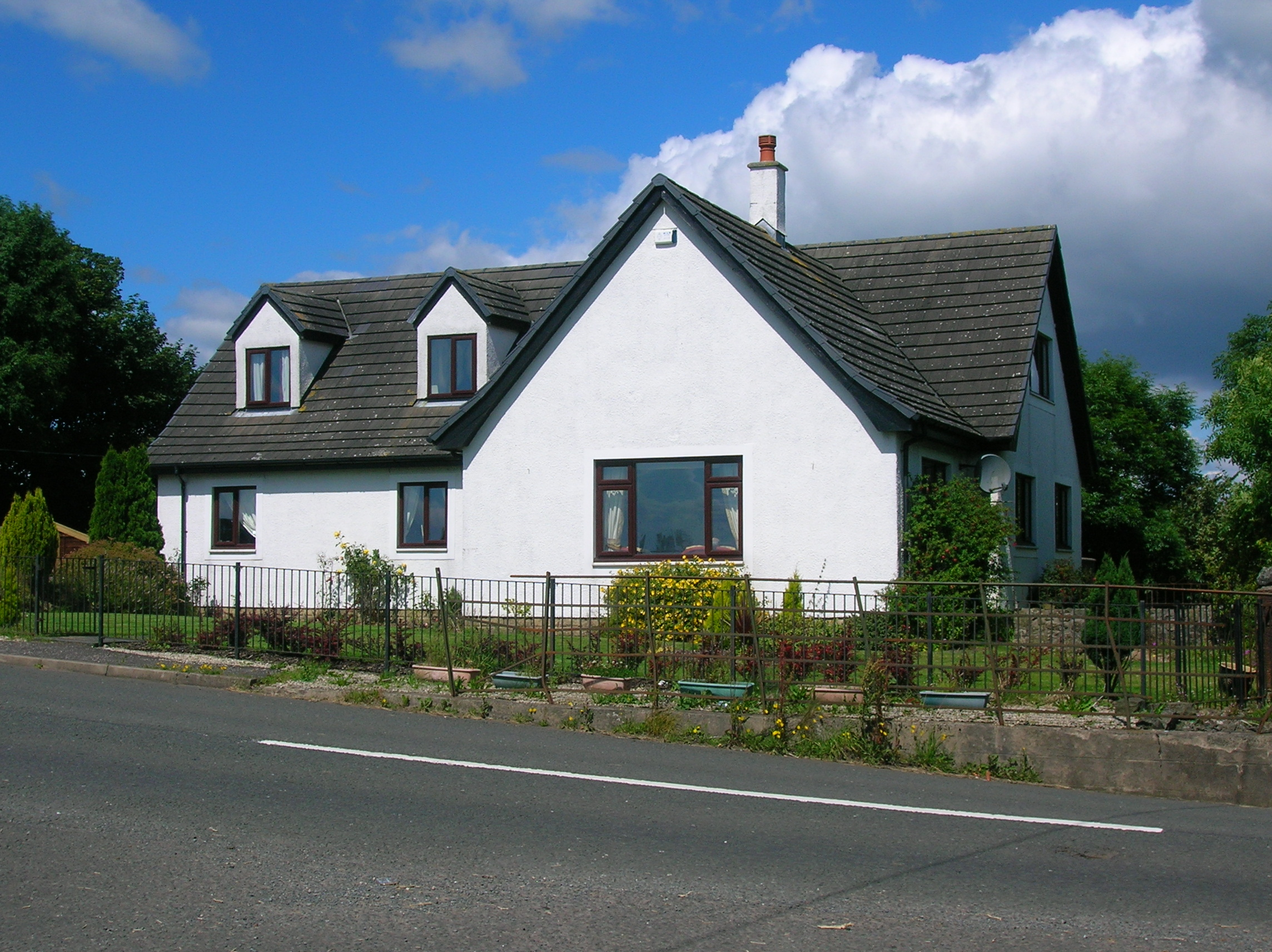
The old school site at Greenhills

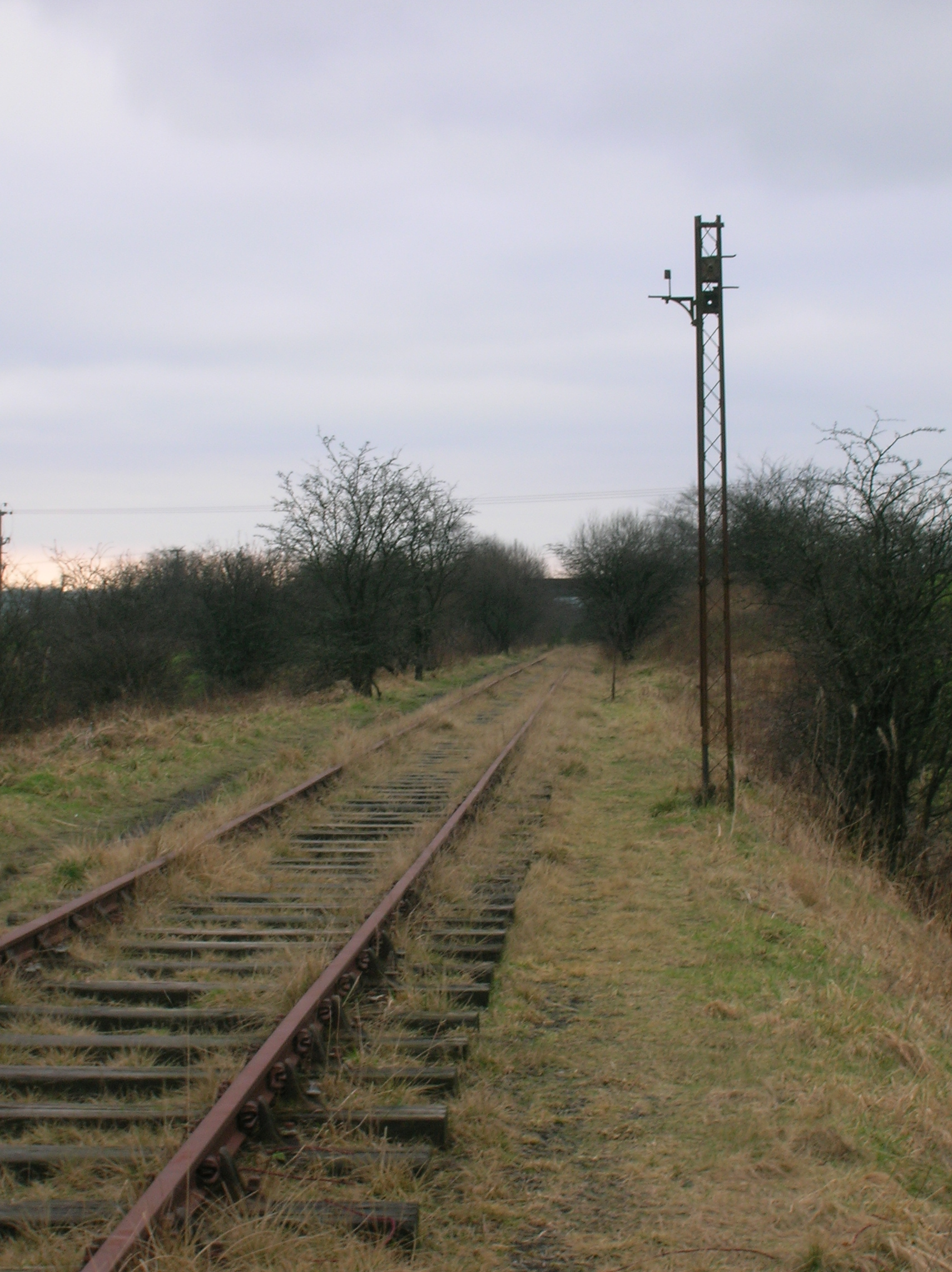
The line and old signal running towards Giffen station

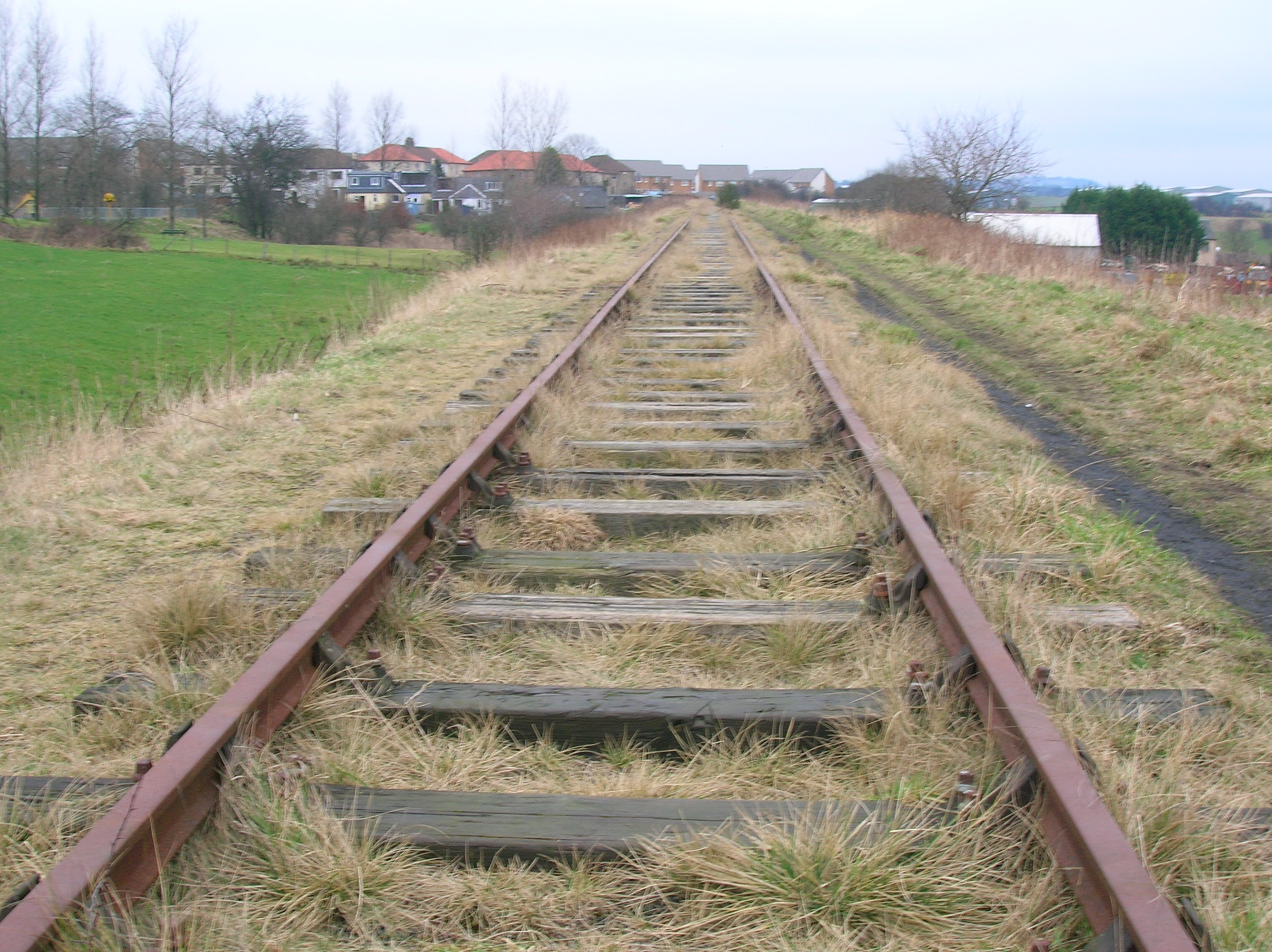
The old railway line running towards Lugton at Barmill

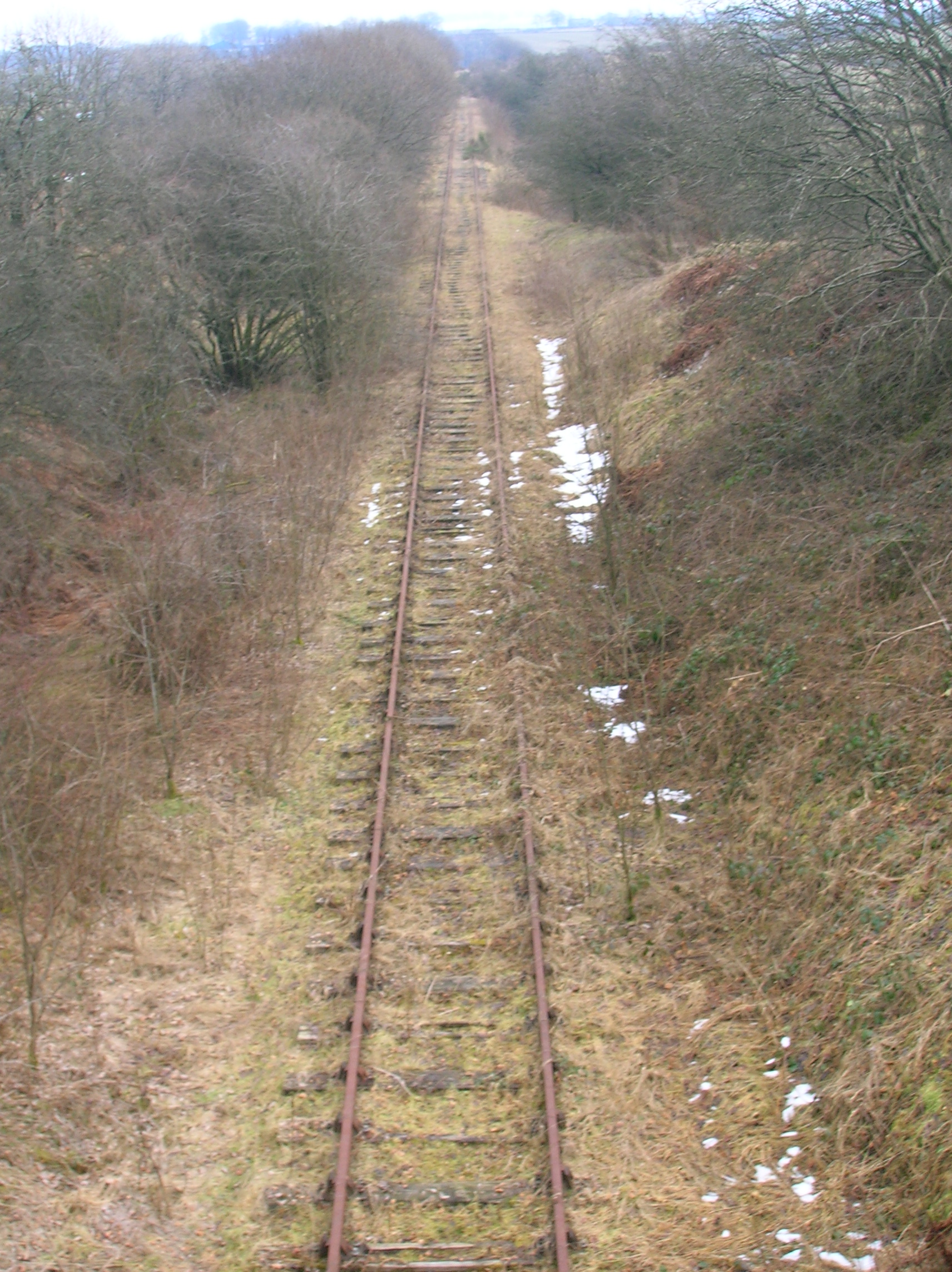
old line near Tandlehill Farm

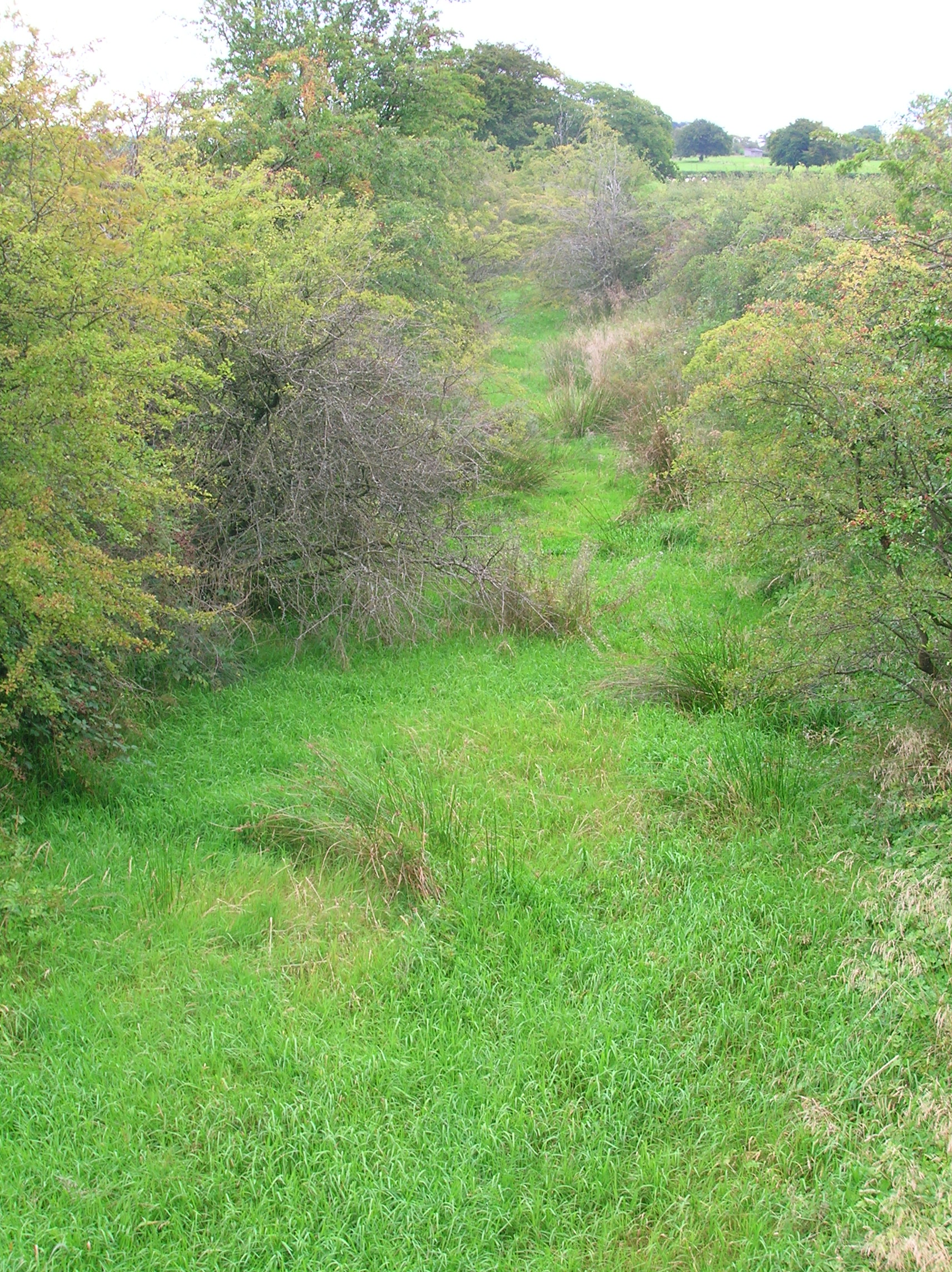
The course of the old 'Hillhead Railway' from Barkip Junction to Broadstone limestone quarry

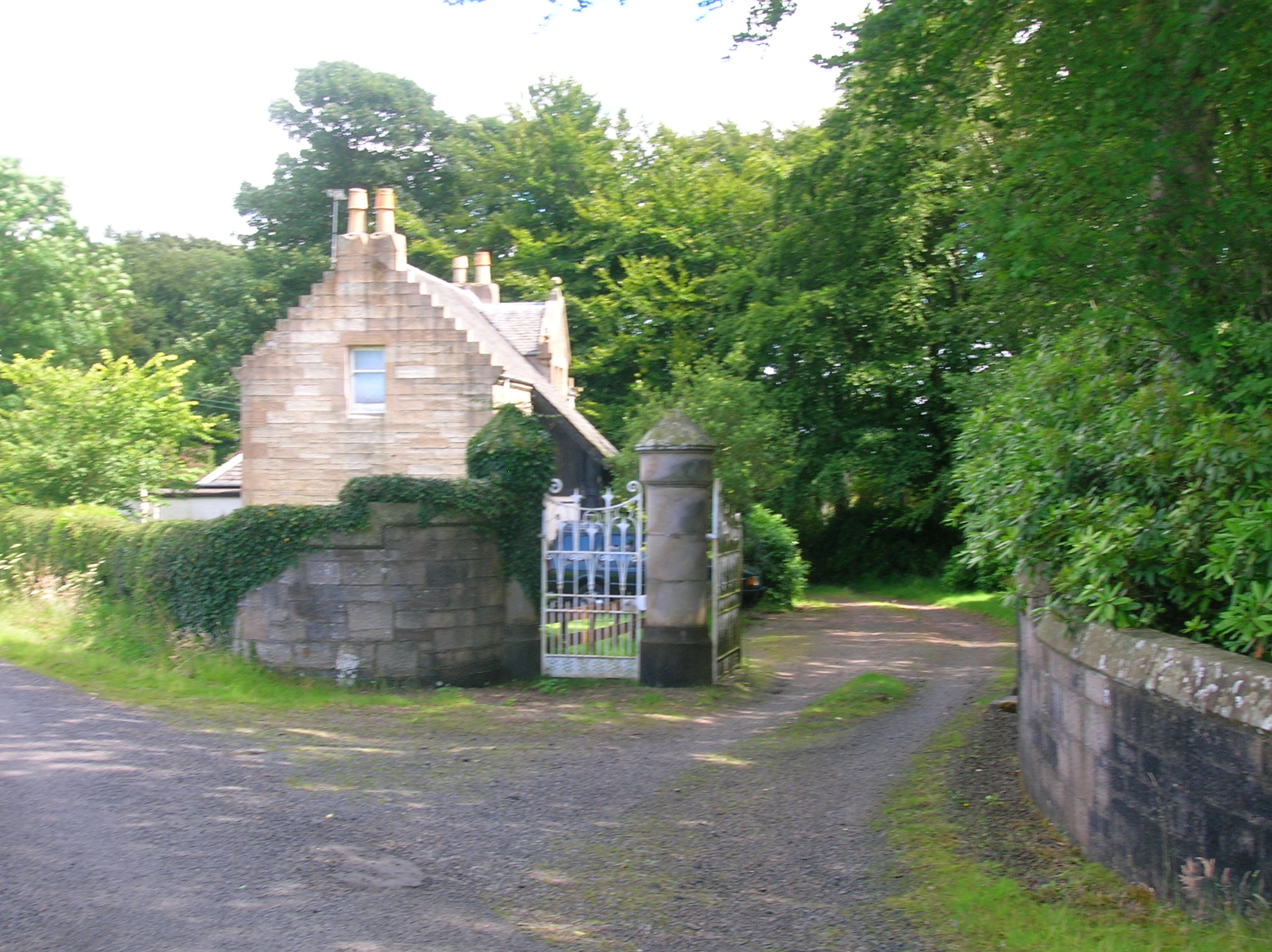
The Giffin House main entrance, near Auchenmade
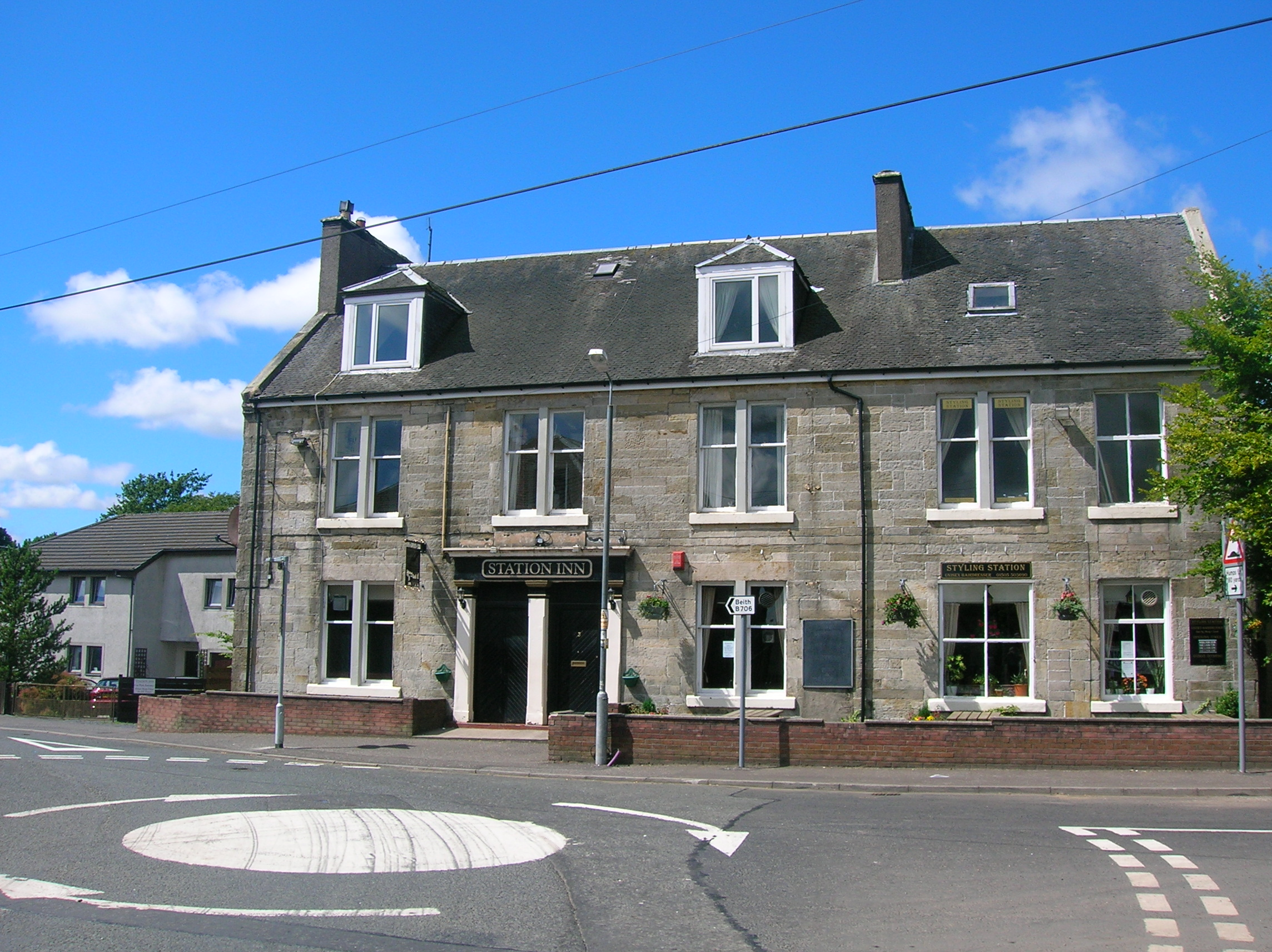
The Old Station Inn in Barrmill

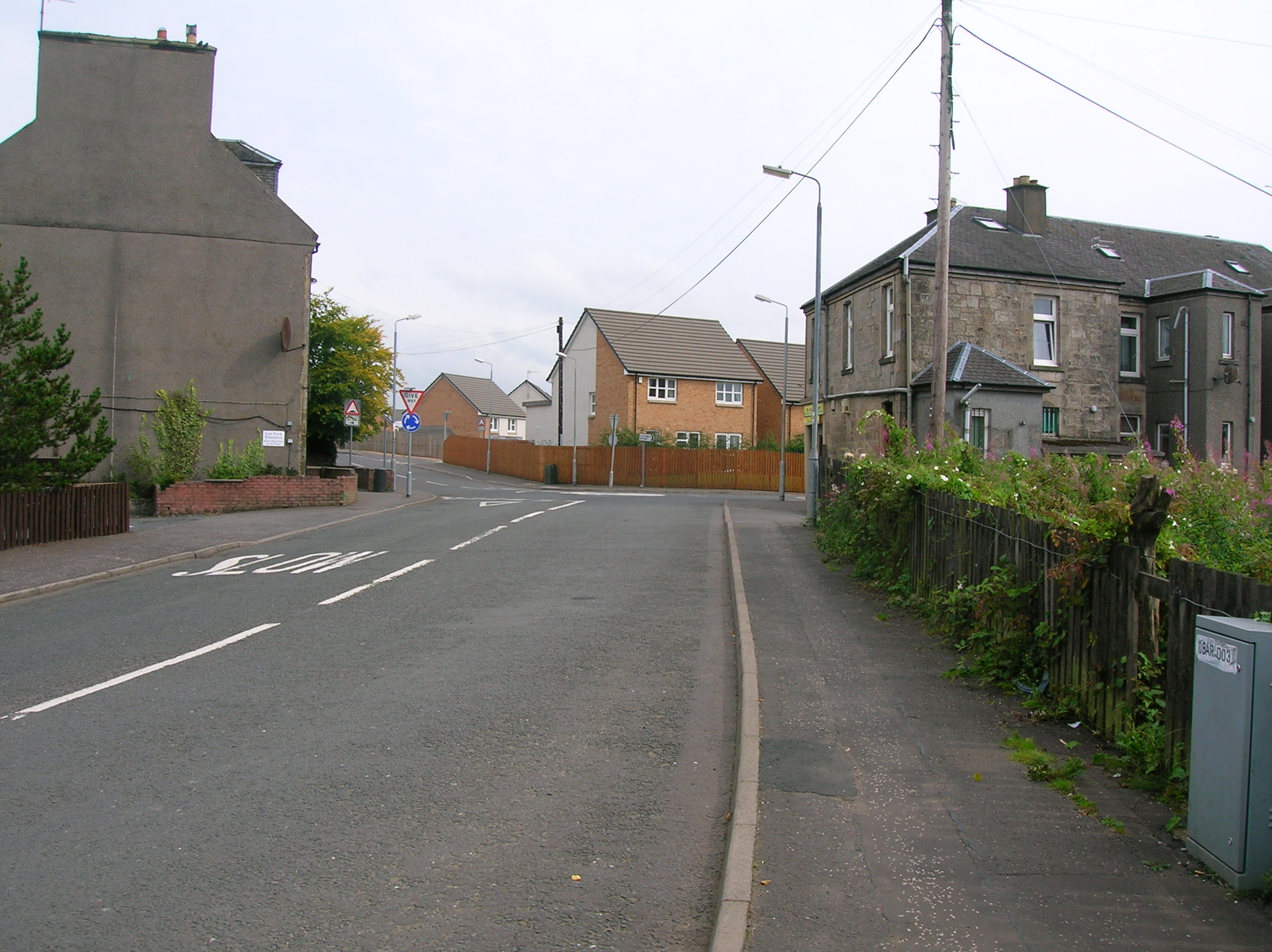
Barrmill crossroads, with hotel and shop

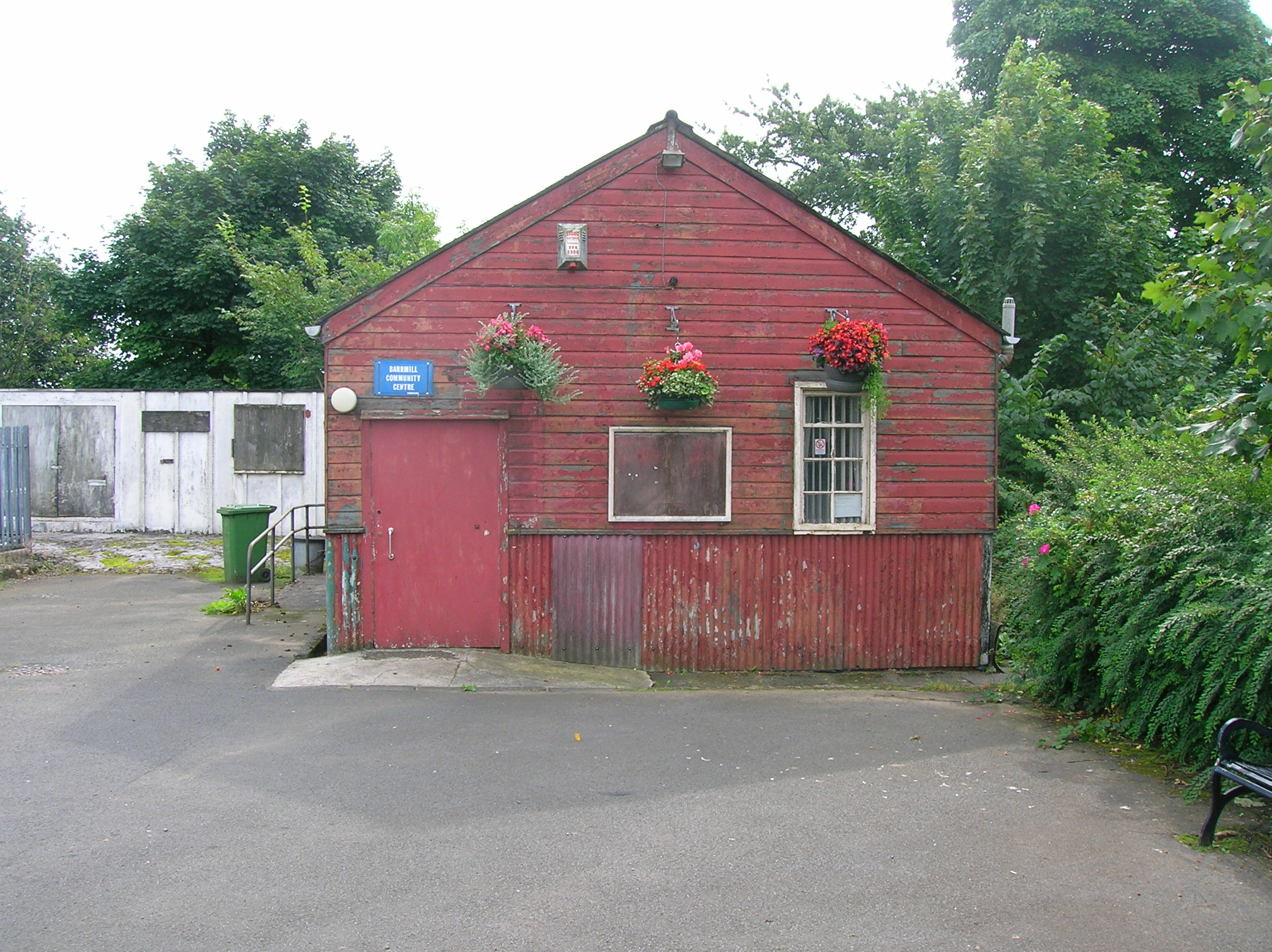
Barrmill's Community Hall

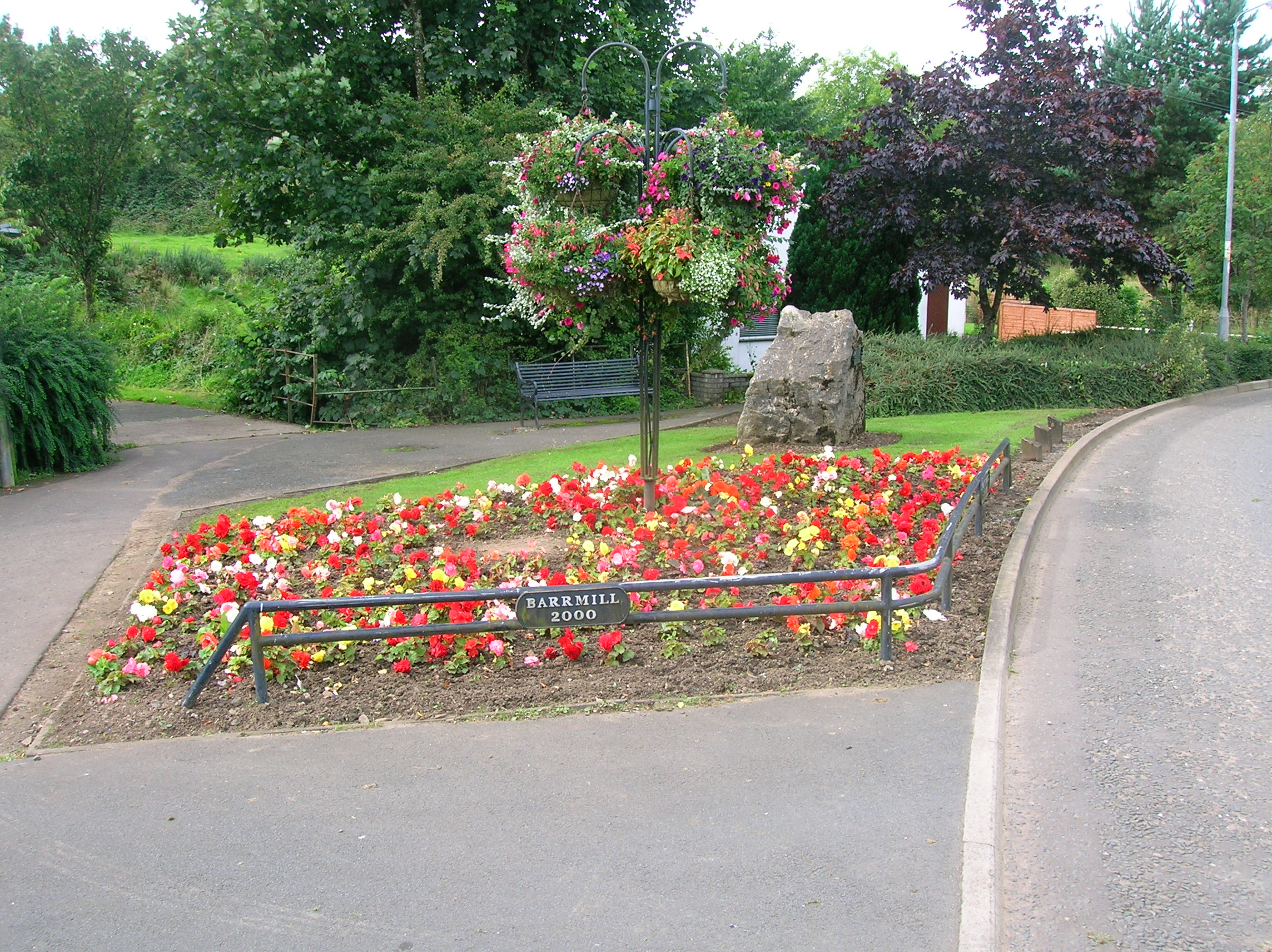
Barrmill's millennium garden

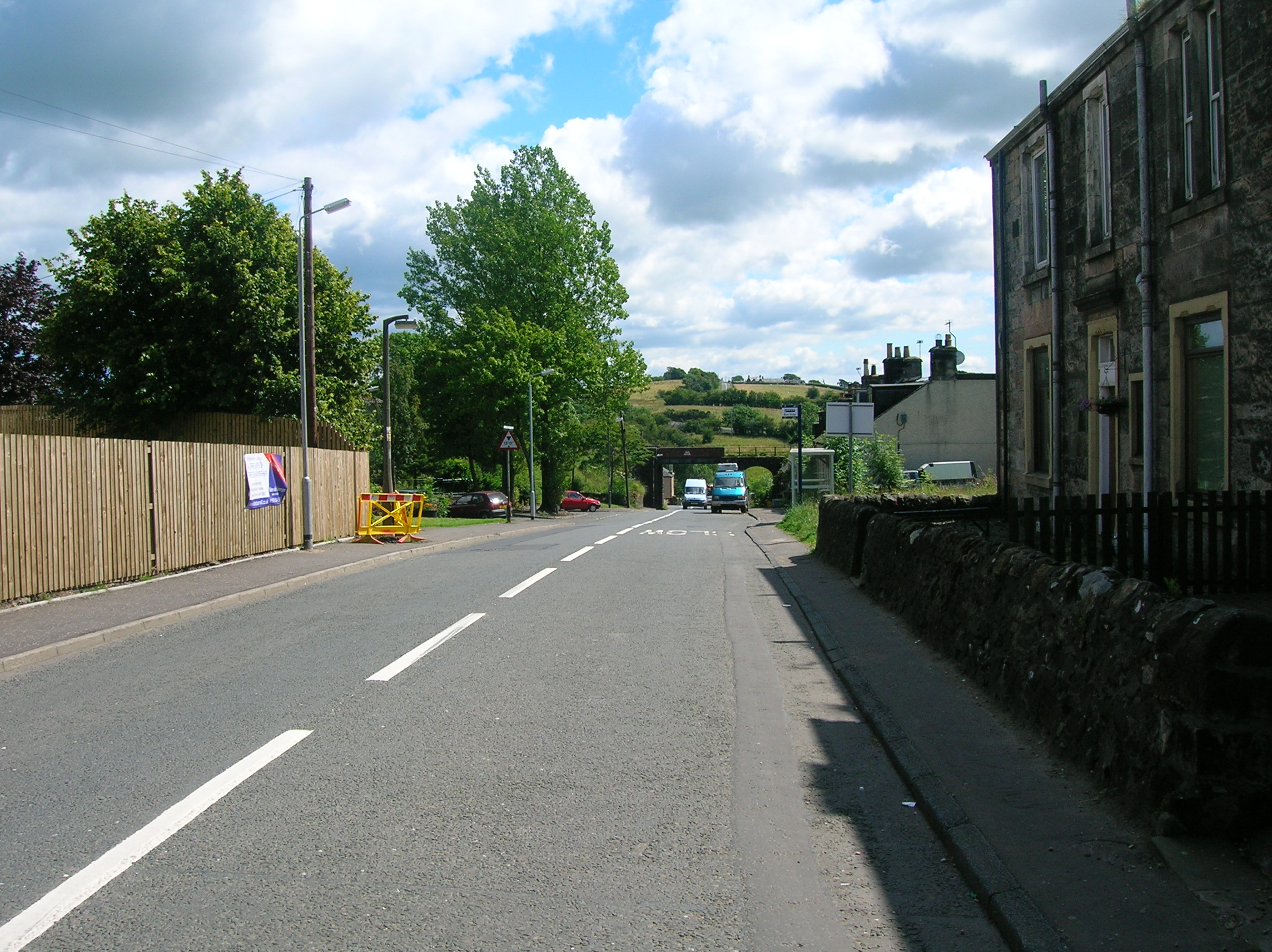
Barrmill's mainstreet with the railway bridge, looking towards Greenhills

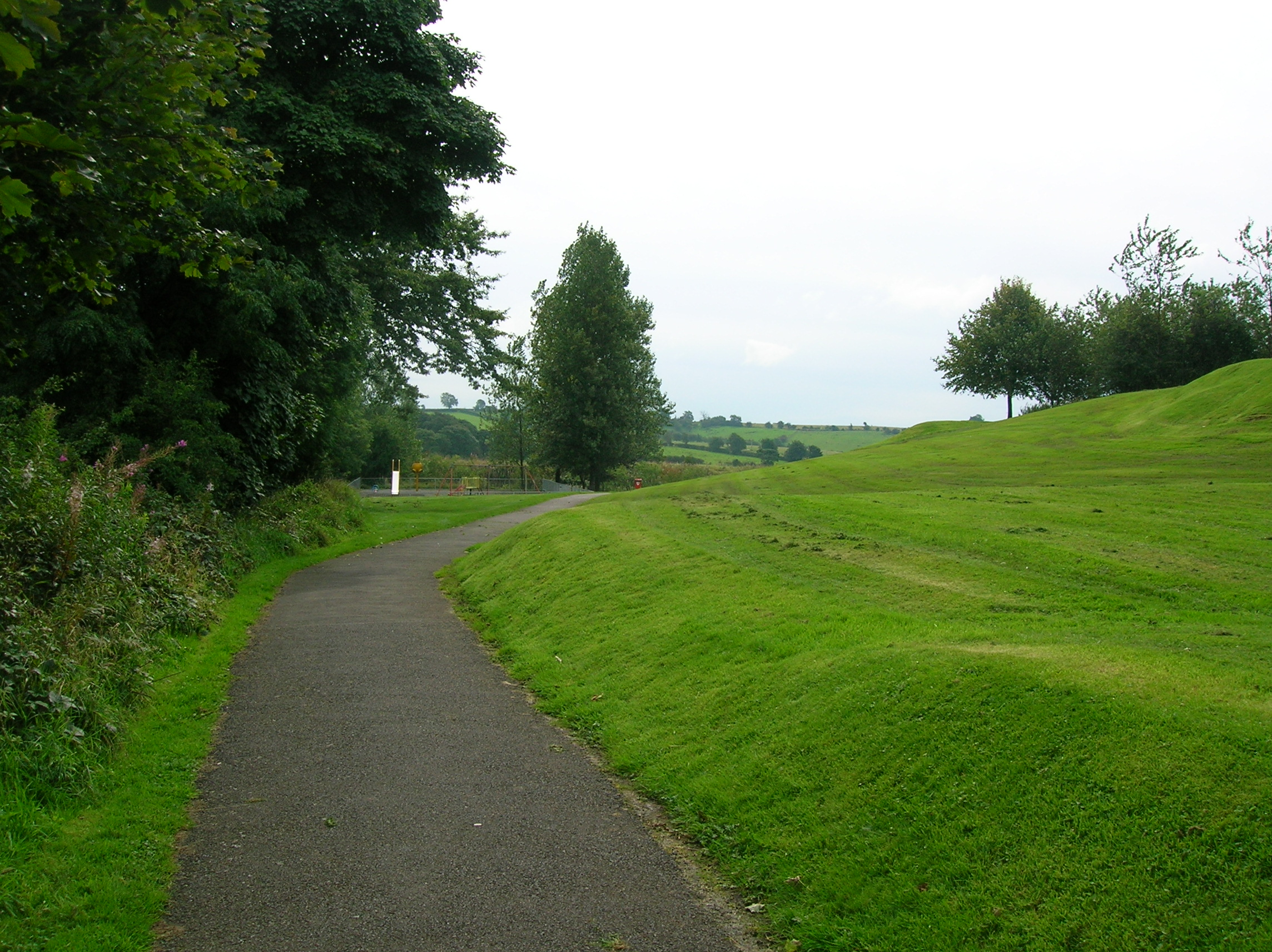
Barrmill's park

== Burnhouse (The Trap) ==
This village or hamlet in North Ayrshire, known locally as the 'Trap', short for 'Man Trap' as the village lies on the old turnpike road from Beith to Kilmarnock, and the more recent and busy Lochlibo Road from Irvine to Glasgow via Lugton where travellers on their return from markets in the old days were encouraged to stop and spend their money at the inn; it was so named by the farmers wives and eventually it was shorted to 'The Trap'. A Crossroads Inn is marked on John Thomson's map of 1828 and in 1858 it had two inns at the crossroads, the Burnhouse Inn and the Waggoners Inn, no longer shown on the 1911 OS.

What is now Burnhouse Manor hotel was present as a private house on the 1858 OS map and as the 'Manor House' in 1911. In the 1870s, whilst nearby Trearne House was being built, Mr and Mrs Ralston-Patrick lived for some time in Burnhouse Manor until the new house was ready for them. A toll house was located on the Dunlop side of the crossroads on the Lochlibo Road, on the Laigh Gree Farm side; it has been demolished.

Burnhouse Manor and 'The Trap' village (2008)

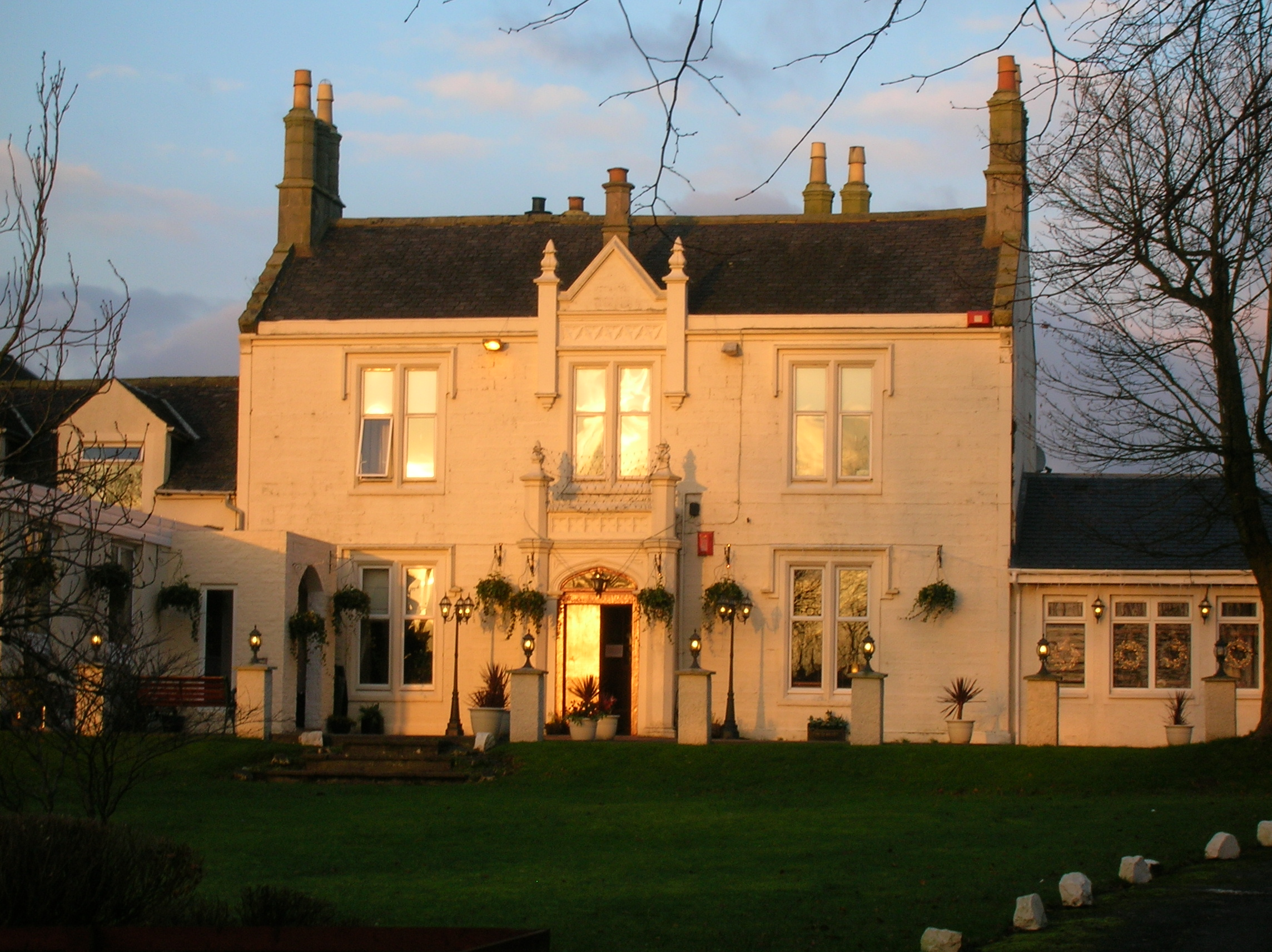
The Burnhouse Manor Hotel

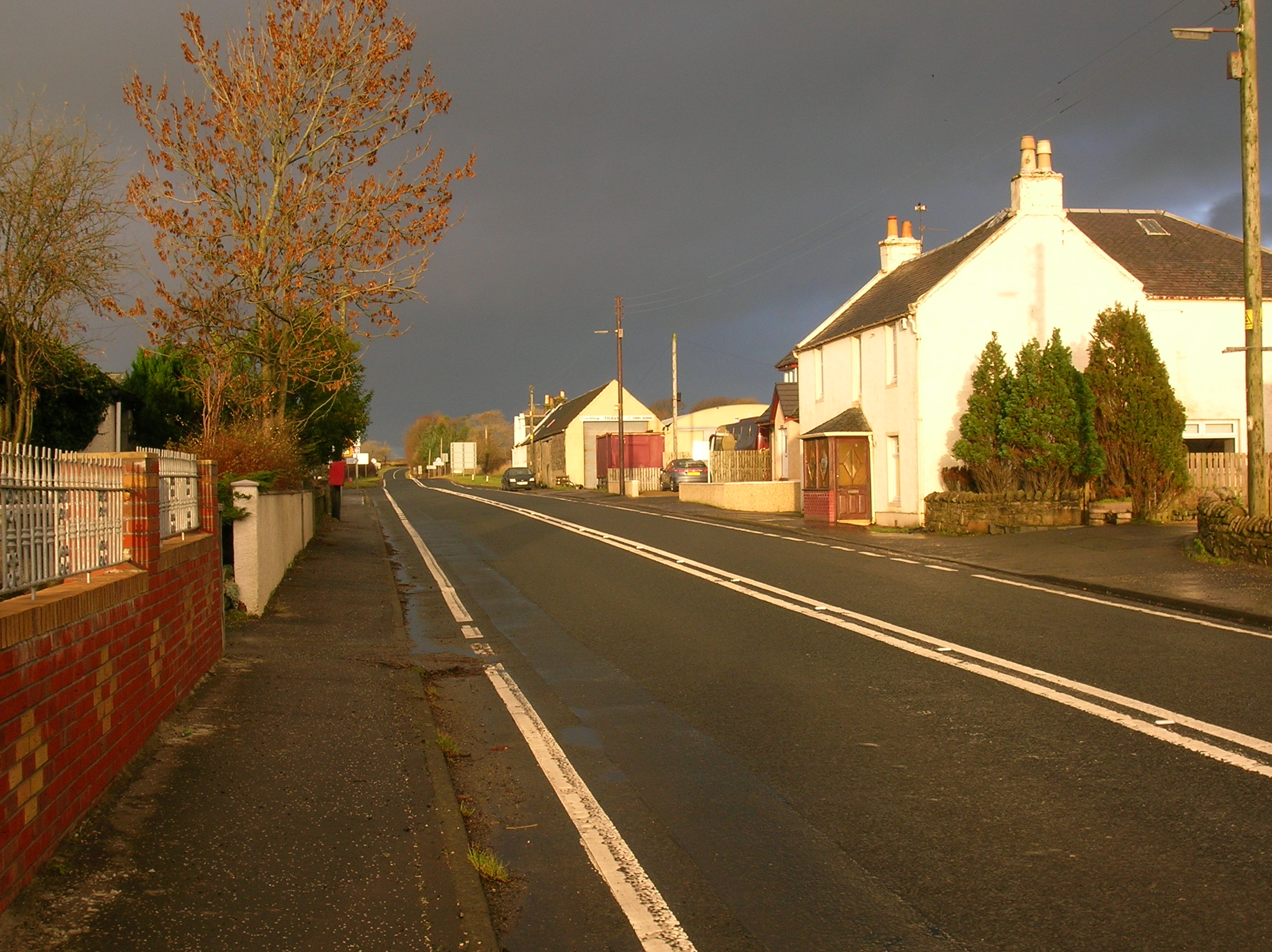
Burnhouse village looking towards Lugton

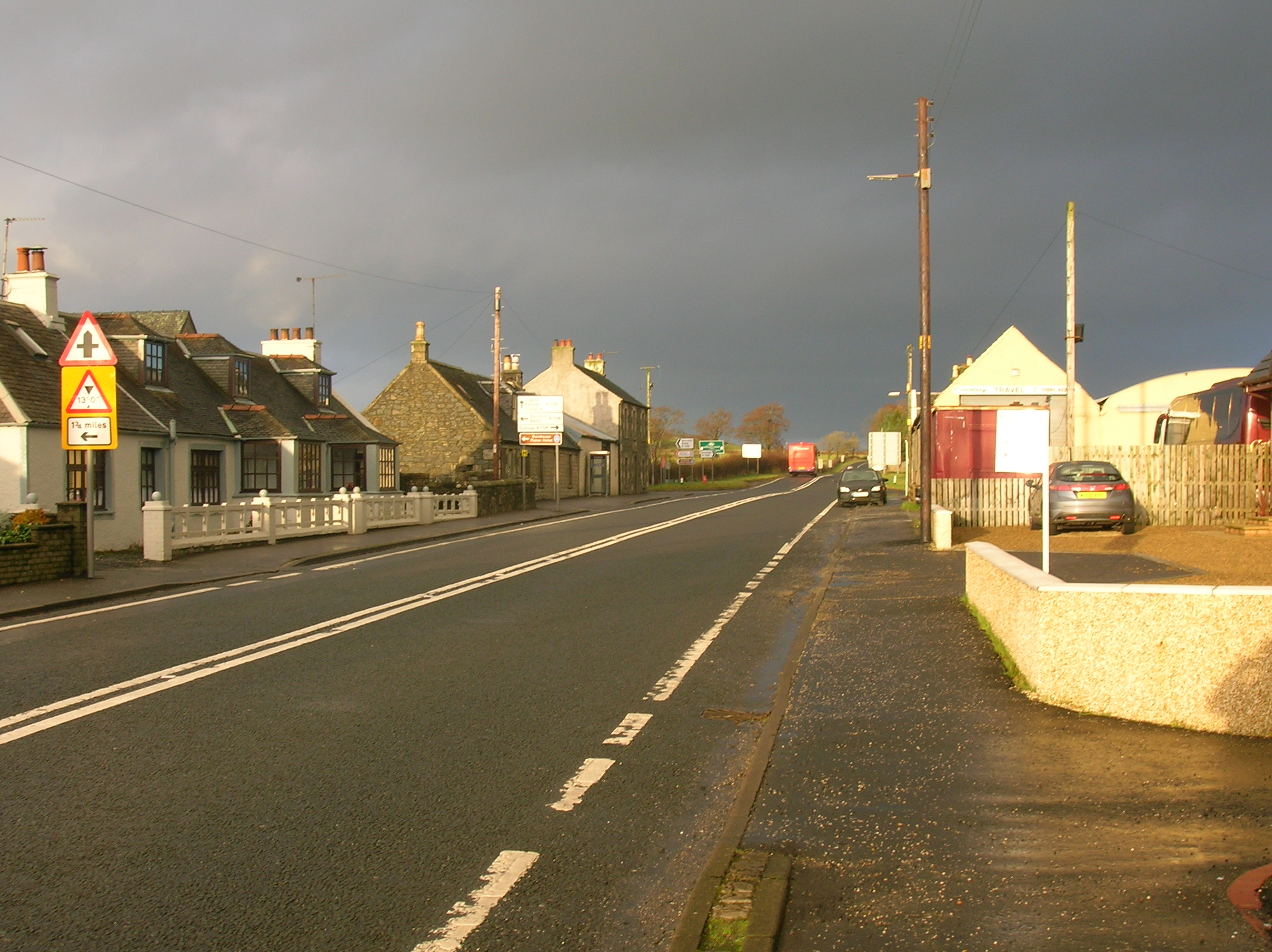
Another view looking towards Lugton

== Additional evidence from maps ==
The 1858 OS map shows the spelling as 'Giffen' and indicates the presence of a small whinstone quarry at the bottom of the brae that runs towards Burnhouse. This quarry expanded over the years and eventually destroyed the site of the castle on the Giffen craigs. The castle ruins are clearly marked in 1858, but not afterwards.

== Drumbuie ==
Drumbuie House, built in 1702, is one of the oldest inhabited houses in the Beith area and has been the home of the Boyd family for at least three generations. Drumbuie was part of the Barony of Giffen and was feud out to various local millers and farmers in the 17th century. Close records that Drumbuie Farm incorporates an early 18th-century two-storey house, originally thatched, which was built around 1736 for Hugh Patrick, this being stated on a plaque on the 1815 addition. A James Nevin of Drumbuie was a witness to the will of Hugh Nevin of Kirkwood in 1677. Drumbuie mill was located nearby on the Dusk Water, however no obvious physical remains are extant.

== Mossend Farm ==
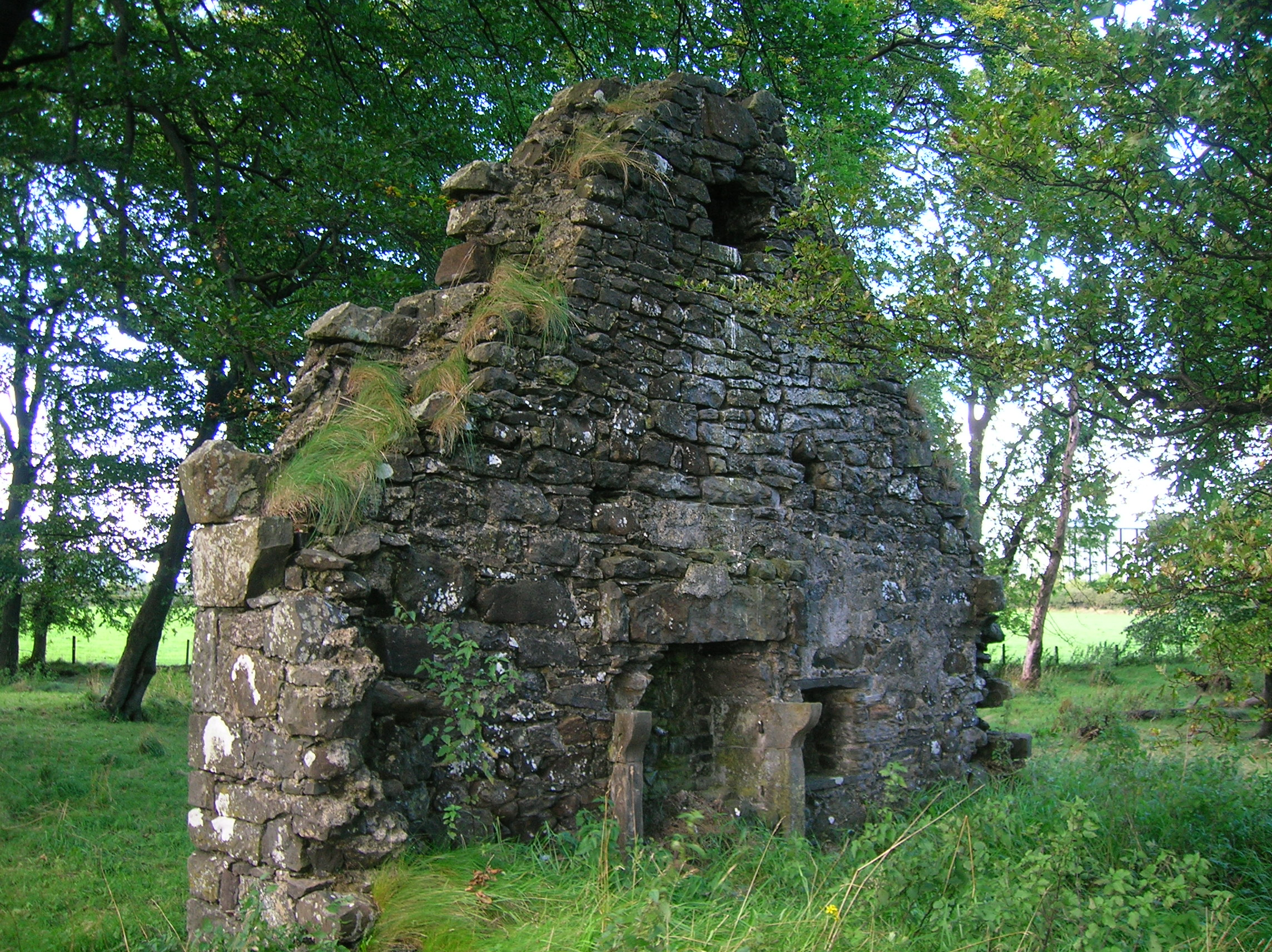
Ruins of Mossend Farm

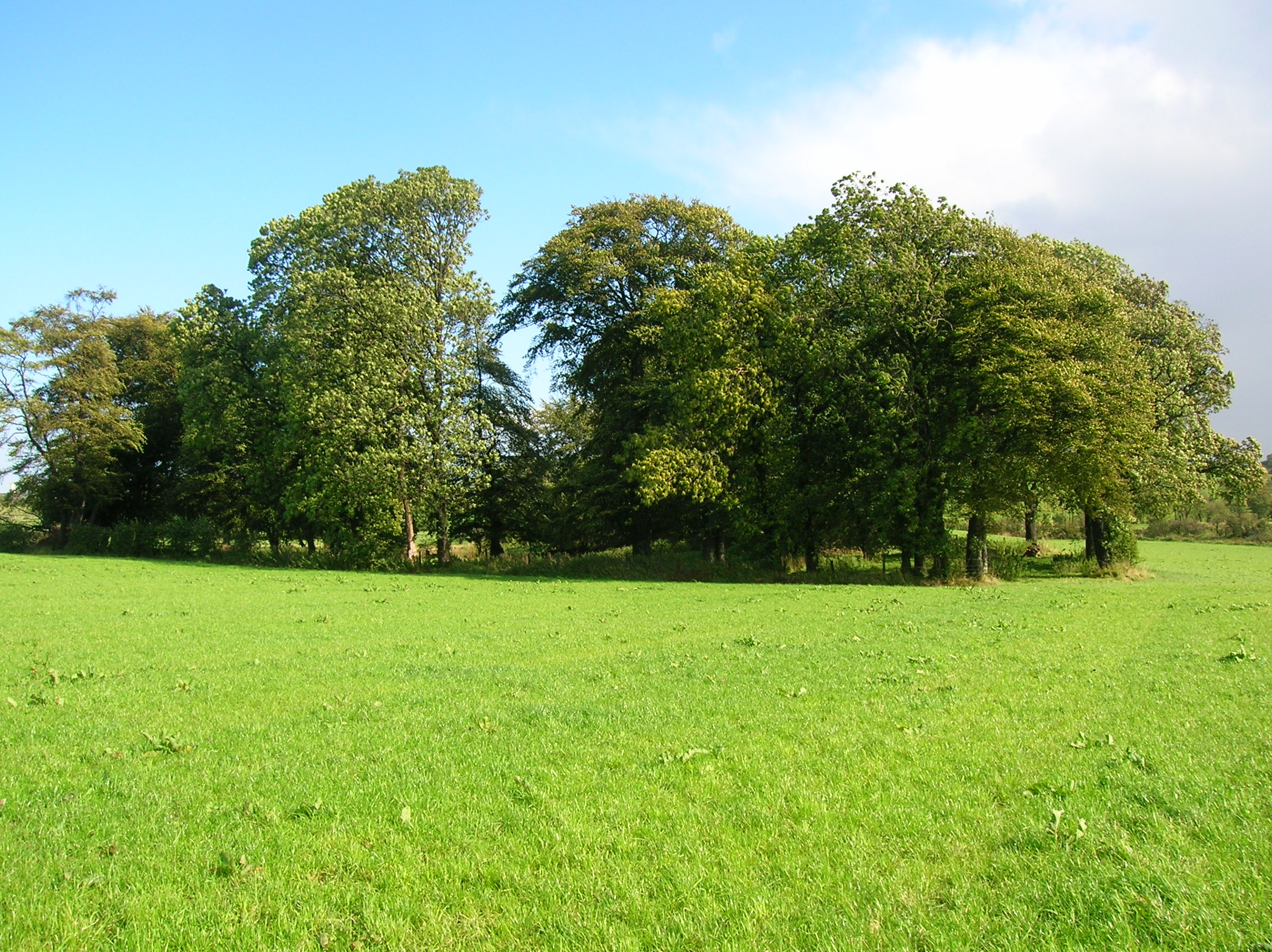
The copse at Mossend Farm

This may have been the site of a minor mansion house at one time, however by the 1920s only a ruin remained. A whinstone quarry was located to the east of the dwelling. The last occupants of Mossend were George and Ellen Black who used to ride into Beith on a small buggy behind a piebald pony. George was a manufacturer of curling stones, possibly using the whinstone from the Mossend quarry.

== Local history and traditions ==
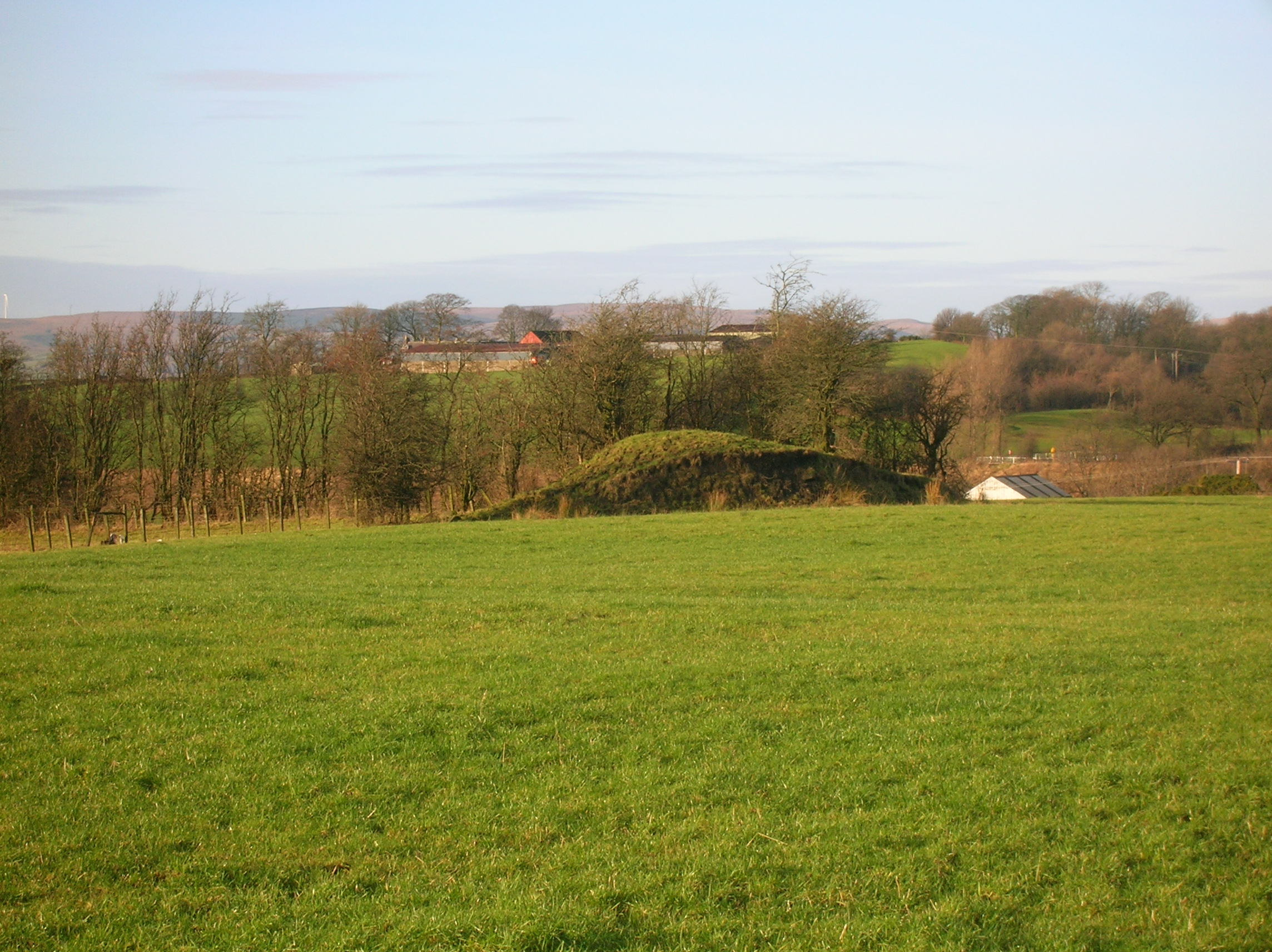
A mound near Greenhill farm

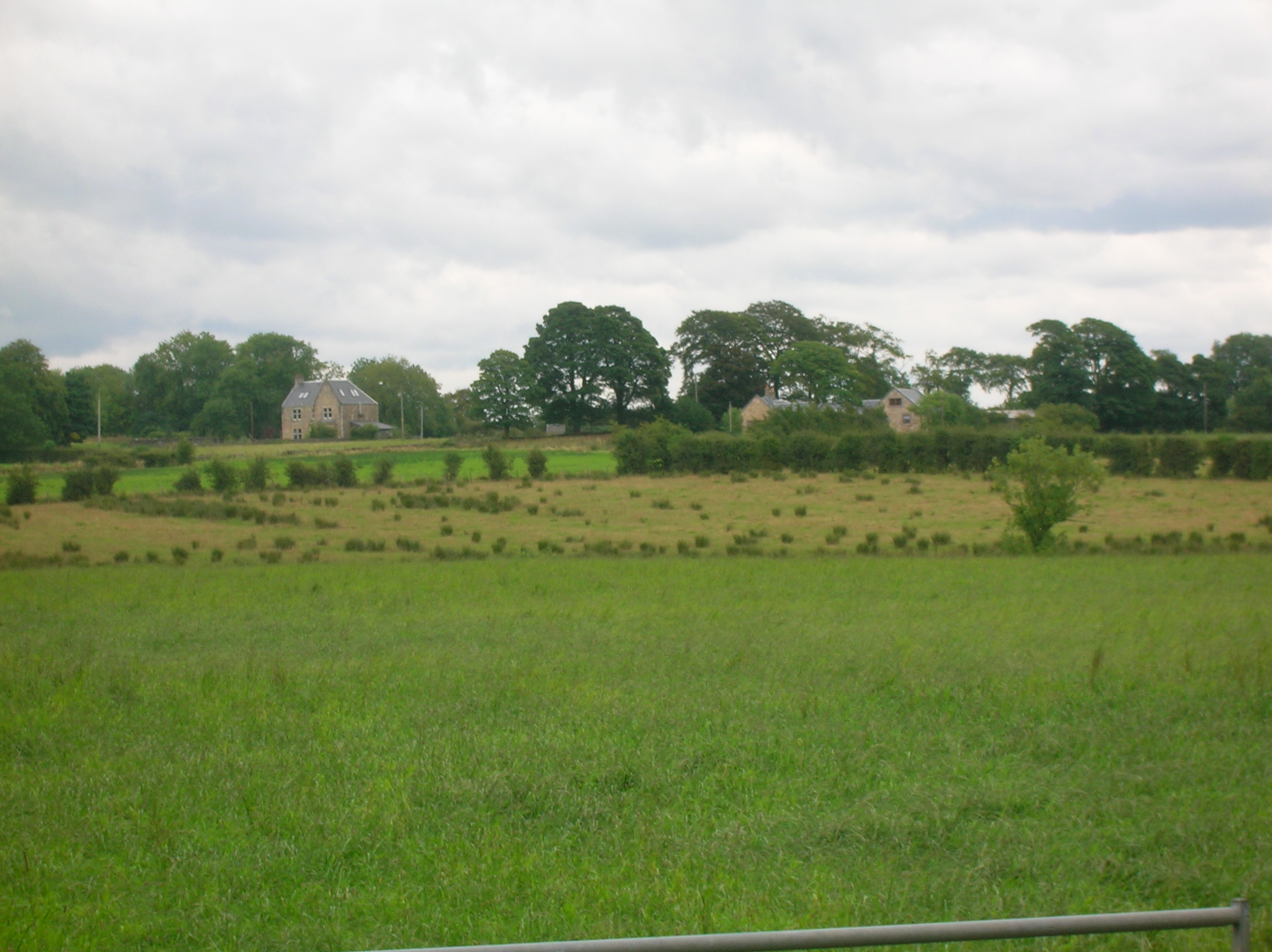
Dockra and South Border Farms

The Ayrshire Directory 1837 by Pigot & Co comments, a year before Giffen Castle collapsed, on ...the stately ruined castle of the Montgomeries. The same publication also lists a Land Surveyor named John Giffin and a John Giffen who was associated with the schools.

A small hoard of 16th-century coins was found on 7 March 1958 by A Wilson and A M Raeside when ploughing 250 yards (230 m) southwest of Mains of Giffen. The coins had been placed in the bronze container of a small nest of weights, 1 1/2 inches in diameter. This box, and 12 of the 19 coins were retained by the National Museum of Antiquities of Scotland (NMAS). All Scottish, they dated between 1558 (a billon "nonsunt" of Mary) and 1574 (a half-merk of James VI). The coins are mostly half and quarter-merks of James VI; they were probably hidden in the later 1570s.

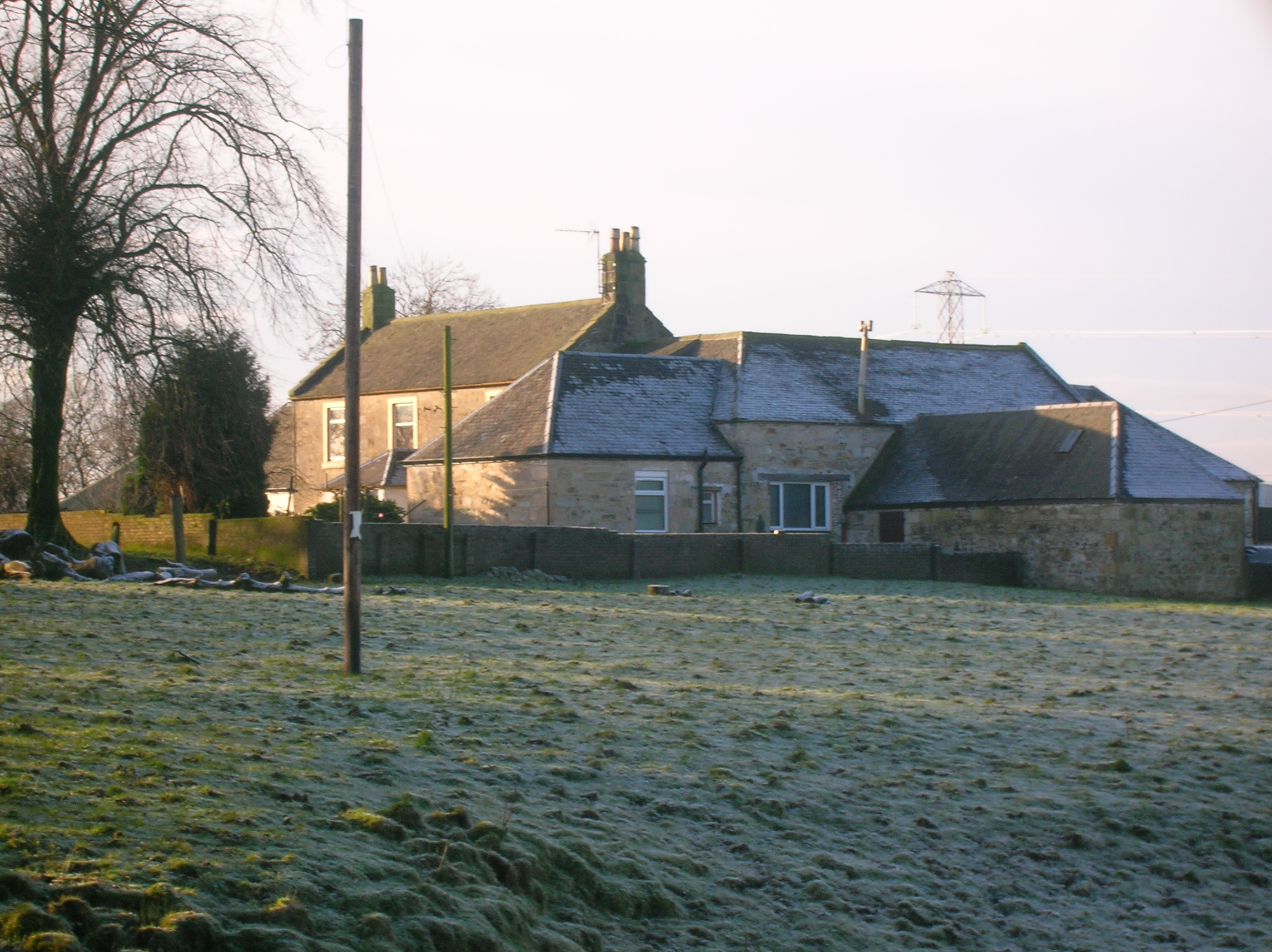
Roughwood Farm was once the caput of a barony within the Lordship of Giffen.

Records show that a William Giffen was appointed councillor in 1710 at Corsehill. Trearne house was used by a small boarding school called Gresham House until it was demolished in 1954.

The Lugton Ridges were part of the Barony of Giffen and one was also known as Deepstone.

The Dusk Water which powered Giffen Mill joins the River Garnock at Dalgarven and Cleeves Cove cave system is in the Dusk Glen, downstream of Giffen, near Cleeves farm.

The herb 'Dusky Cranesbill' is a rare garden escape. It grows in the vicinity of Thirdpart.

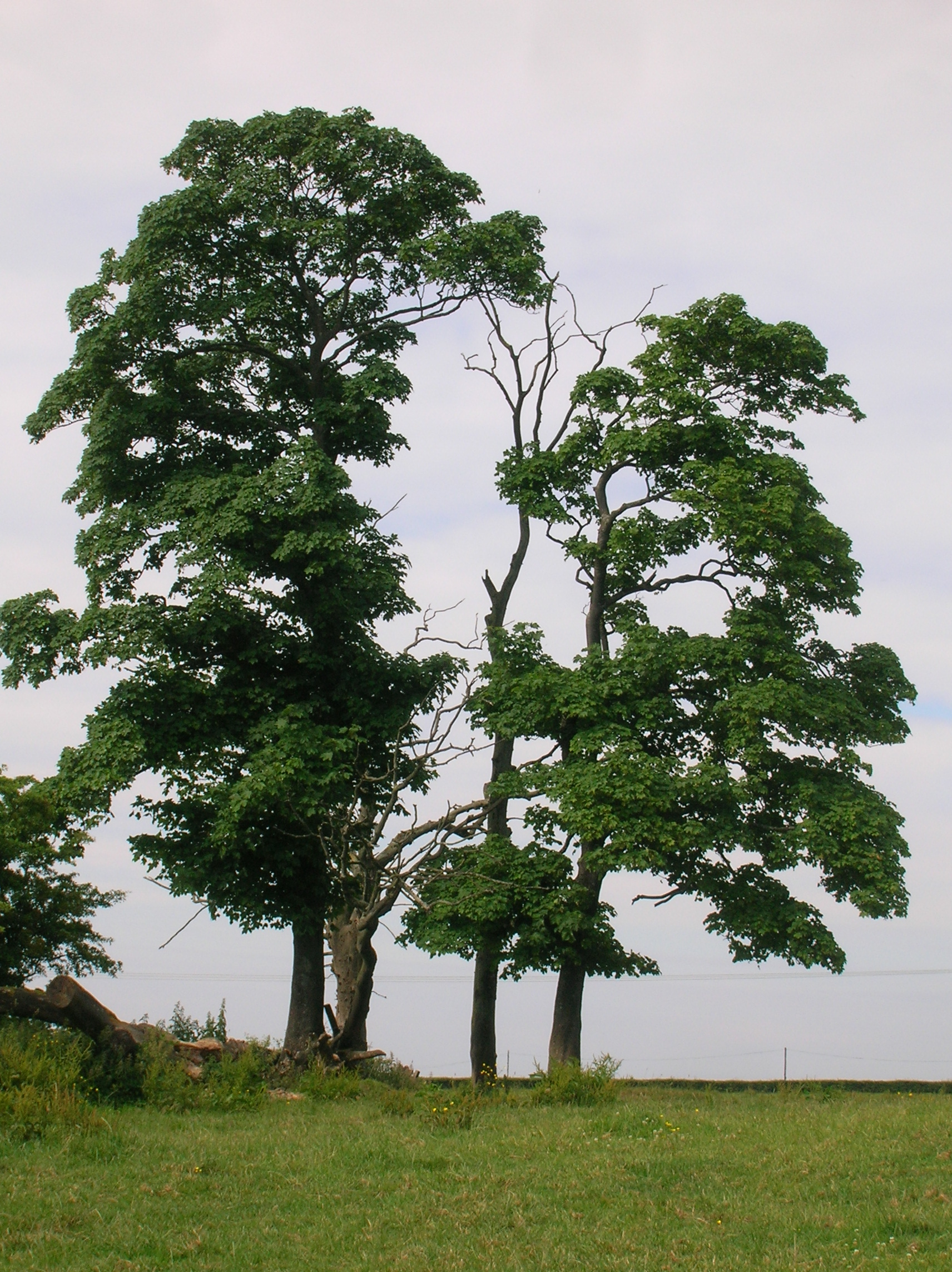
The site of the old Cholera pit below South Barr farm

In the 1830s 40 locals died from cholera and were buried in a triangular plot at the base of Jamesill Hill. The tradition is that the disease was passed on from a group of gipsies that local boys had gone out to meet.

William Patrick of Roughwood in 1855 employed the builder and mason Robert Snodgrass to construct the 'Barnweil Monument' near Ayr to the memory of William Wallace.

Mossend Farm survives as ruins in a copse next to a whinstone quarry across the lane from the old Dustyridge Farm.

== See also ==
- Lugton
- Clan Montgomery
- Eglinton Country Park The Earls of Eglinton.
- Gateside (Garnock)
