= Auchentiber =

Coordinates: 55.690°N 4.602°W

Auchentiber: Scottish Gaelic: Achadh an Tiobair
- Location within North Ayrshire
- OS grid reference: NS365471
- Council area: North Ayrshire
- Lieutenancy area: Ayrshire and Arran
- Country: Scotland
- Sovereign state: United Kingdom
- Post town: KILWINNING
- Postcode district: KA13
- Dialling code: 01294
- Police: Scotland
- Fire: Scottish
- Ambulance: Scottish
- UK Parliament: North Ayrshire and Arran
- Scottish Parliament: Cunninghame South

The hamlet of Auchentiber (Scottish Gaelic, Achadh an Tiobair, meaning field of the well) is in North Ayrshire, Parish of Kilwinning, Scotland. Auchentiber is four miles (six kilometres) northeast of Kilwinning on the Lochlibo Road, 2 1/4 mi (3.5 km) from the hamlet of Burnhouse and 2 1/2 mi (4 km) from the village of Barrmill. Grid Ref. NS3647. Some new housing has been built, but the settlement is still very much a hamlet. The settlement is on the Lugton Water, which runs into the River Garnock after running through Montgreenan and Eglinton Country Park in Irvine.

== Introduction ==
Auchentiber lies on the old toll roads from Ayr (15 mi or 24 km) to Glasgow (17 mi or 27 km), and Irvine to Glasgow with a junction for Kilwinning and a nearby country road leading to Bloak, Aiket Castle, Bonshaw, the Kilbrides and ultimately to Stewarton. The main part of the village is now on a "cul de sac", however previously lanes, footpaths and fords gave through routes to Fergushill Hall, the Stewarton road and back up to the Glasgow or "Lochlibo Road" via Bentfauld farm. A lane branches off at Bloak Road Bridge which runs via several farms, past Clonbeith and thence to Irvine via Sevenacres.

== History ==
Spelled "Auchintibber" in 1879, Ainslie's map of 1822 marks the site of the settlement with the modern spelling of "Auchentiber". The name "Achertybry" is marked on Pont's map of 1604, and another similar name, Achyntybers' is marked in the Parish of Stewarton as part of the "Barony of Balgray". The Stewarton area farms of this name are still extant and Pont states that the "Achin-Tybers" are the inheritance of the Earls of Cassillis. Armstrong's map of 1775, shows Auchentiber, Wardlaw and Redwells. Bloak is spelt 'Bloate'.

Etymology
The name Auchentiber, is thought to be derived, according to Pont, from 'the field of the well'. In Gaelic an 'Achin' is a 'fauld' or 'field' created from the clearance of 'wild' land and a 'Tiber' is a well or spring. See Knockentiber.

In 1550, Gavin Hamilton of Raploch, Abbot of Kilwinning Abbey granted the lands of 'Auchintiber' and 'Airthmaid' (Auchenmmade) to Gavin of Raploch, at an annual rent of 16 bolls of beir ('beir', 'bere' also 'bear' was the primitive indigenous form of one-sided barley. It gave a good yield on poor soils and its straw, used for thatching, was long and strong), 9 score 18 stones of cheese, and 7 stirks. This continued with Alexander Cunninghame, the commendator of the abbey in 1571 and third son of Alexander, fifth Earl of Glencairn. He was destined to be shot at his own gate on 1 August 1591 by Sir Robert Montgomerie of Skelmorlie, as part of the reprisals linked to the murder of the Earl of Eglinton, a Montgomery, at the Annick Ford on 18 April 1586.

In June 1590, Andrew Mure is recorded as being the heir to his late father John, in the 10s (Scots) lands of Over-Auchentiber in the Bailiary of Cuninghame, which he holds for the payment of 10 firlots and 2 pecks of oatmeal from the feudal lord. John Dene or Deyne is recorded on the same date as heir to his father John of the 20s (Scots) lands of Over-Auchentiber for 41 stone of cheese (petrae casei). On 4 October 1671, Janet and Agnes Murchland, are recorded as heirs of their grandfather, John Murchland in Cavan Miln (mill), in a part of the 40s (Scots) of Nether – Auchentiber.

In 1640 Hew Montgomerie is recorded as owning 'Over-Auchentyber', with John Dean and his mother, Andro (Sic) Mure and Robert Mure residing there. In 1876 the Auchentibers belonged to Robert Bruce Robertson Glasgow of Montgreenan, William Gemmell, Hugh Fleming, and Robert Fleming.

Steven lists John & Alexander Ferguson, Alexander Wylie and Robert Duncan in 1842 as owners of the "Auchentibers".

=== The Cleikum Inn ===
An Inn with this name is marked on the 1860 OS map on the right hand side of the road near Bentfauld farm. The 1895 does not name it as an inn, but does mark the inn at the position of the present day Blair Tavern; the 1925 OS marks the inn, but not the present day 'Blair Tavern'. The name Cleikum may be related to the 'Cleikum Inn' which features in Sir Walter Scott's novel 'St Ronan's Well', in which the 'Cleikum Club' met in the 'Cleikum Inn', so called from the sign-post showing the Saint catching the Devil. Meg Dods, landlady of the Cleikum Inn, is a formidable hostess, who runs a well organised hostelry with high standards of cleanliness and a distinct partiality regarding the social standing of her guests. This may explain why the name was taken up by many inns throughout the country. The name is derived from a unique ceremony the "Cleikum Celebrations". . . . According to the ancient story, St Ronan met the evil one and “cleekit him” well and truly by the "hint leg" and vanquished him with the only weapon to hand, the Cleikum Crook, a replica of which is carried by the "Patron Saint" during these celebrations at Innerleithen, near Edinburgh. A boy takes the part of the Patron Saint. A 'Cleik' in Scots is a metal pole from which a pot was hung to heat over a fire.

Mistress Dods was the landlady of the Cleikum Inn near Peebles which hosted the gatherings of the Cleikum Club. The aim of the club, which counted Sir Walter Scott among its members, was to celebrate our Scottish national literature. They certainly were among the first organisations to celebrate a Burns' Night. Mistress Dods was a superb cook and rigorous task-master. Staff ' and guests ' trembled before her! Her major publication 'The Cook's and Housewife's Manual' had the same iconic relationship to Scottish cuisine as that of Mrs Beaton to households south of the border. The name of the inn may reflect the popularity of Sir Walter Scott's novels at the time. The inn may have lost out to competition from the 'Blair Tavern' or to Burnhouse which had several inns at one time.

James Samuel Wyper was born on 24 October 1920, at Shettleston in Glasgow. When he was two years old he moved with his parents and sisters Violet, Margaret and Tilda to rural Auchentiber near Kilwinning in Ayrshire where their home was a former old coaching inn, the iron rings for tethering horses still embedded in the outer walls. James's sister Margaret remained at the Inn nursing both her parents until their death. She married her husband Duncan Hyslop at the nearby Benslie Parish Church and her daughter Margaret was born in the house. When her brother James sold the house Margaret and her family moved to Uplawmoor. A lay-by now exists at the site of the Cleikum Inn.

Jamieson records that the inn at Burnhouse was nicknames the 'Trap 'Em Inn', the one at Lugton was called the 'Lug 'Em Inn', that at Auchentiber the 'Cleek 'Em Inn', and finally the one at Torranyard was called the 'Turn 'Em Out.'

=== The local schools ===
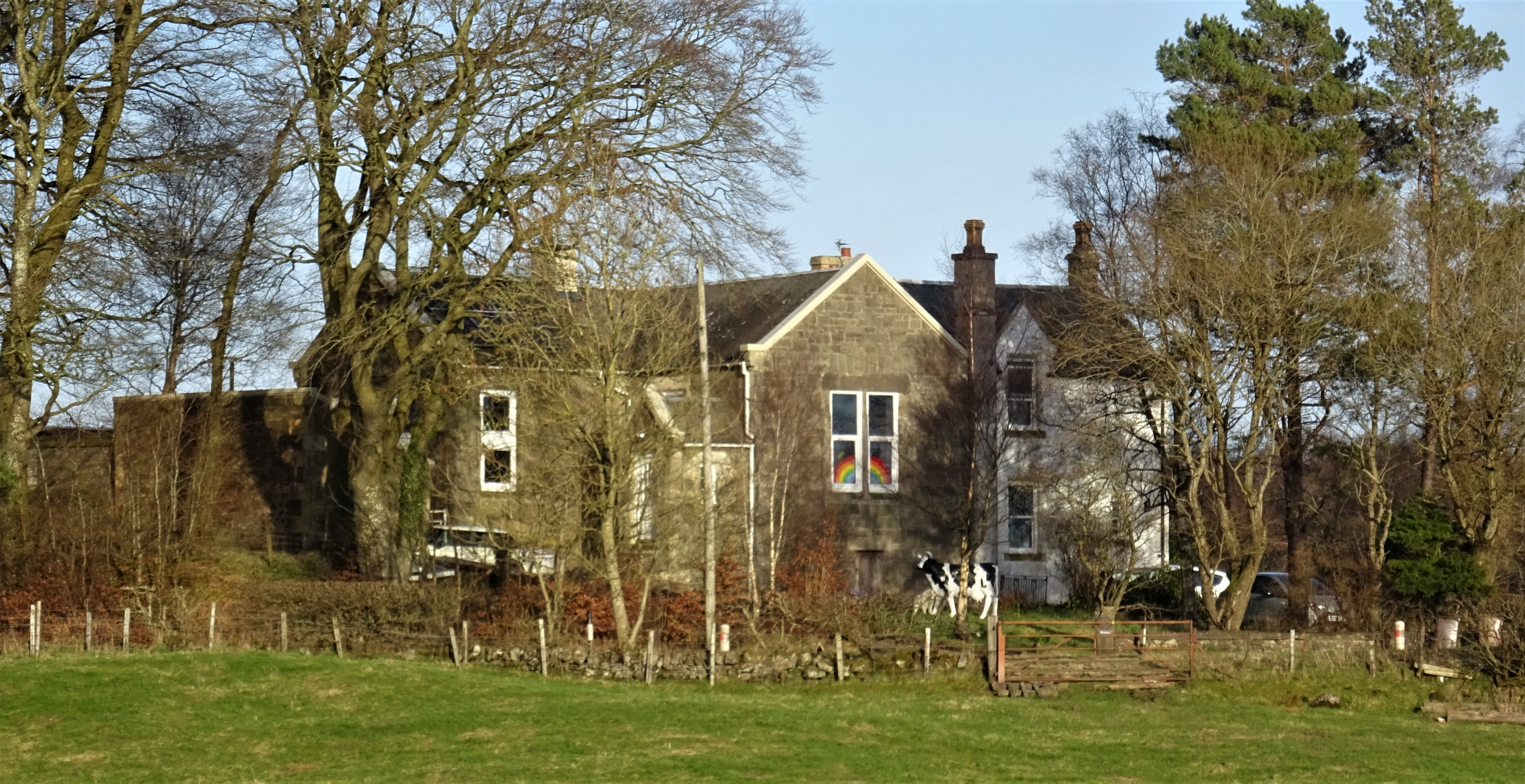
The old Auchentiber School.

In 1860 a school is shown on the OS map in the hamlet, but by 1879 it was moved to the other side of the Lugton Water, with accommodation for 110 children, and an average attendance of 50, and with a grant of £45 11s 0d. In 1881 the attendance was 73 pupils. A new Auchentiber school was built near the Bloak Road bridge and closed in 1954. The building survives as a private house. A small school was also located for many years at the nearby hamlet of Bloak.

=== The Blair Tavern ===
The 'Blair Tavern' is a prominent group of buildings, but it was not opened as a public house until the late 20th century, although the buildings are marked on the 1860 OS map and may be even older. The date 1834 in Roman numerals is above the entrance door of the tavern.

In the 1960s it was a garage, the Blair Garage, and prior to that it may have had some link with the Fergushill Hall. It was renovated in 2008–2009 and is now known as the 'Blair'.

=== Local place names ===
The main road through the hamlet was not in existence in 1745, but when first built it is recorded as "Lochlibo Road". "Bloak Road Bridge" is the one near the entrance to Greenlea (previously Greenlee). Mosside was the farm near the Glasgow 20-mile (32-kilometre) and Irvine 5 1/4-mile (8.4-kilometre) milestones, now a ruin. Meg'swa's' is Megswells and is on the road to Irvine via Clonbeith, mentioned in the story Lady in the Peat. "Todholes" was a ruin as far back as 1860 and lay close to a small quarry on the Auchentiber moss side of the Kilwinning Road. "Waukmill" was a group of buildings near the ford off the old lane that came out on to the Stewarton road beyond Wardlaw farm. Satellite imagery shows up the course of the old waulkmill lade which came off the Lugton Water to power the waterwheel and returned just below the old ford. Twyford Cottage seems to be named after the ford which lay between it and the road to Wardlaw and Bloak.

=== Fergushill Hall ===
A number of properties in the surrounding area have the appellation Fergushill, such as at Knockentiber; North & South Fergushills near Eglinton, also Hill and Hall of Fergushill at Auchentiber. A lane ran to Fergushill Hall from the buildings in Auchentiber which now form the Blair Tavern. This lane only exists in part as of 2007.

Robert Fergushill of Fergushill had a crown charter in 1633 of the lands of Middle Auchentiber. He was the last of the lairds and the Craufurds of Craufurdland appear to have inherited. He had married Marion Porterfield, daughter of Alexander Porterfield younger of that Ilk.

== Mineral wells and the source of the Chapel Burn ==
Paterson (1866) states that there is a mineral spring near Stewarton, called the Bloak Well. Robinson gives the Scot's word 'blout' as meaning the 'eruption of fluid' or a place that is soft or wet. Both meanings would fit in this context. Blout and Bloak are very similar words, with a Bloak Moss not very far.

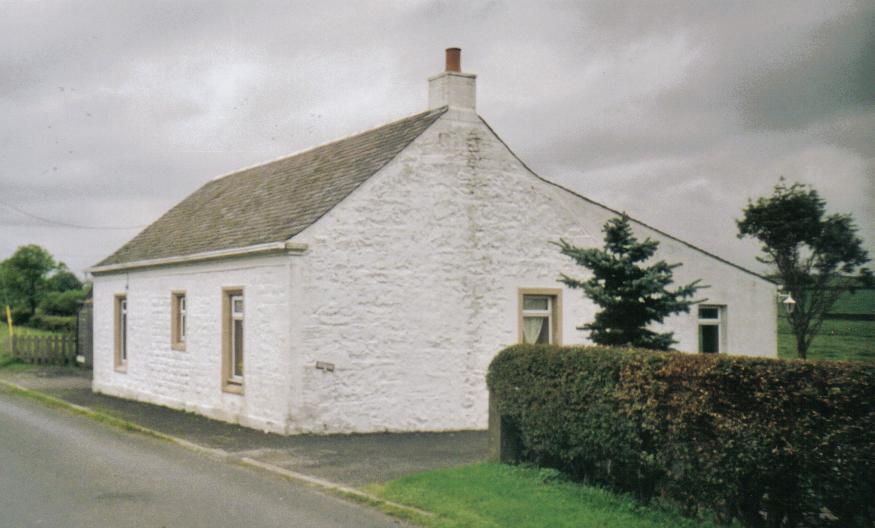
A view of Bloak Well, now called Saltwells, in 2024.

A well recorded as Bloak Well was first discovered in 1800, around 1826 or 1810, by the fact that pigeons from Lainshaw House and the neighbouring parishes flocked here to drink.

Mr. Cunningham of Lainshaw built a handsome house over the well in 1833 and appointed a keeper to take care of it as the mineral water was of some value owing to healing properties attributed to it. The well was located in the middle of the kitchen. This is now known as 'Saltwells Cottage', lying next to the Glazert.

=== Quarries and limekilns ===
Near Waukmill the 1860 OS shows whinstone, limestone and sandstone quarries and a limekiln. On the Kilwinning road is marked the Ward whinstone quarry.

Etymology
The name Auchenmade (previously Achin-Medds), is thought to be derived, according to Pont, from either 'the field of sticks or timber'. In Gaelic this is Achadh-na-maid. Madadh is a wolf, dog or fox and this is another possibility.

On the lane down to East Auchenmade are other freestone and limestone quarries and limekilns. Another whinstone quarry and limekiln was on the road up to Wardlaw. Waukmill no longer exists A weir existed on the Lugton Water nearby and this may have been connected with a waulkmill, one that treated wool to make it suitable for producing cloth for clothing.

=== Views of Auchenmade claypit and brickworks – 2008 ===
A brickworks was situated at the Auchenmade claypit, close to South Auchenmade farm. It was served by the Caledonian Railway line that ran from Glasgow to Ardrossan via Lissens. the brickworks is marked on the 1896 OS map with its railway siding, however by 1911 the siding is no longer shown and although marked, the brickworks may no longer be working.

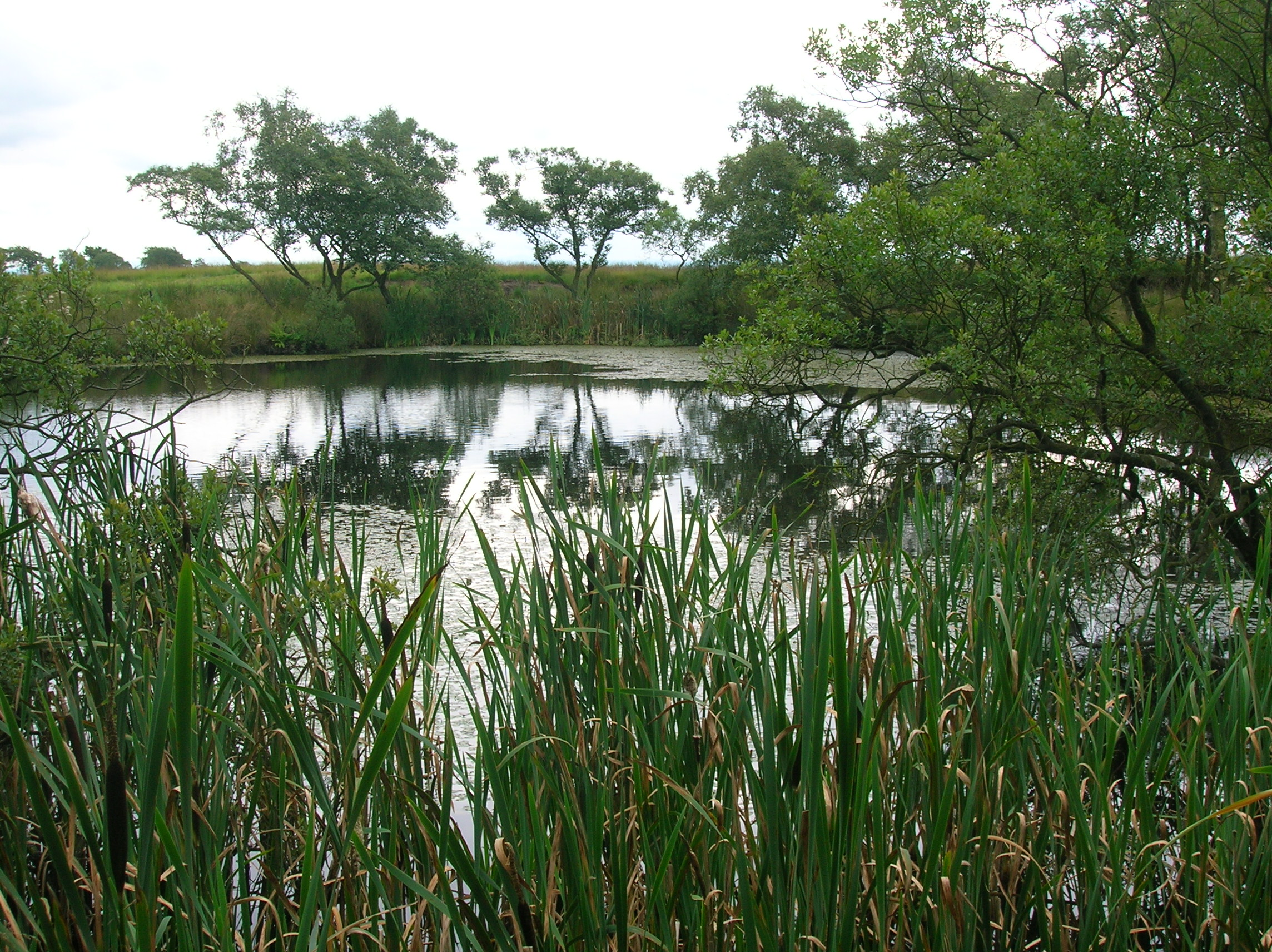
The flooded Auchenmade claypit.

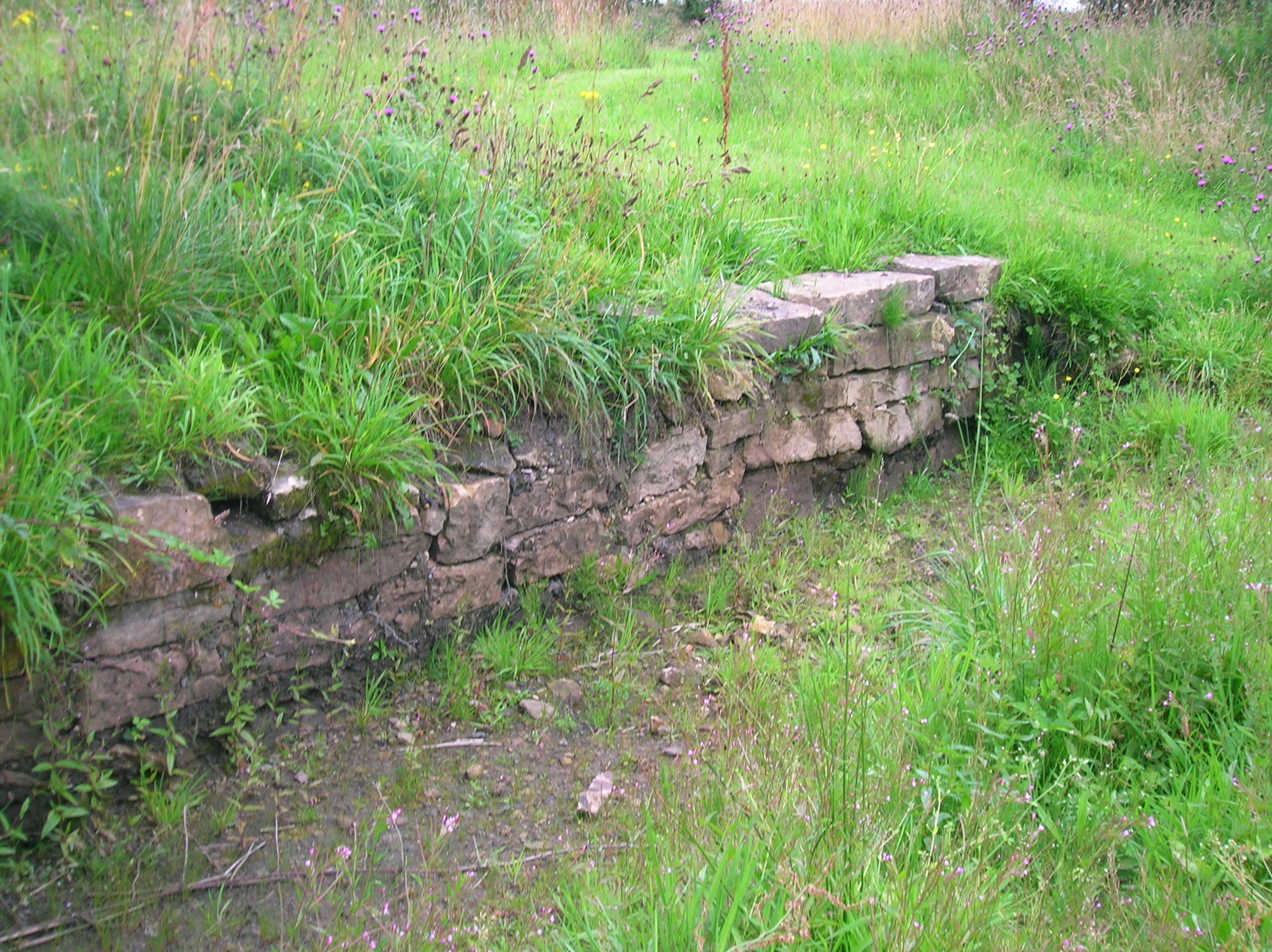
The railway loading dock for coal inwards and bricks outwards.

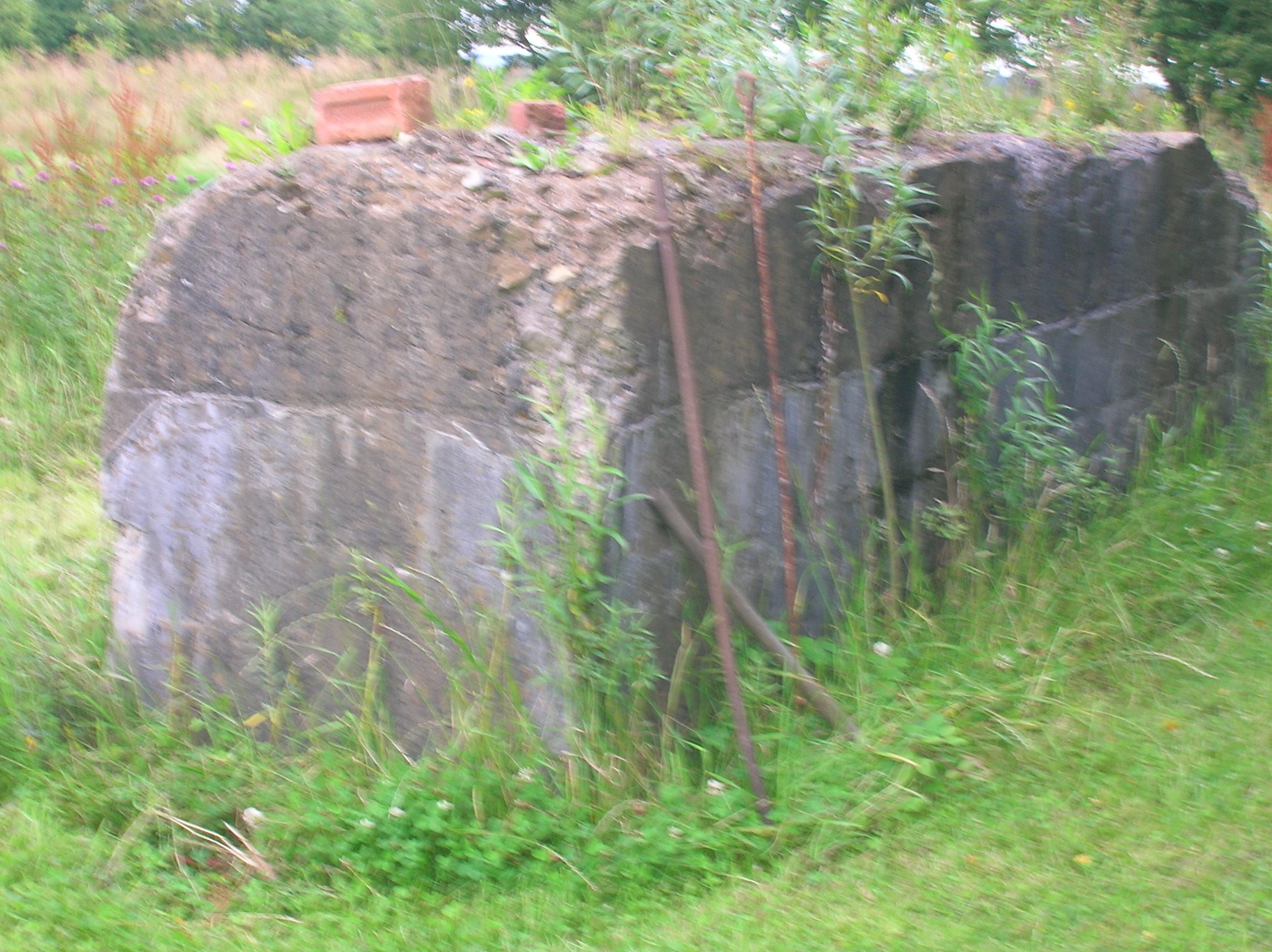
Concrete plinth for heavy machinery. A quarry drill is leaning against it.

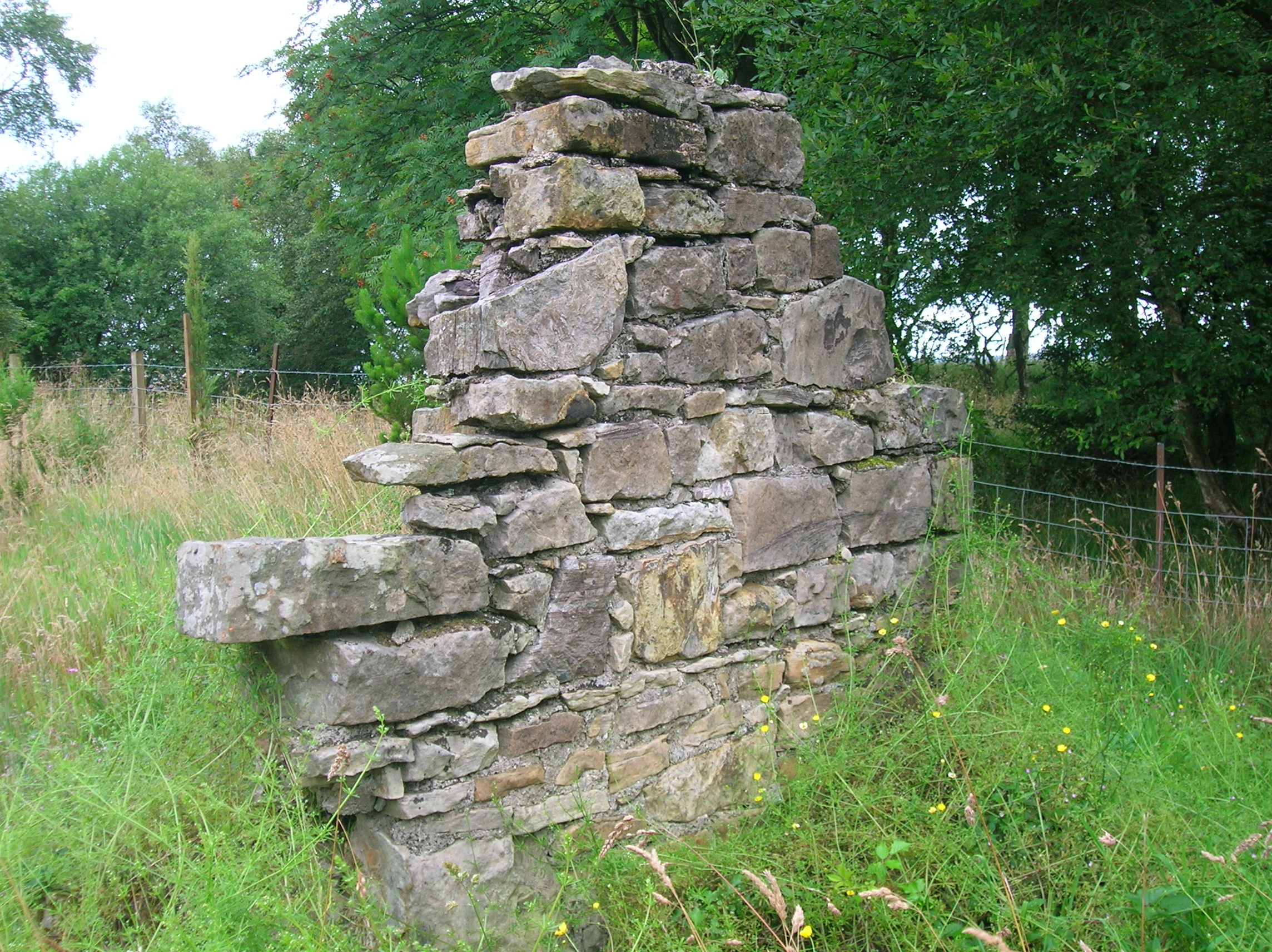
A gable end of the old brickworks office.

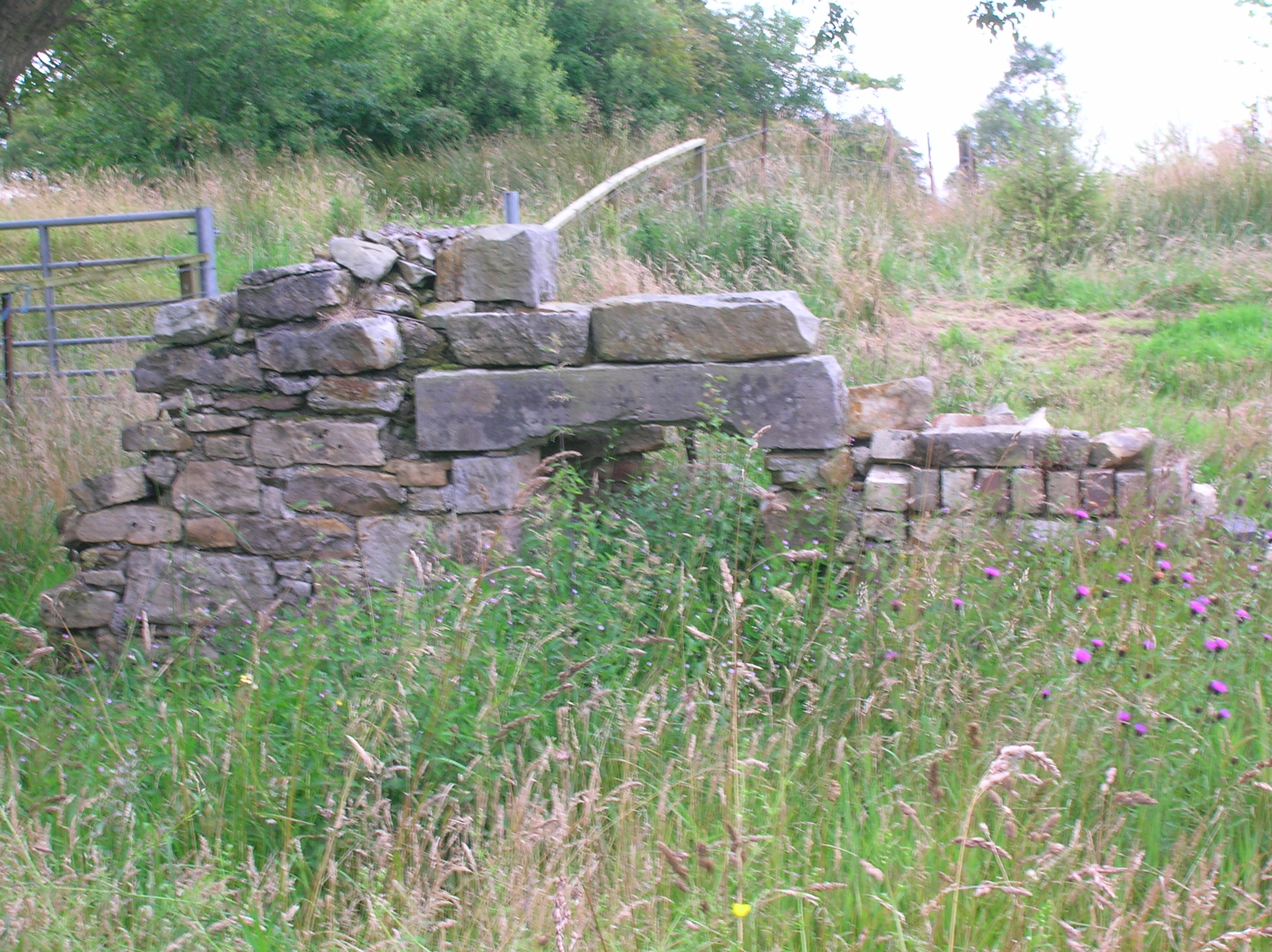
Gable end and the fireplace of the office.

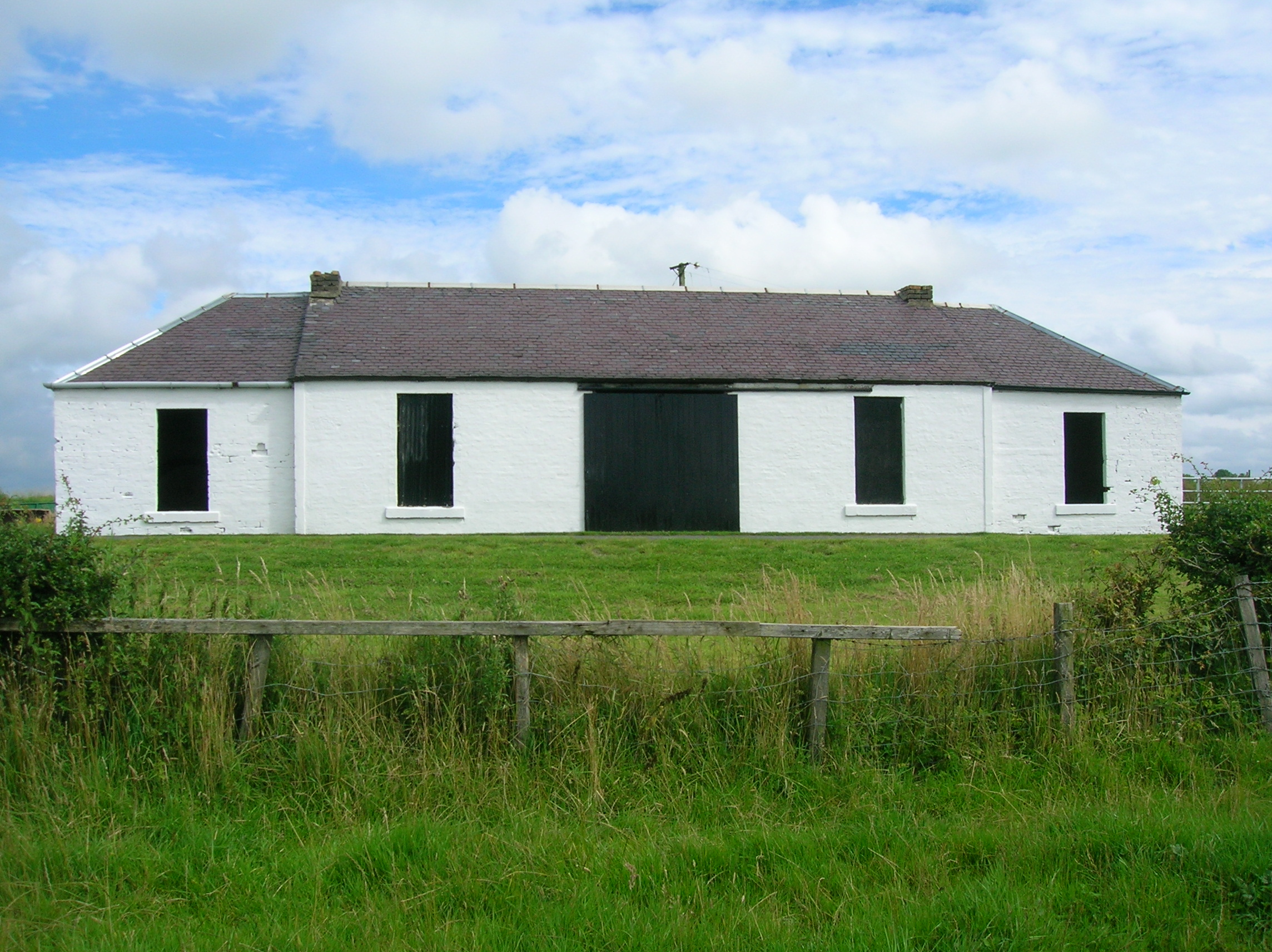
What may have been the brickworks manager's house.

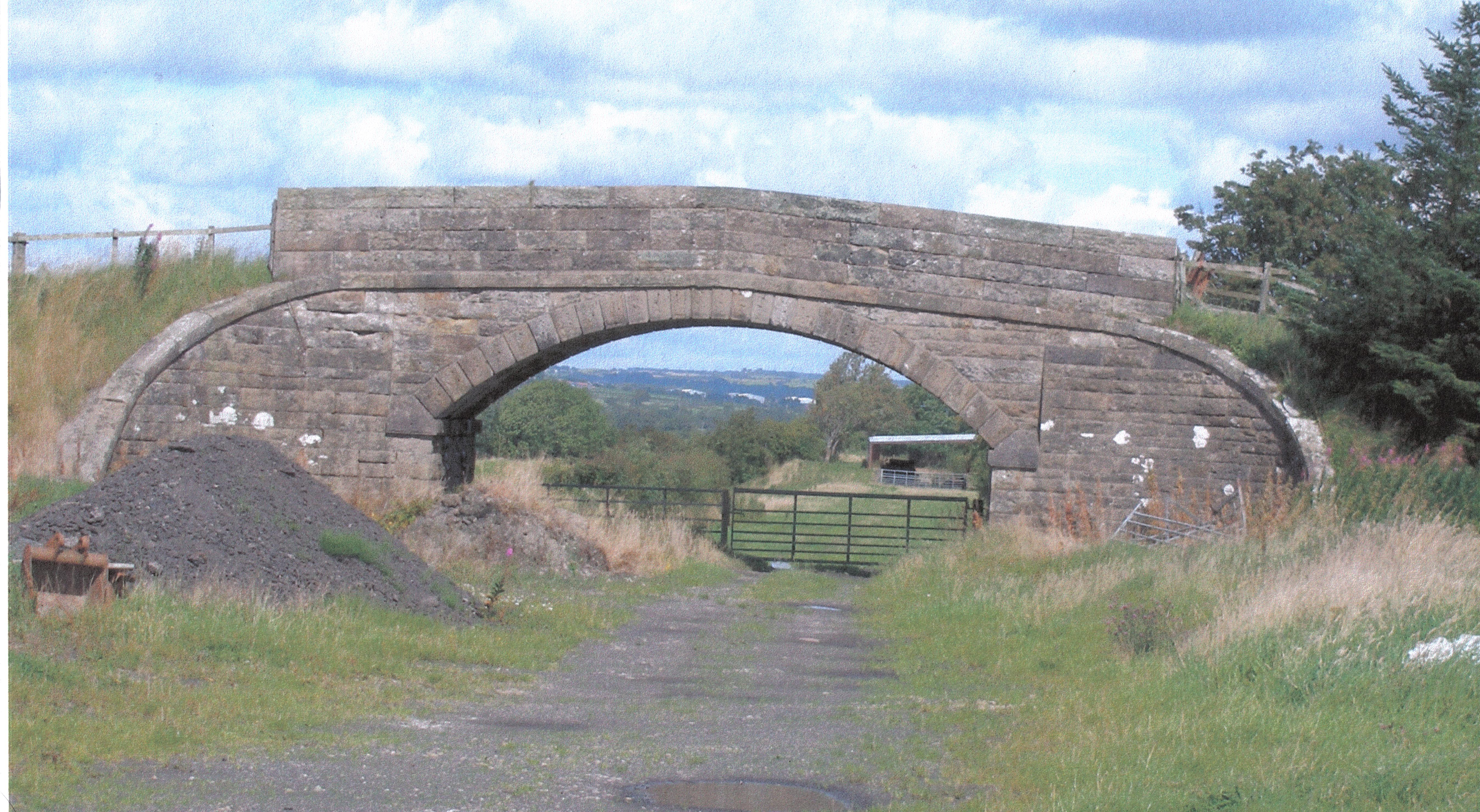
The overbridge at South Auchenmade Farm with the old Auchenmade station in the background.

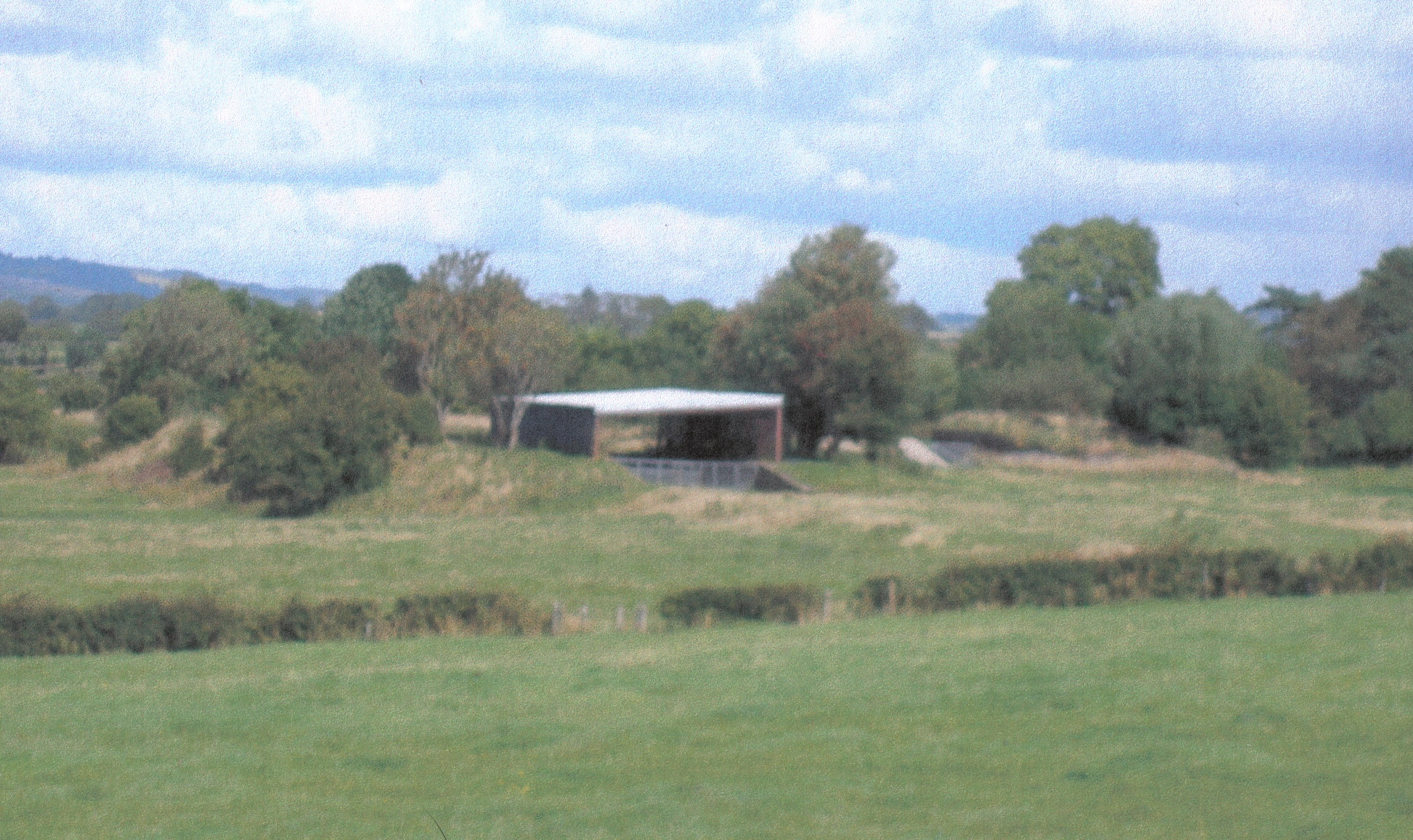
Auchenmade station from South Auchenmade Farm in 2008.

=== The mosses ===
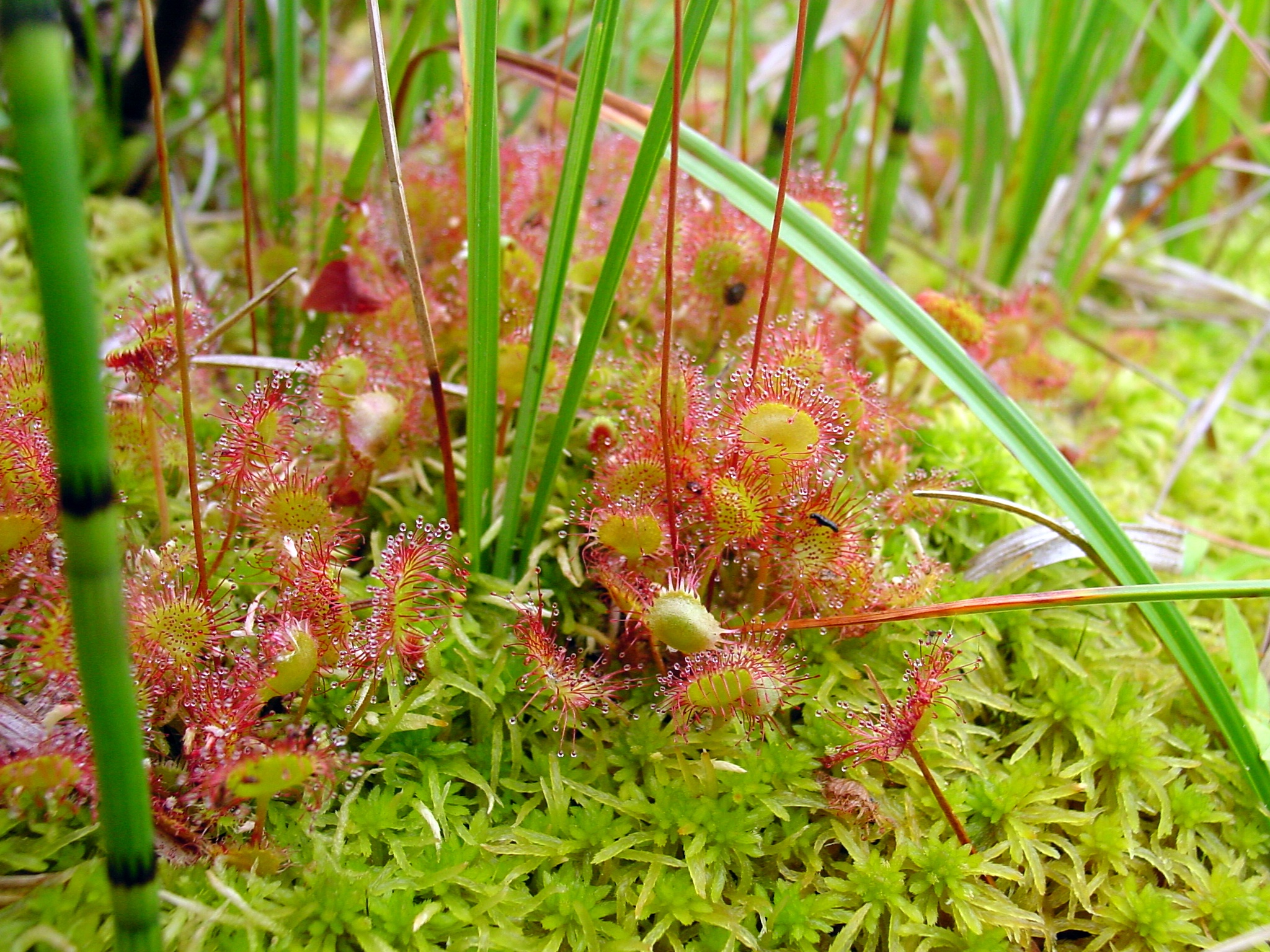
Round-leaf sundew (D. rotundifolia) growing in sphagnum moss.

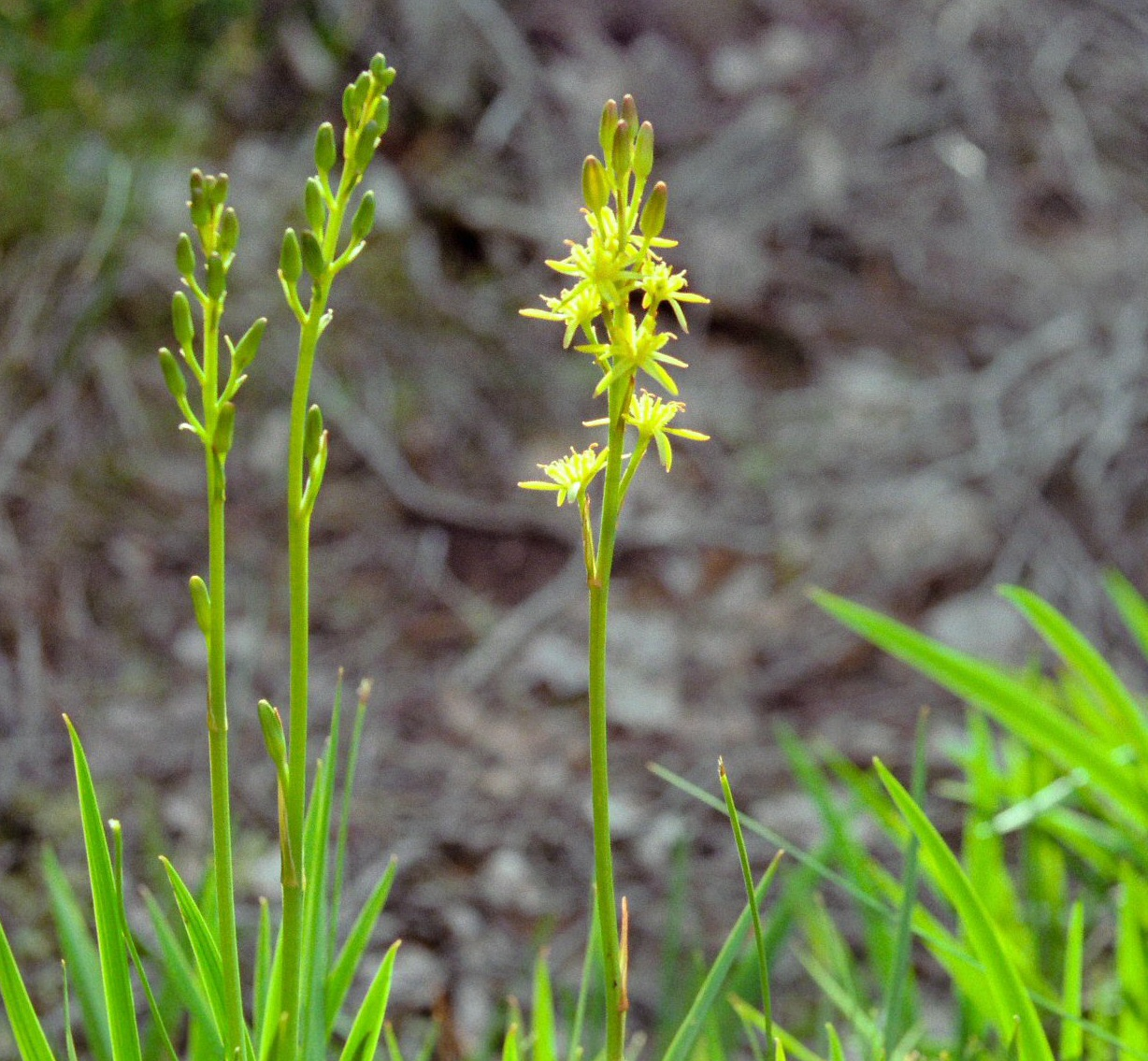
Bog asphodel

This low-lying area is dominated by Bloak, Lissens, Sidehead, Kennox, Auchentiber, Over Auchentiber, Auchentiber South, Auchentiber West, Dykeneuk, Dykeneuk South, South Auchenmade and Cockinhead mosses. These are more correctly called 'raised bogs' or 'mires' and are a very rare habitat in lowland Scotland; around 90% having been drained or otherwise degraded beyond any possible restoration. Auchentiber Moss is partly wooded with mainly birch trees and the remains of pheasant rearing cages are noticeable. Hummocks or 'heads' of moss are an unusual feature of the wooded part of this moss. Moorgrips or ditches are frequent on the moss and the walker had better beware. Cockinhead is unusually well preserved and is a Site of Special Scientific Interest (SSSI), protected by the Scottish Natural Heritage (SNH) organisation. Burns from some of these (Auchentiber, Sidehead and Brummel) run through the hamlet on their way to join the Lugton Water.

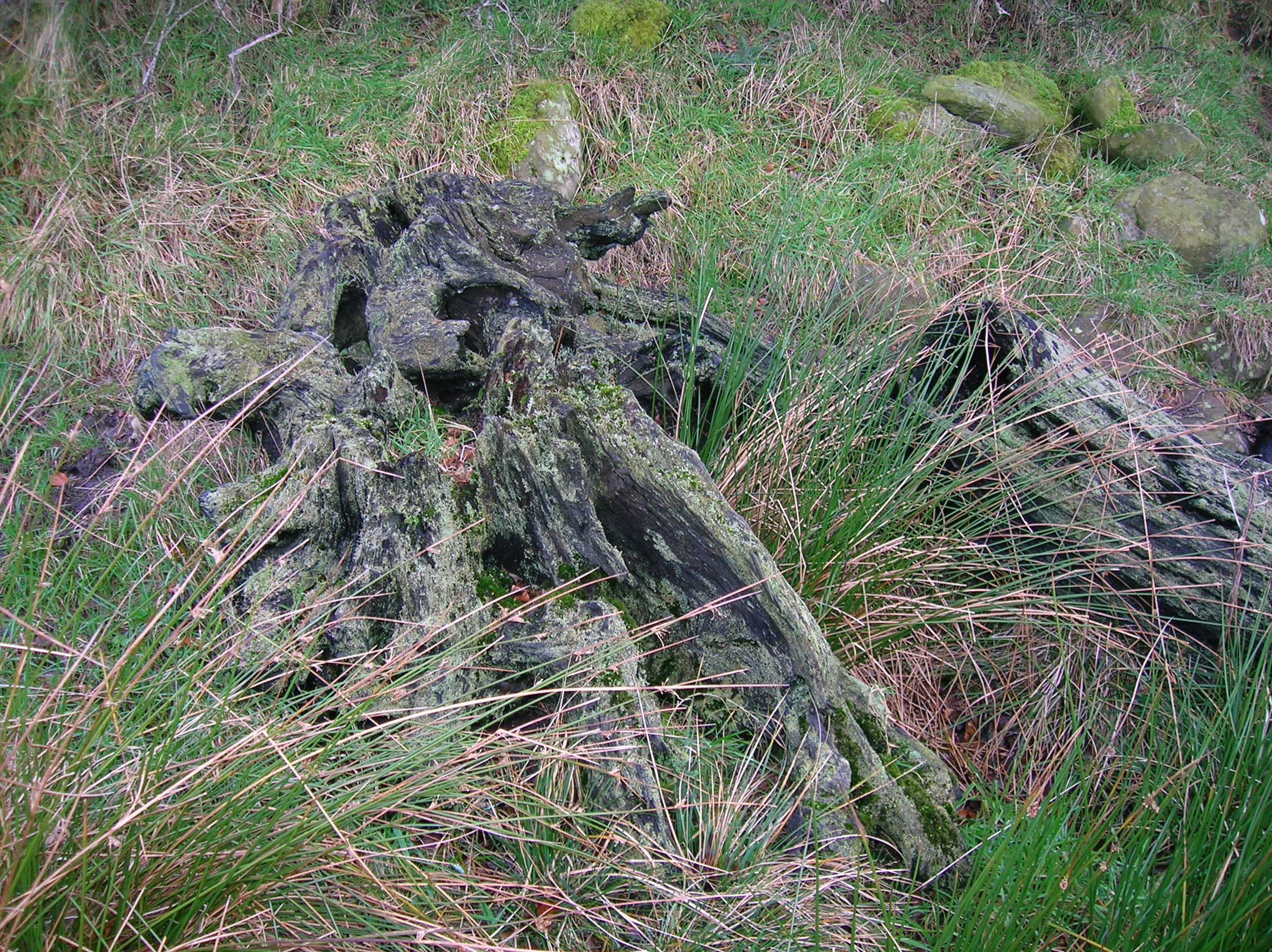
Bog wood at Stumpy Knowe near South Auchenmade.

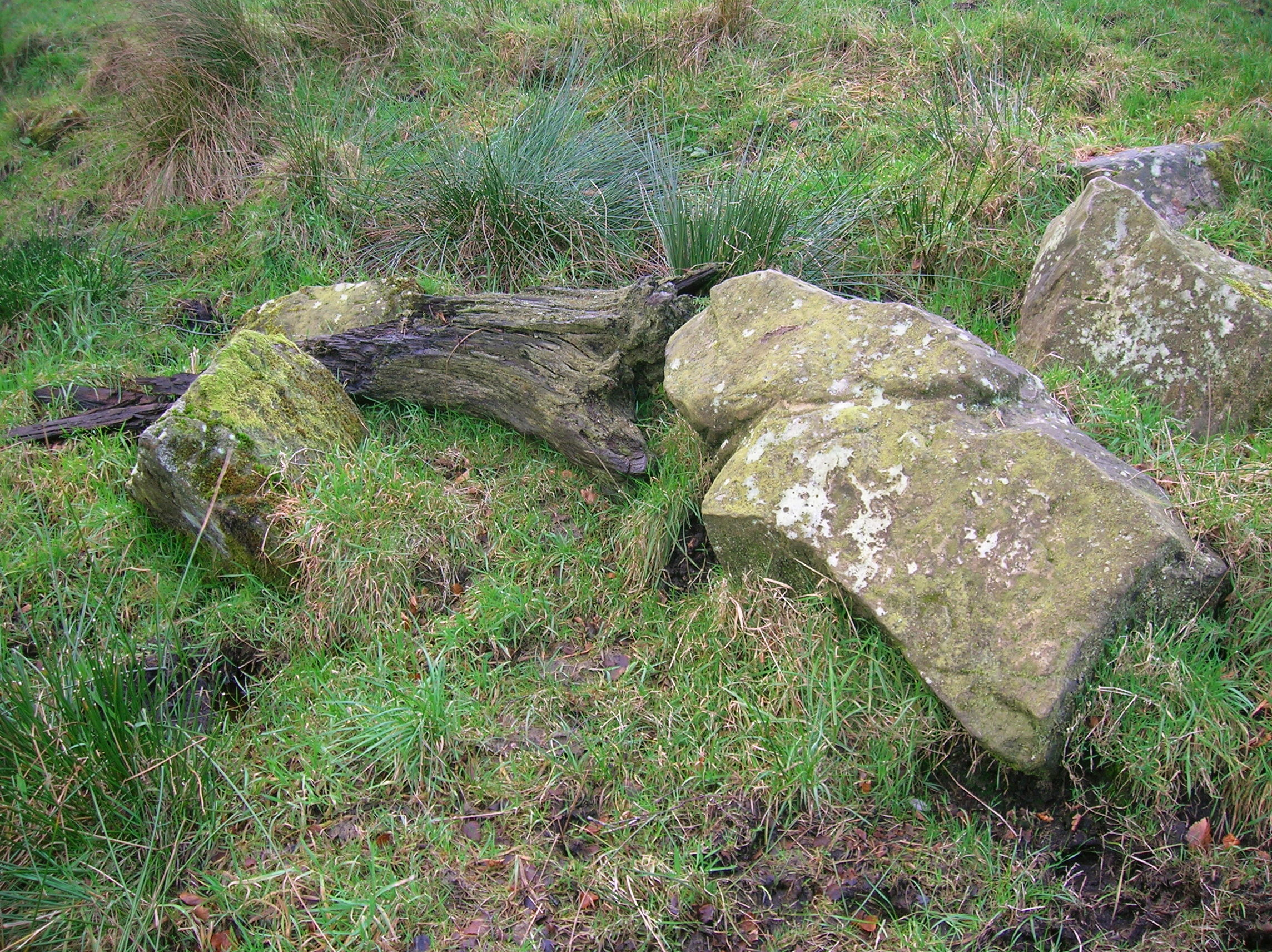
Bog wood and boulders at the Stumpy Knowe near South Auchenmade; a possible man-made mound lying above the surrounding old raised bogs.

Typical plants of these mosses are cottongrasses, ling heather, bell heather, cranberry, blaeberry, bog rosemary, sundews, deer grass, crowberry, etc. Mr. Kerr, the Montgreenan Estate forester in 1915 described to the Kilmarnock Glenfield Ramblers how afforestation was being tried on Auchentiber Moss by his employer, Sir James Bell. During WW1 many woods were cut to provide timber for the war effort and plantings took place to provide for future needs.

The part of Auchentiber Moss that was successfully planted circa 1915 now has a good number of large, uniformly aged Scots pines that have greatly contributed to the drying out of the moss in those areas. The pines are also successfully spreading out into the open areas of the moss and will eventually degrade the site unless these trees, as well as the silver birch, are removed. The North Ayrshire Ranger Service carried out a detailed survey of the Auchentiber and other mosses in 2008.

A certain amount of peat cutting has taken place, especially beside the road to Sevencares and Kilwinning. Historically the Auchentiber and Dykneuk mosses were one continuous moss, as were Bloak and Kennox.

Dr. Duguid visited Bonshaw, the home of the collector Alexander Reid, circa the 1840s and lists some of the items in Reid's collection, including garden seats made of bog-oak from Auchentiber Moss. In the 1840s during peat cutting at Auchentiber a straight row of wooden stakes was discovered under the peat, which was then between 10 and 12 feet thick.

=== Views in Auchentiber and Bloak Moss ===
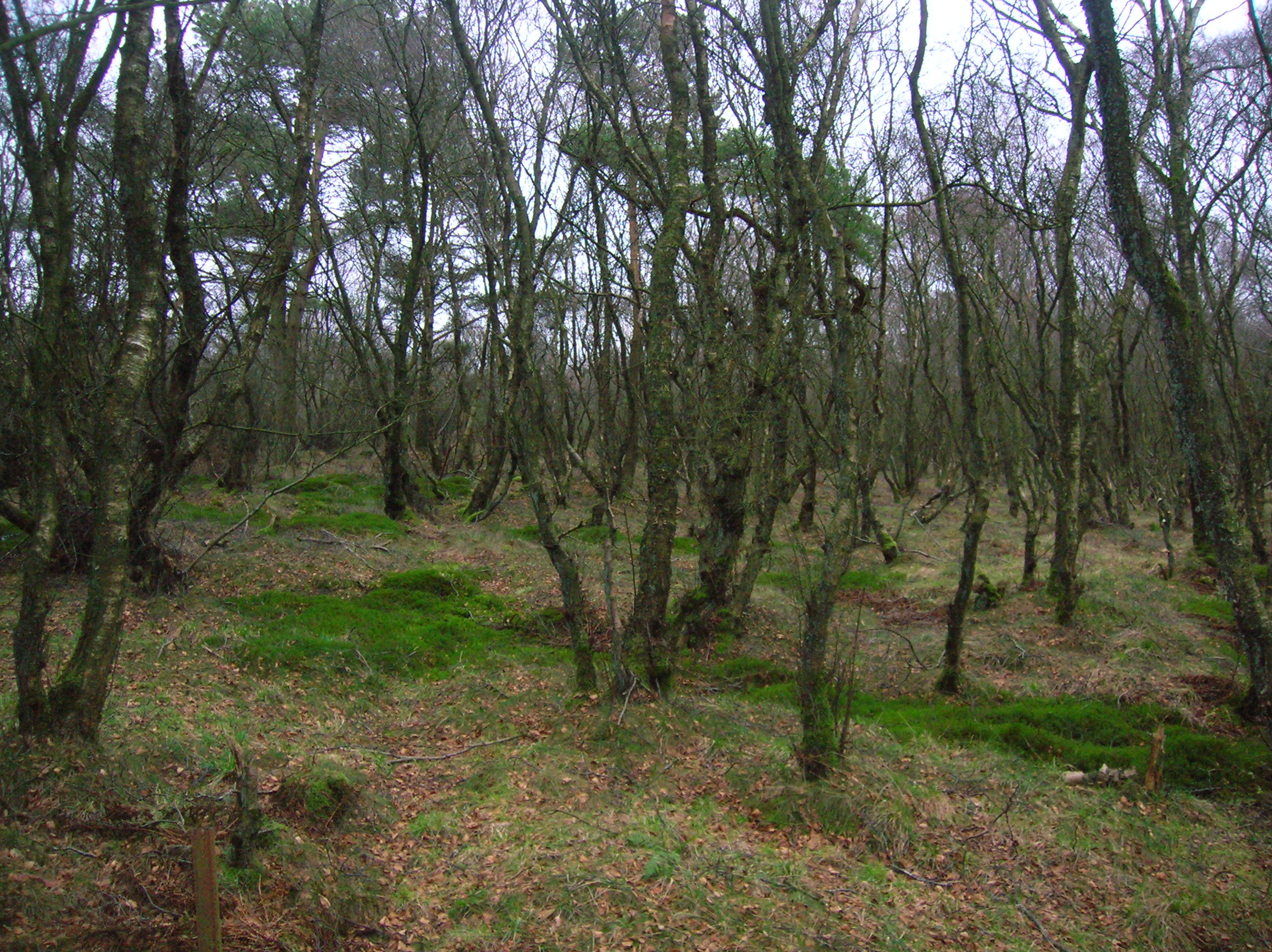
Silver birch and Scots pine woodland bordering Auchentiber moss.

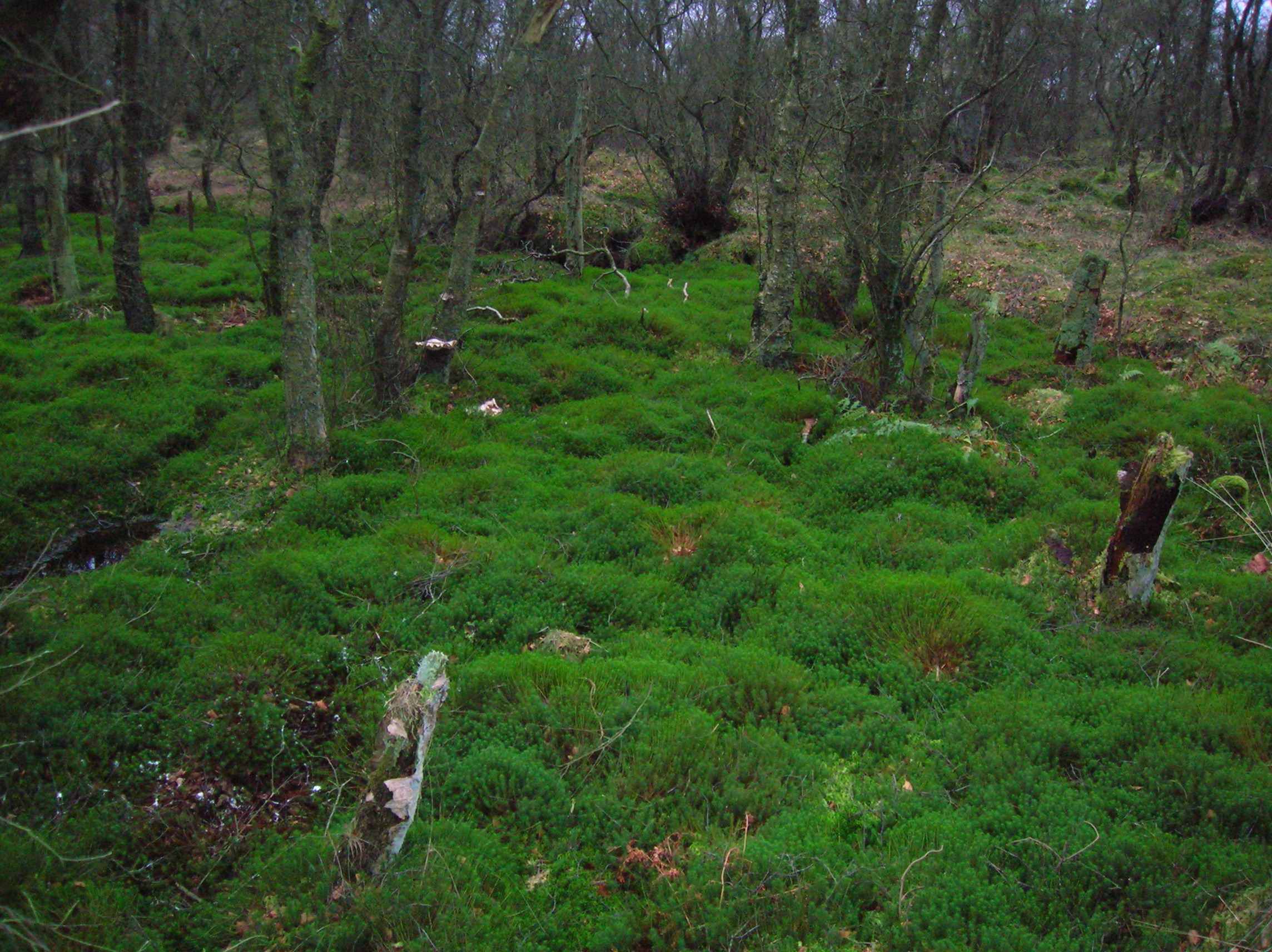
Areas of ground flora are dominated by Polytrichum, the hair moss.

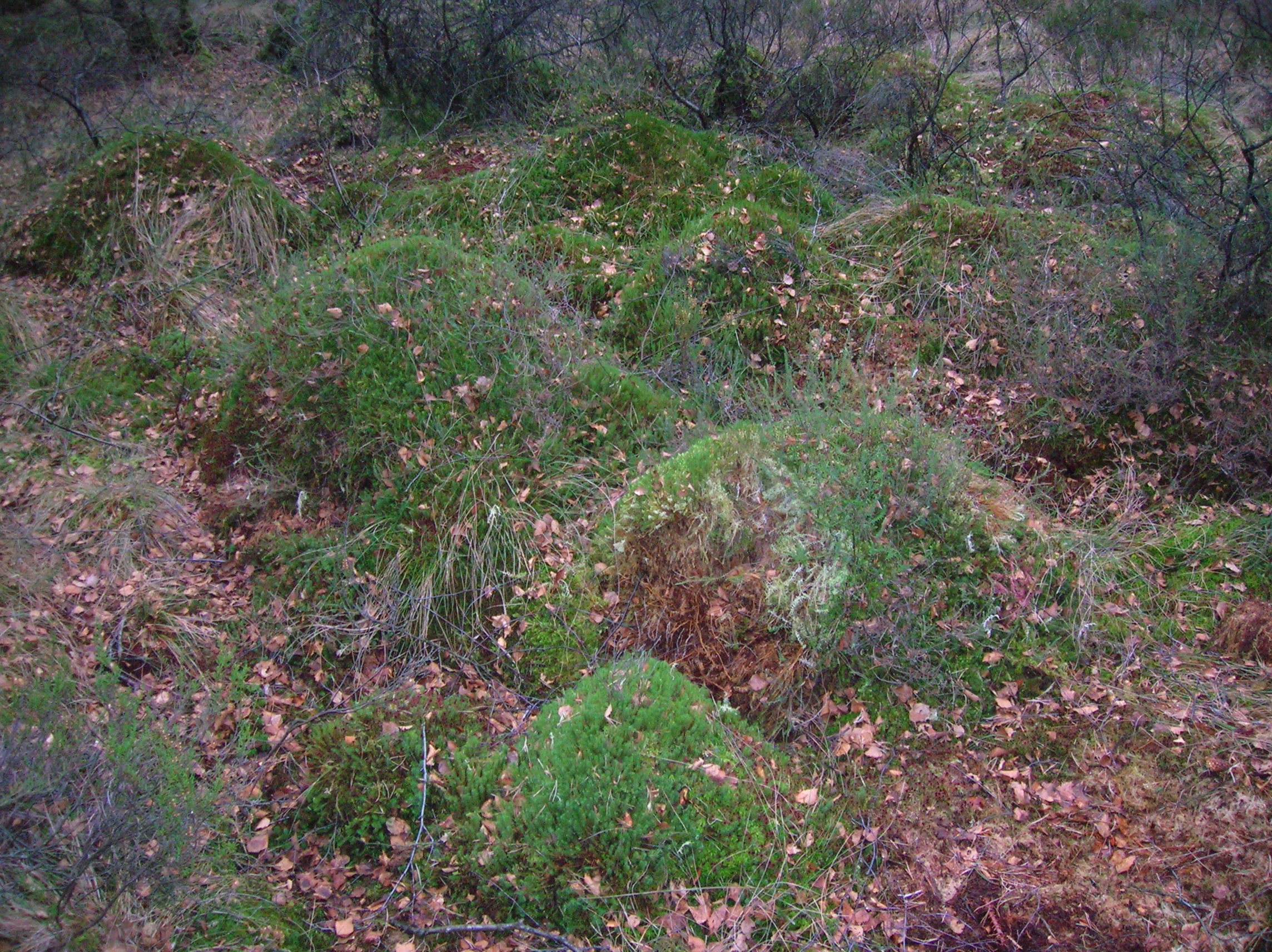
Unusual Auchentiber 'mossheads' in this rare lowland raised bog habitat.

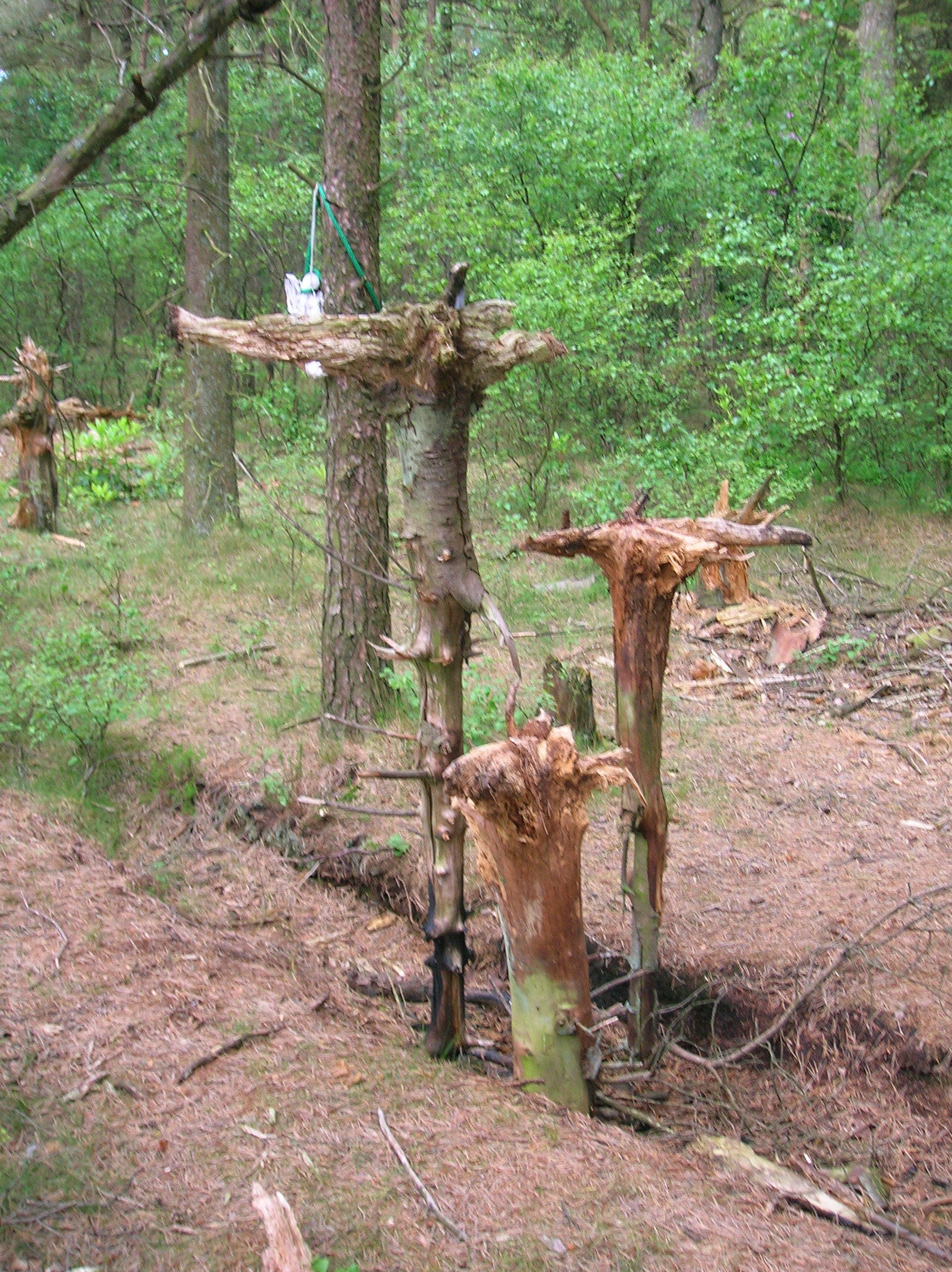
Environmental art in Bloak Moss Woods

=== Railway ===
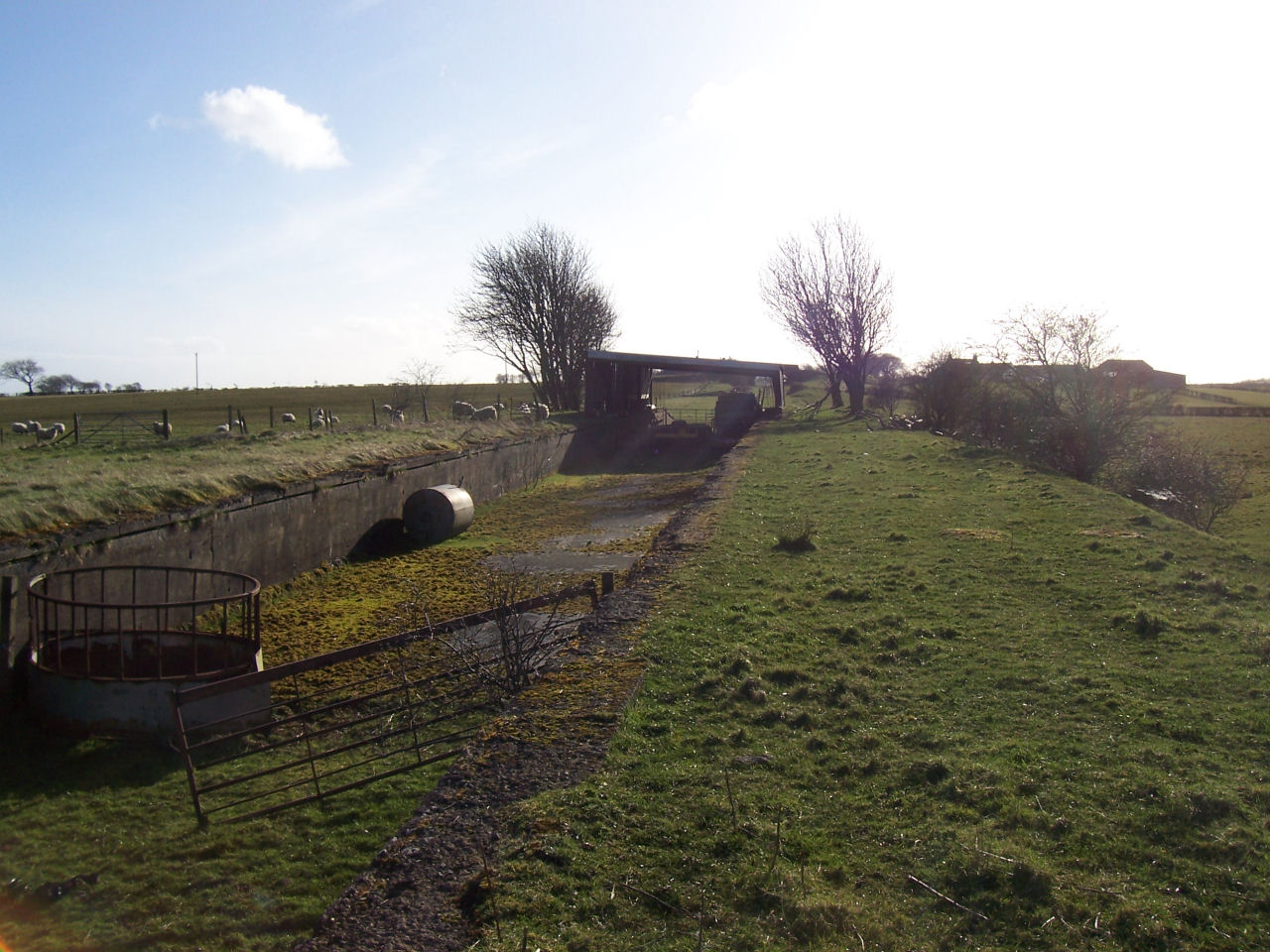
Auchenmade station platforms.

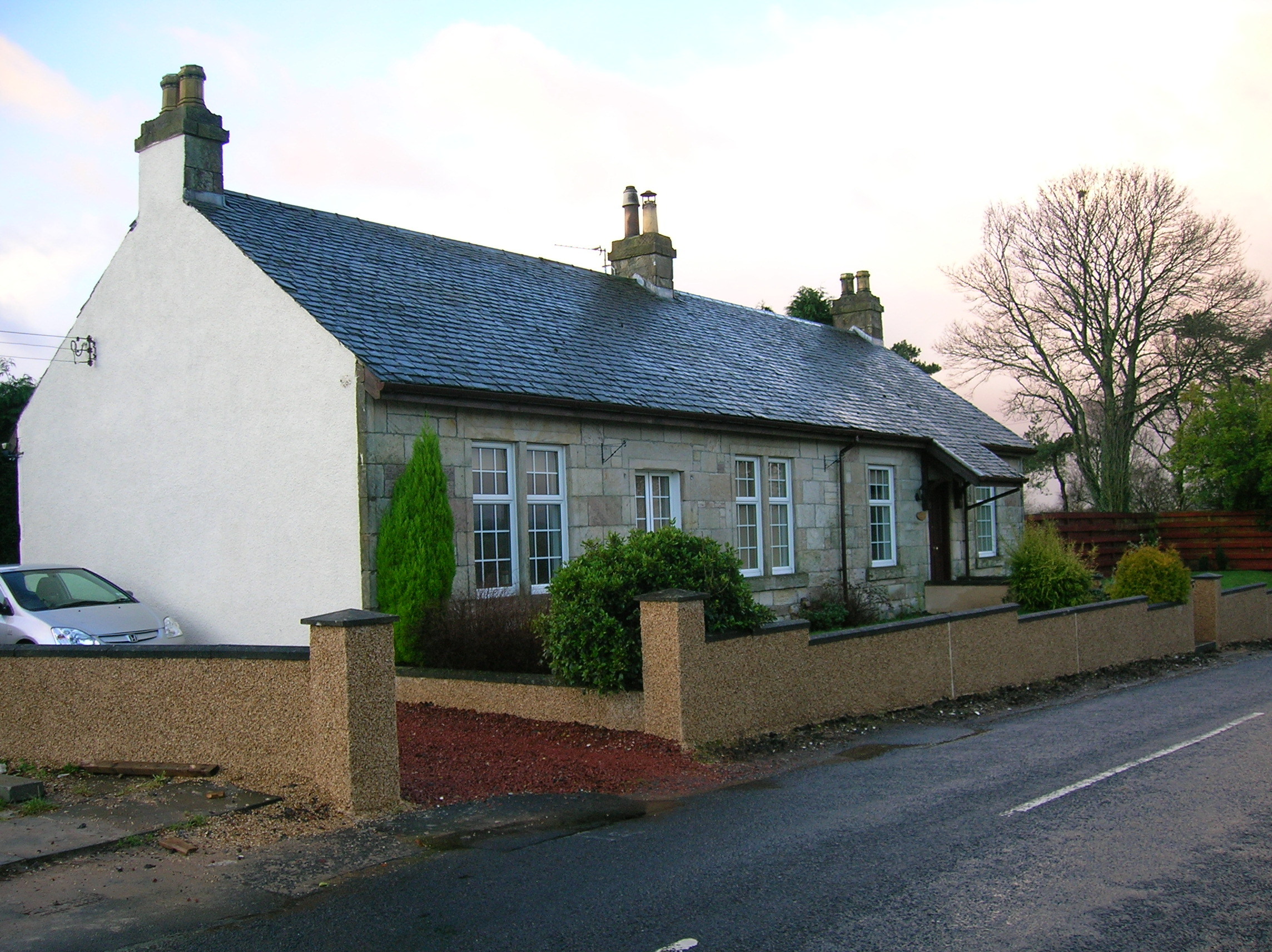
Old railway workers cottage at Auchenmade.

Auchenmade railway station was nearby and was originally part of the Lanarkshire and Ayrshire Railway. It opened on 3 September 1888. It closed between 1 January 1917 and 2 March 1919 due to wartime economy, and closed permanently on 4 July 1932. Lissens Goods station may also have served the village as a freight facility.

=== Turnpike ===
Auchentiber was on a toll road or turnpike; the nearest milestone being at the crossroads and the nearest tolls were at Torranyard and Lugton. The name turnpike originated from the original 'gate' used being just a simple wooden bar attached at one end to a hinge on the supporting post. The hinge allowed it to 'open' or 'turn' This bar looked like the 'pike' used as a weapon in the army at that time and therefore we get 'turnpike'. The term was also used by the military for barriers set up on roads specifically to prevent the passage of horses. In addition to providing better surfaces and more direct routes, the turnpikes settled the confusion of the different lengths given to miles, which varied from 4,854 ft (1,479 m) to nearly 7,000 ft (2,100 m). Long miles, short miles, Scotch or Scot's miles (5,928 ft or 1,807 m), Irish miles (6,720 ft or 2,050 m), etc. all existed. 5,280 feet (1,610 m) seems to have been an average. Another important point is that when these new toll roads were constructed the turnpike trusts went to a great deal of trouble to improve the route of the new road and these changes could be quite considerable as the old roads tended to go from farm to farm, hardly the shortest route. The tolls on roads were abolished in 1878 to be replaced by a road 'assessment', which was taken over by the County Council in 1889.

Etymology
Auchenharvie, according to Pont is derived from the 'Low hill or 'Knoppe' in a field of yellow corn.

Most milestones are no longer in situ and often the only remaining clue is an otherwise unexplained 'kink' in the line of a hedgerow. The milestones were buried during the Second World War so as not to provide assistance to invading troops, German spies, etc. This seems to have happened all over Scotland, however Fife was more fortunate than Ayrshire, for the stones were taken into storage and put back in place after the war had finished.

=== Farms ===
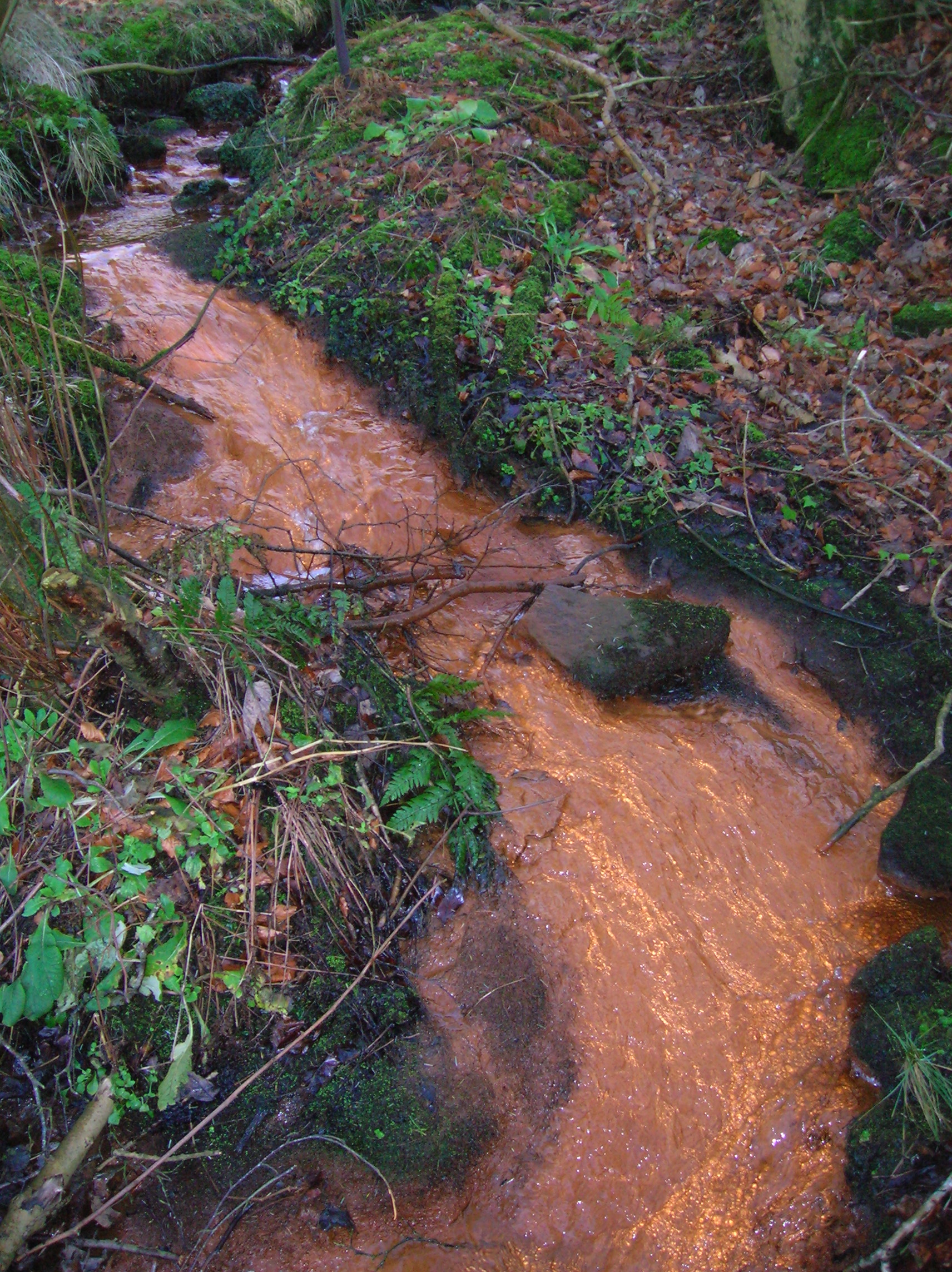
A red burn rich in iron salts running into the Lugton Water near Redwells.

Greenlea, Wardlaw, Law, Redwells, Mid Auchenmade, South Auchenmade, Sunnyside, Sidehead, and Bentfauld farms are in the immediate area.

The name 'Wardlaw' is said to derive from 'Watch Hill' as it has a prominent position and a good view therefore. The satellite views of the area around Auchentiber show up the old rig and furrow systems of pre-mechanised agriculture.

=== The Ghost of Auchentiber ===
The 'Leddy o'Clumbeith' is a ghost story told by Dr. Duguid circa 1840 in the 1820s. A servant girl from the farm of Clonbeith was making her way to the Blair Tavern to keep a tryst when she fell into a mine shaft, horse and all, and was killed. Others say that her 'lad' killed her and then jumped into the shaft after her. Her ghost haunts the fields around Auchentiber.

=== The Lady in the peat ===
Dr. Duguid in around the 1840s records that near Clumbeith (Clonbeith) on the way to "Meg'swa's" he met Pate Glunch cutting peats. Pate was normally a still, dour man, but on this occasion he was highly animated and took the doctor to see the long dead corpse of a "bonnie lady" lying in a hole in the peat. She was around 18 to 20 years of age, had rosy cheeks, a sweet smile playing around her lips and blonde hair. Her identity was unknown, but a rumour linked her to the family of the Montgreenan estate.

== Views of the Auchentiber area ==
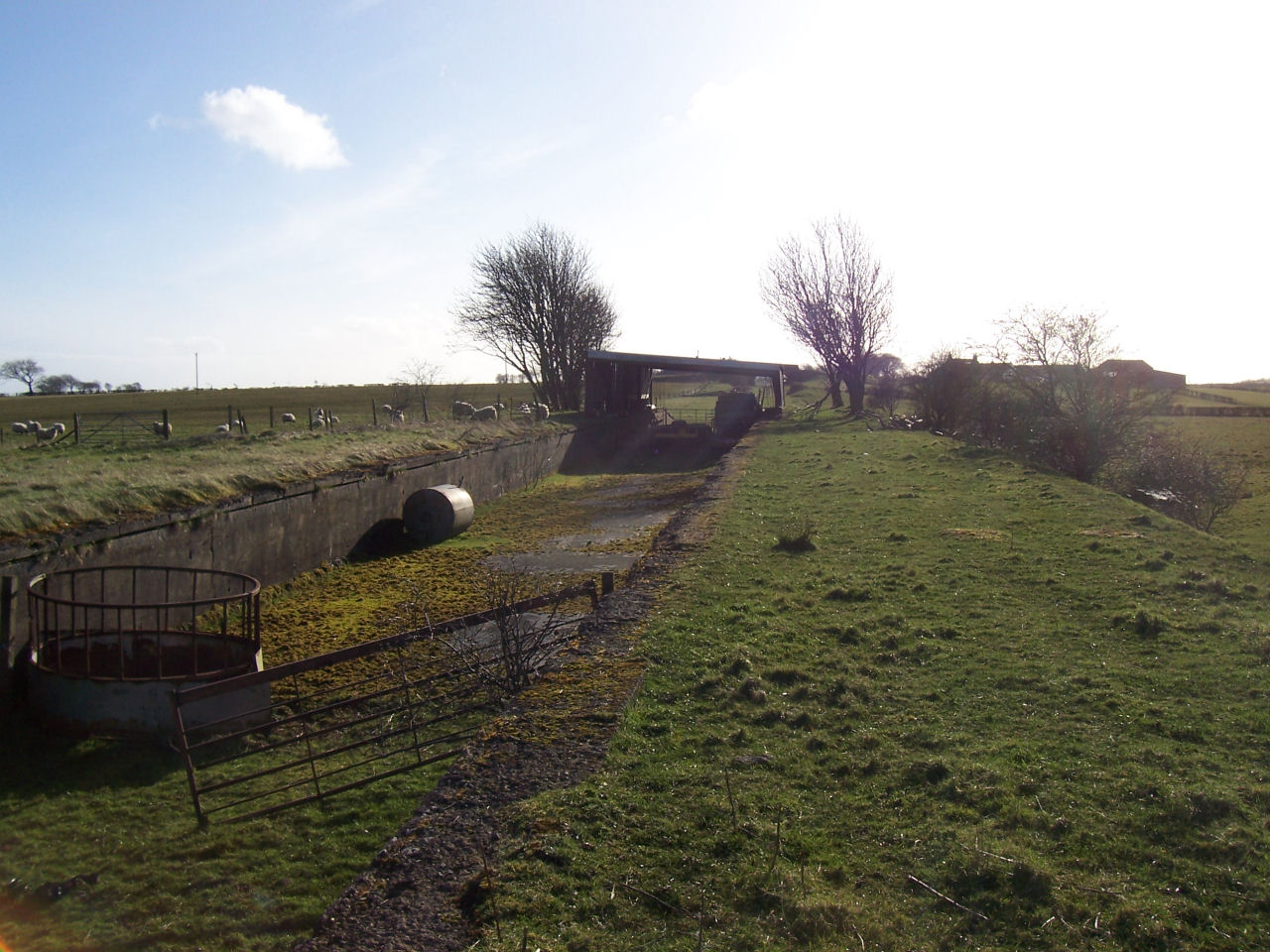
Auchenmade's old railway station

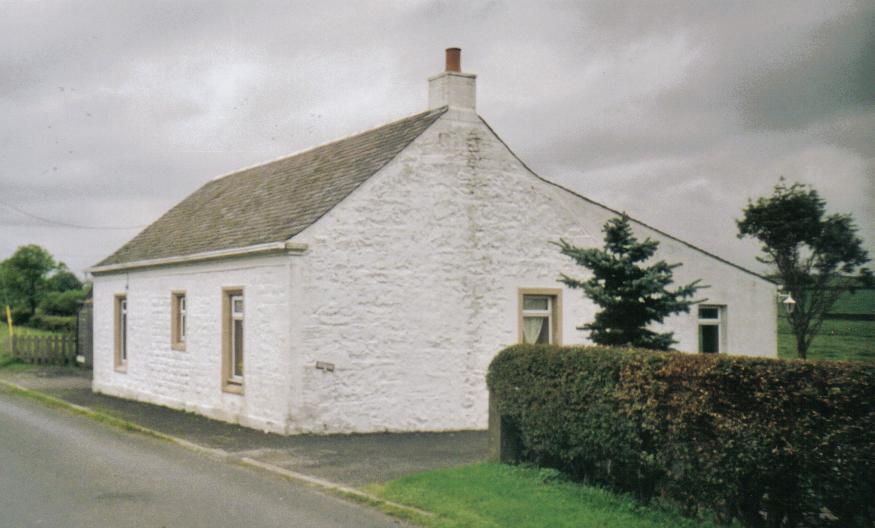
Bloak or Salt Well cottage off the Stewarton Road.

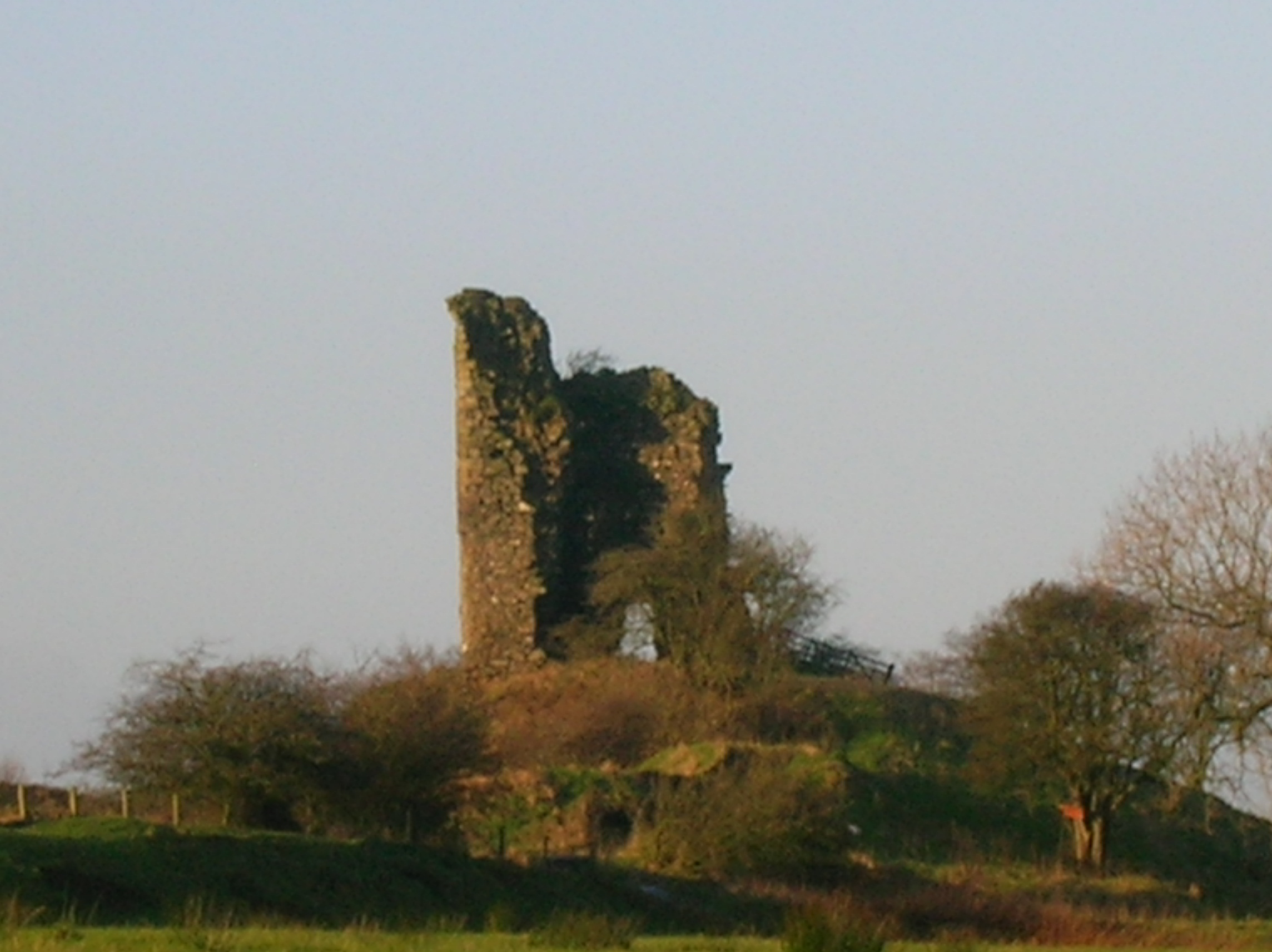
Auchenharvie Castle in 2007.

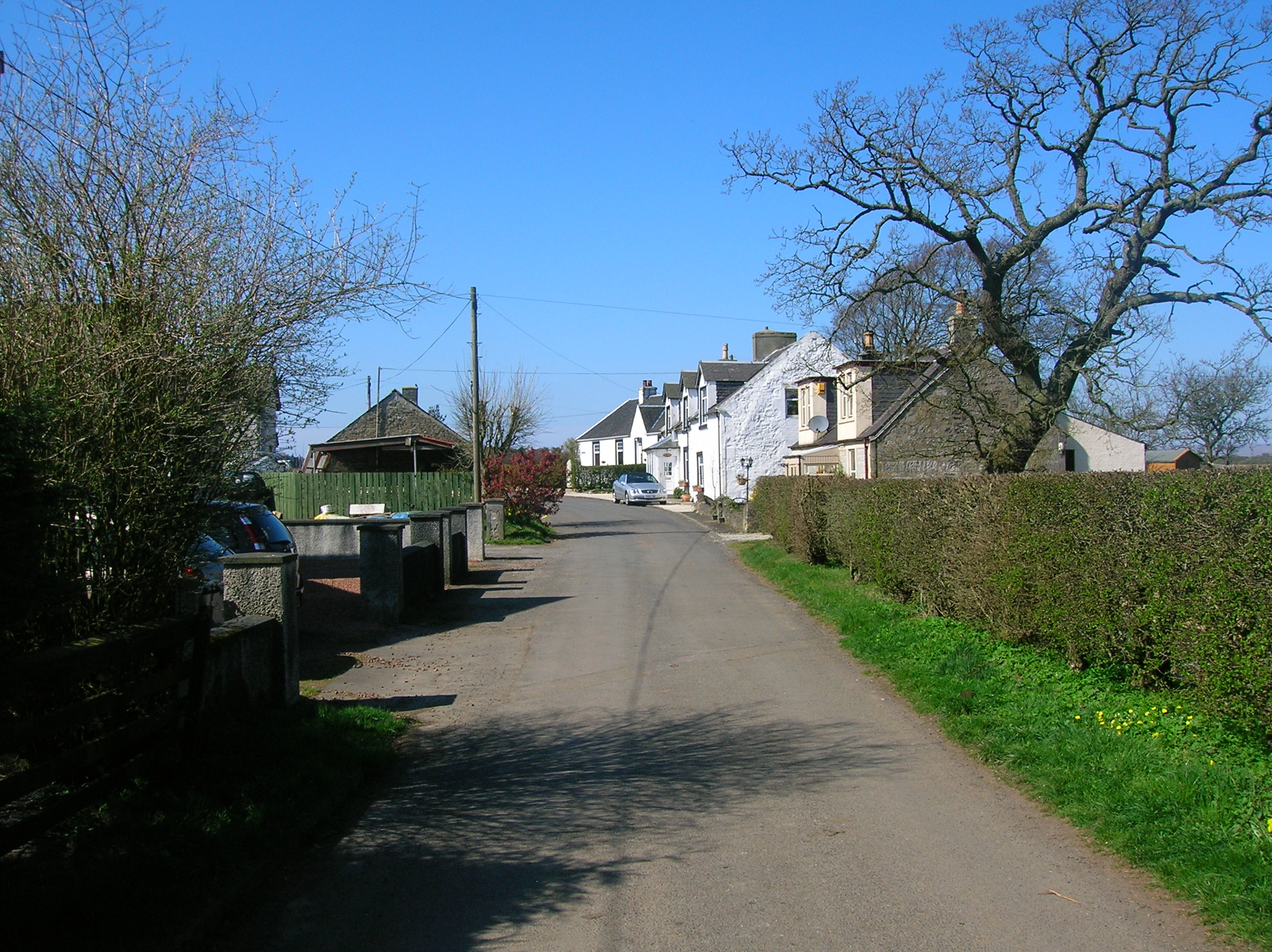
The mainstreet looking towards the main road.

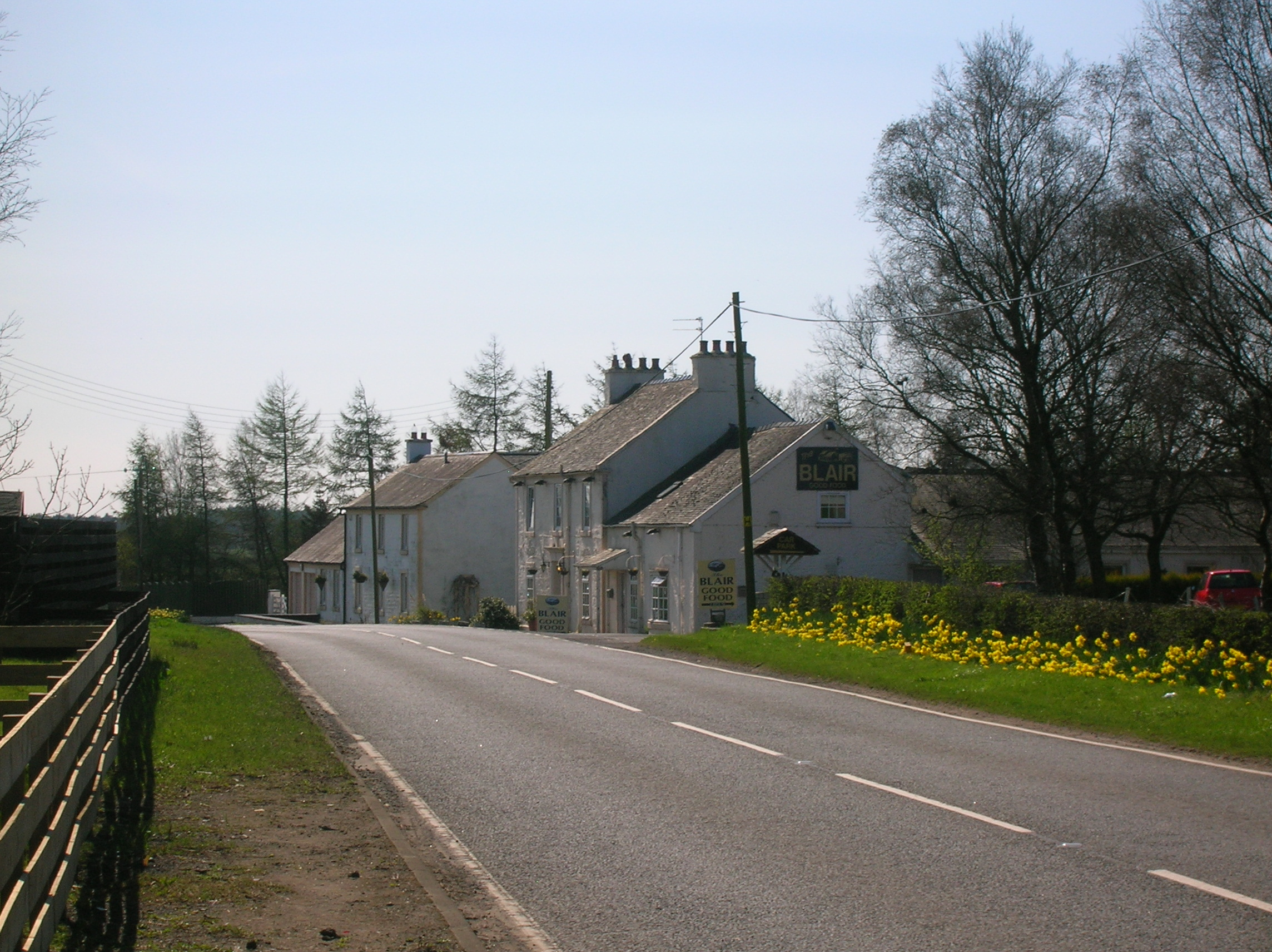
The Blair Tavern on the main road.

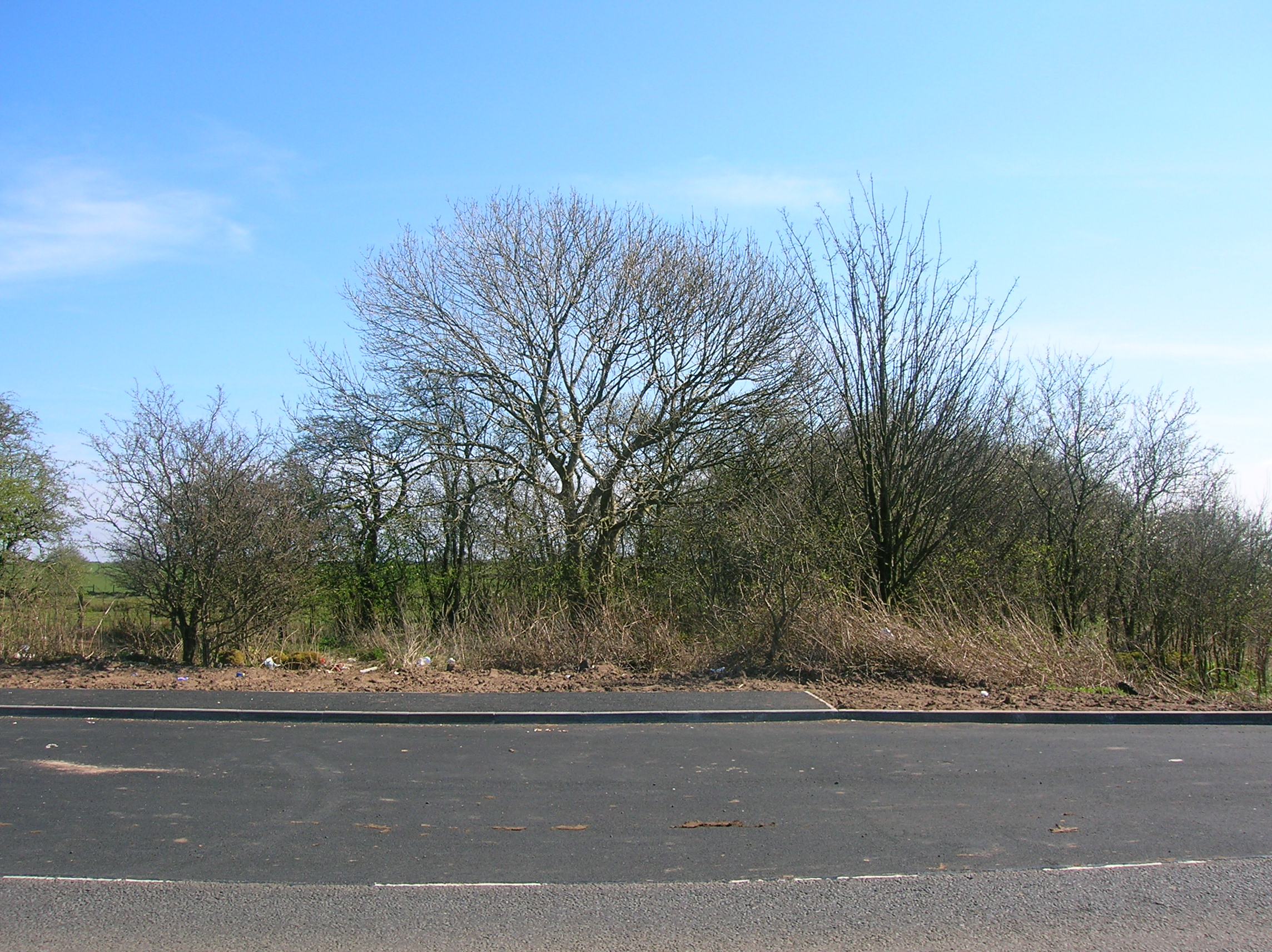
The site of the old Cleikum Inn on the main road.

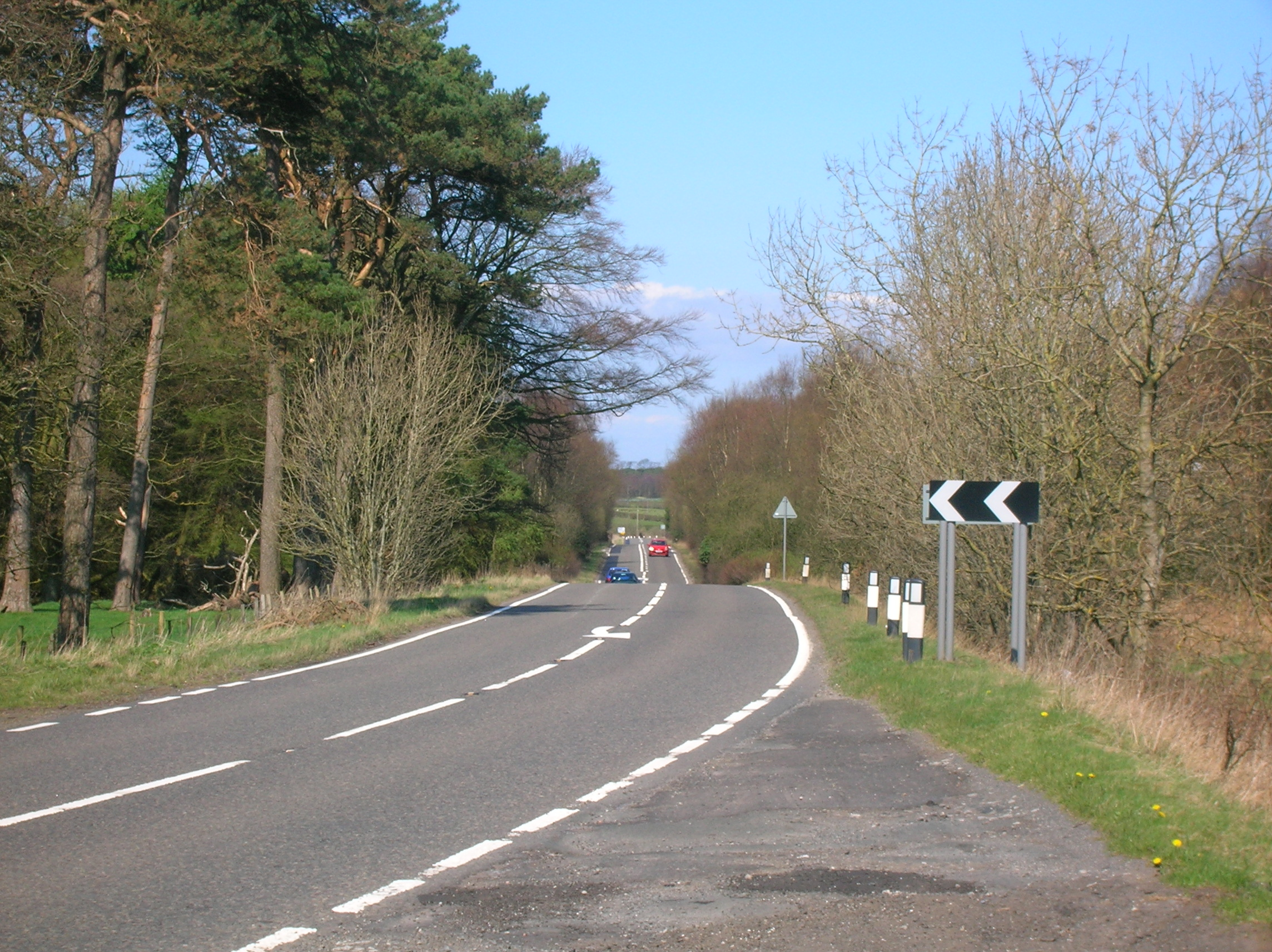
The Lochlibo Road running through Bloak Moss looking towards Auchentiber.

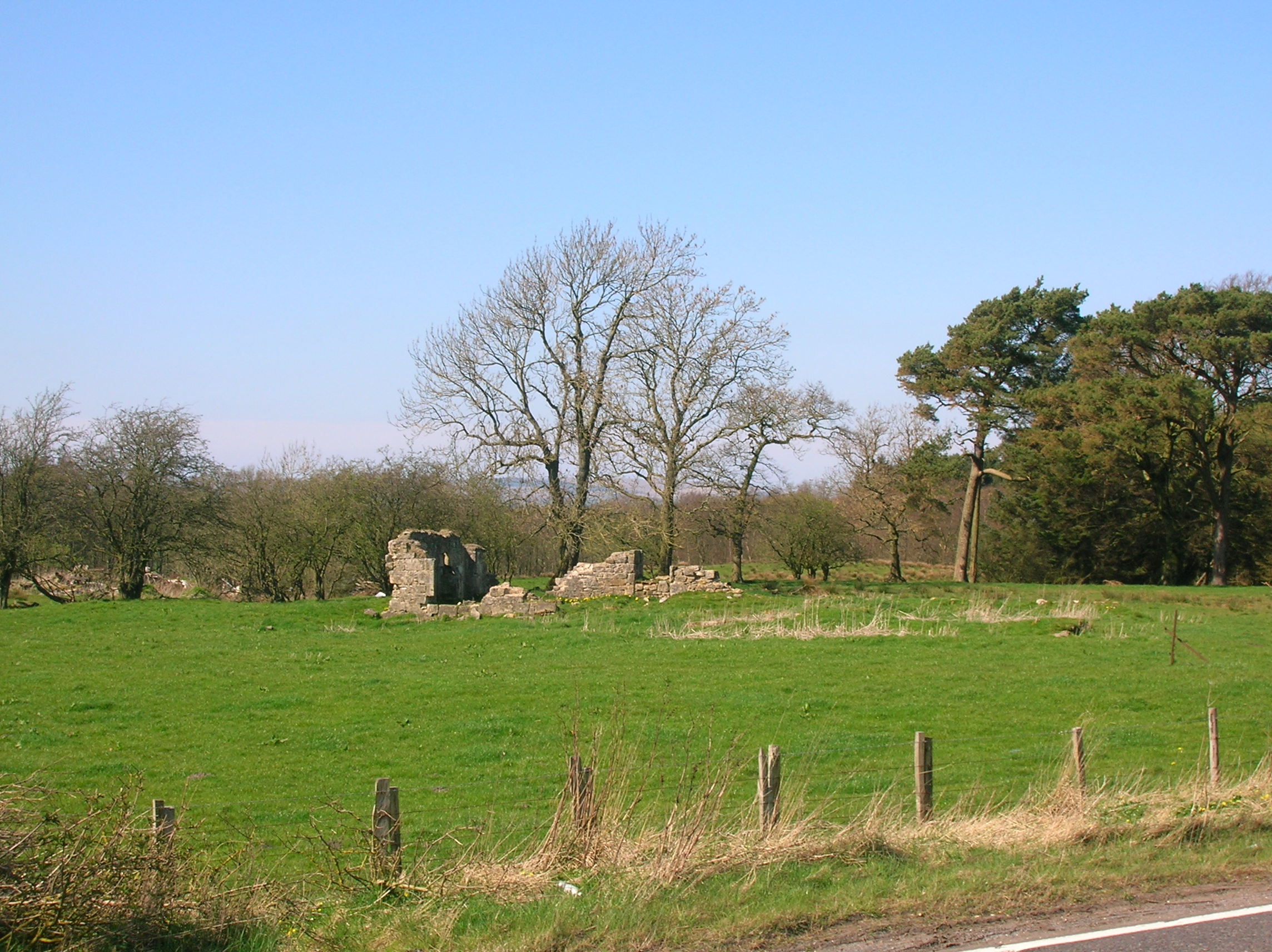
The ruins of the old Mosside farm on the Montgreenan estate near Bloak Moss.

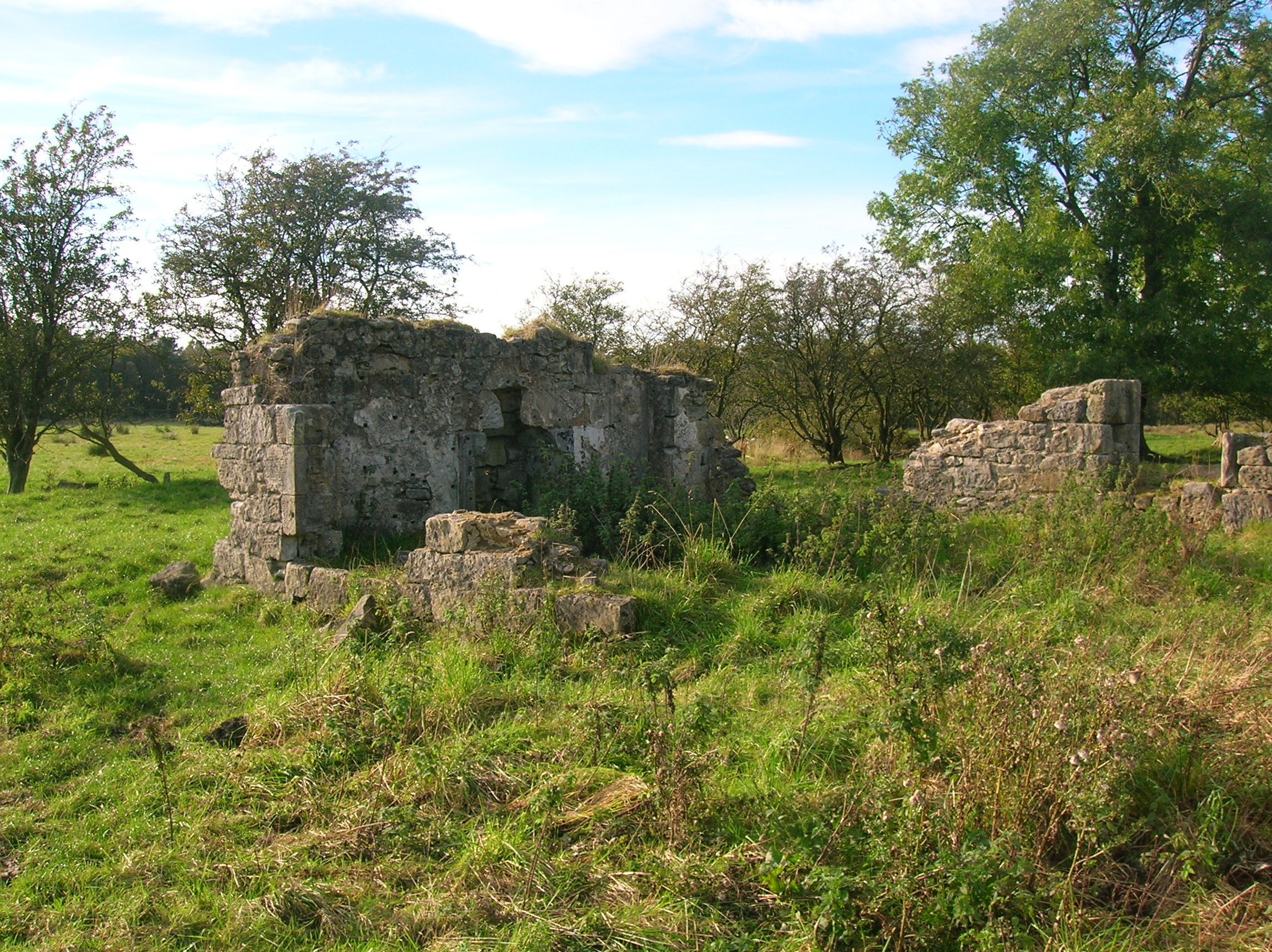
The ruins of the old Mosside farmhouse which was demolished in 1971.

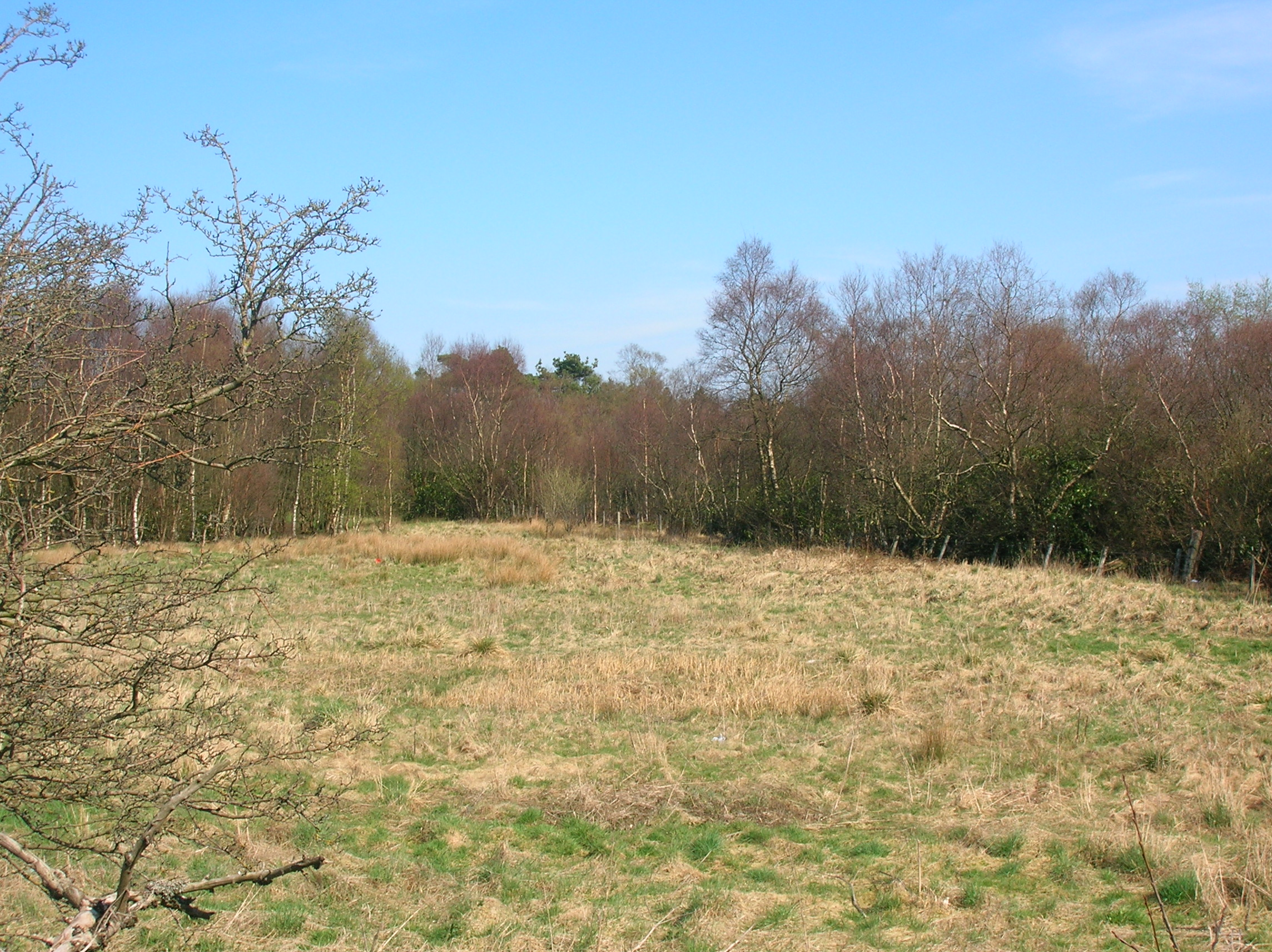
A view of Bloak Moss.

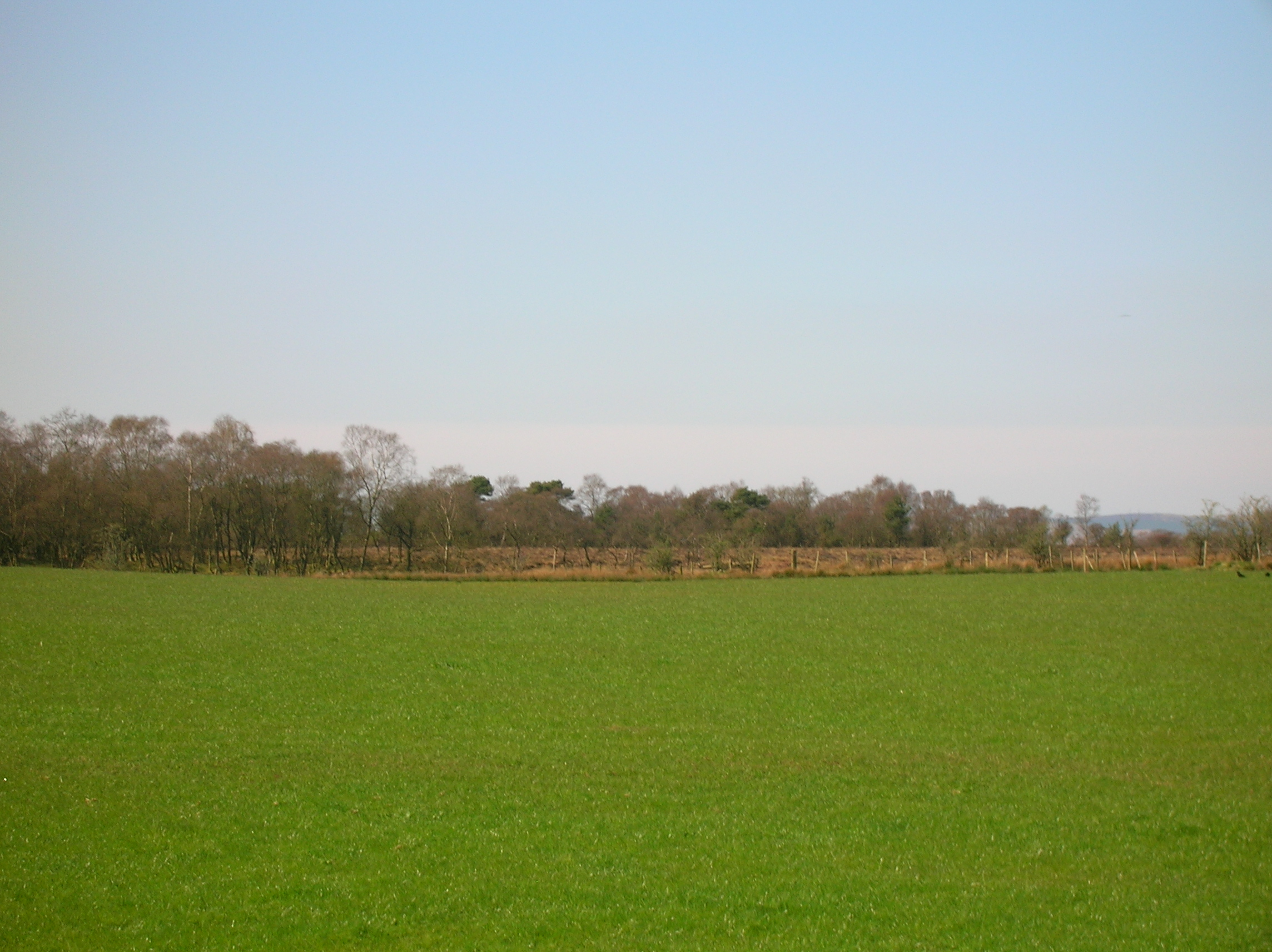
Auchentiber Moss from the site of the Cleikum Inn.

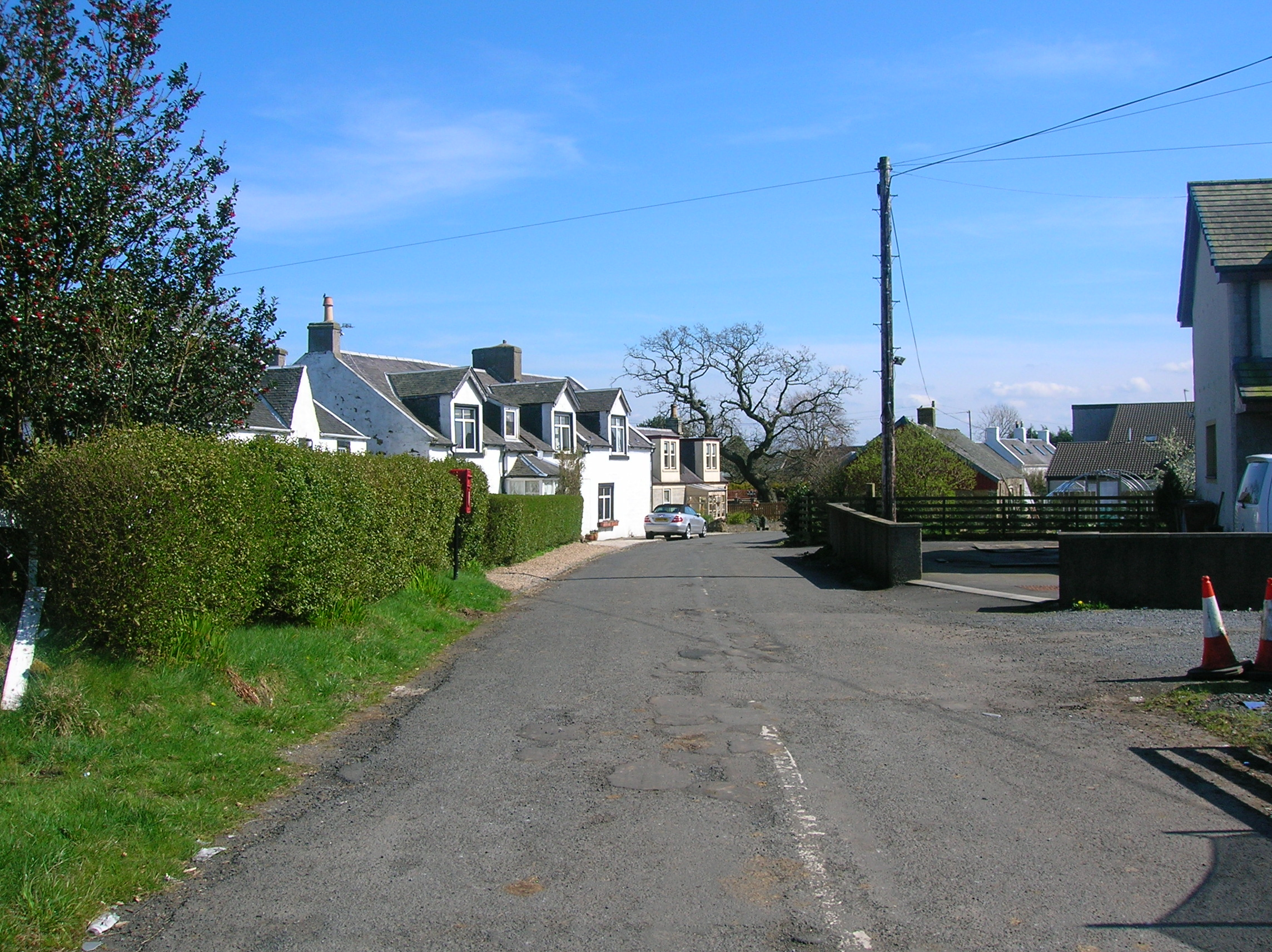
The mainstreet with the site of the old school on the right.

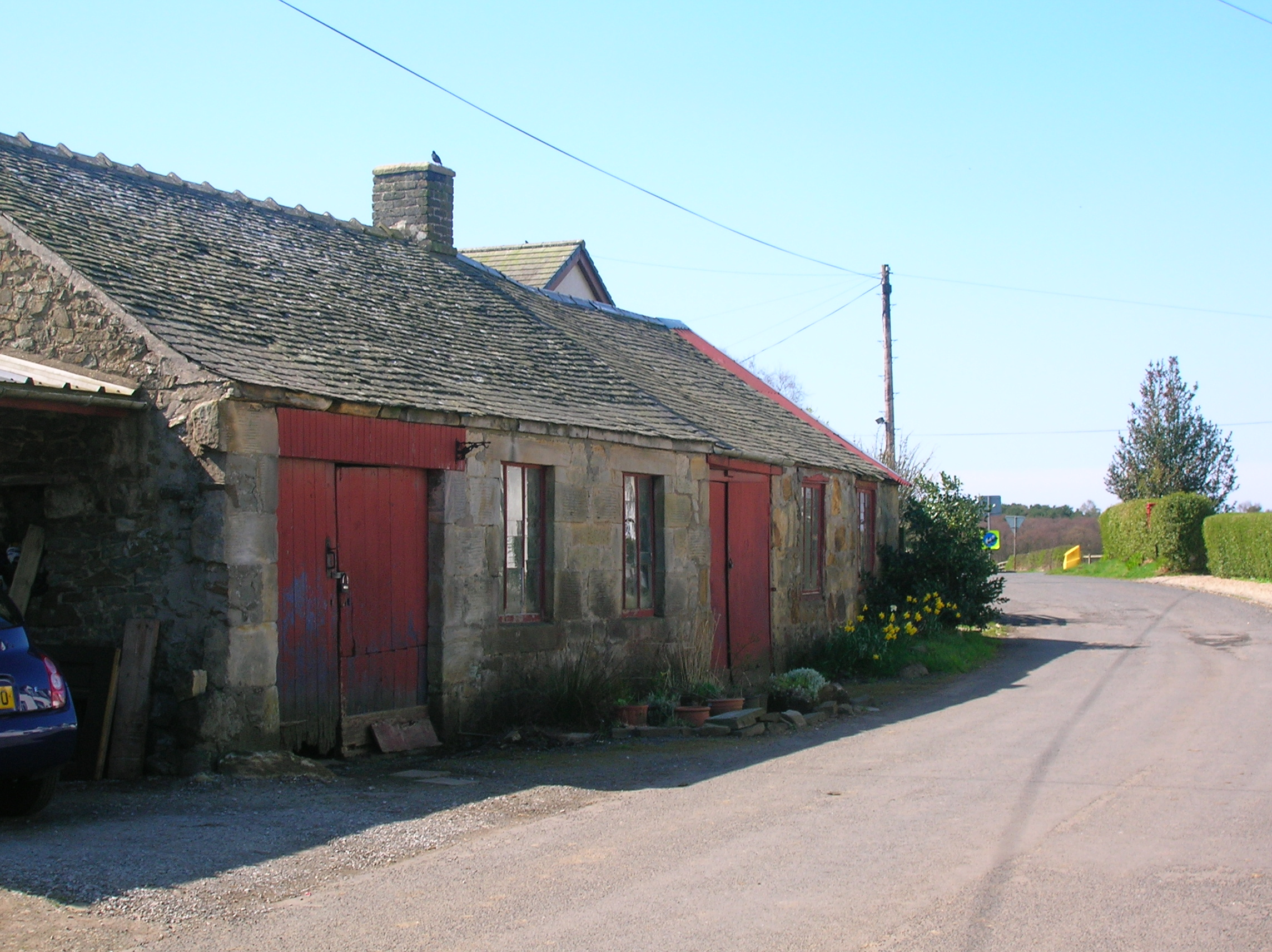
The old Smithy in the mainstreet. The roof on the closest building has since collapsed (2007).

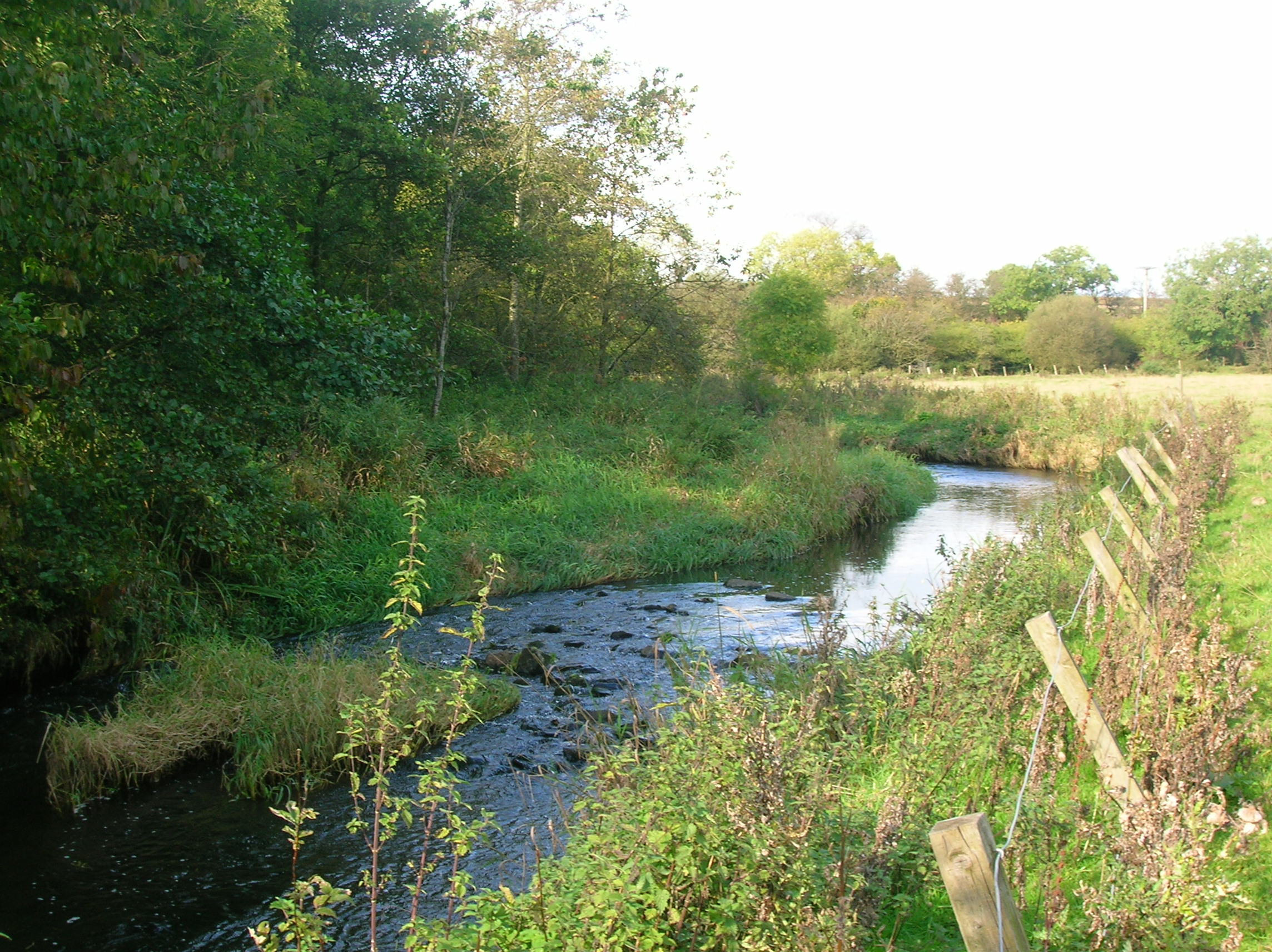
The Lugton Water near the old ford.

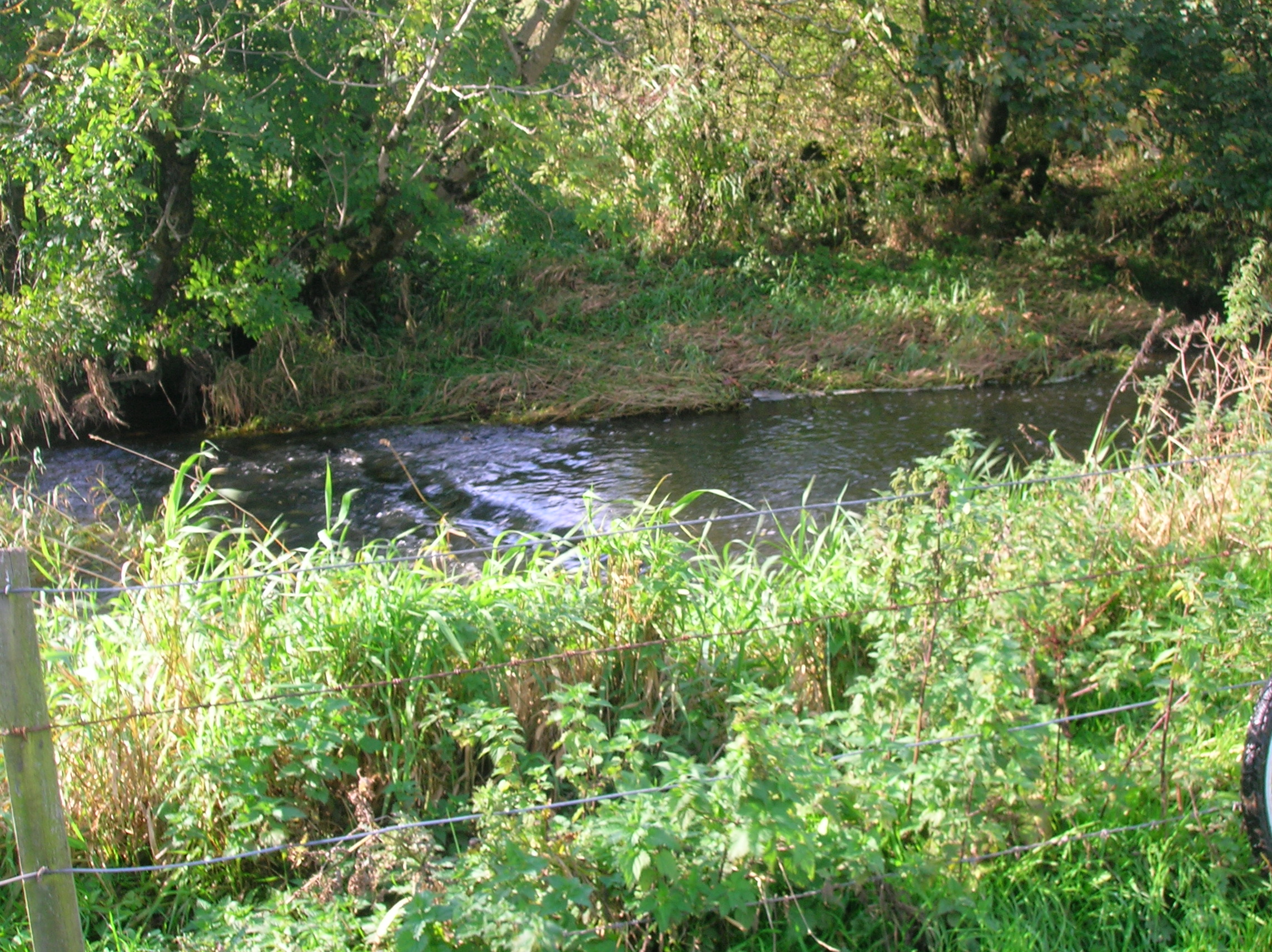
The Old ford across the Lugton Water near the site of the Waulkmill.

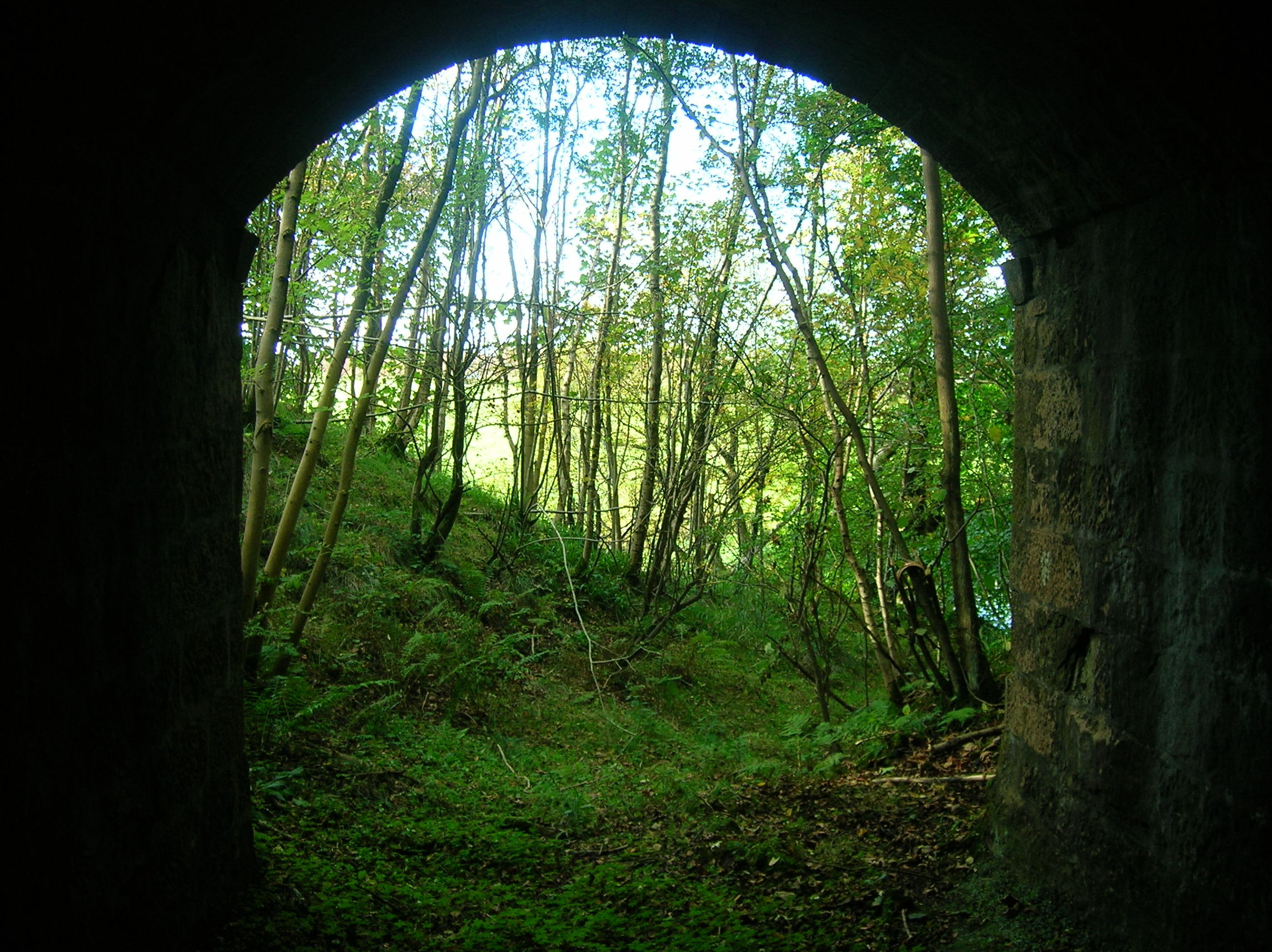
Looking through the Mosside bridge onto the Lugton Water at the site of the old ford up to Megswells.

== Micro history ==
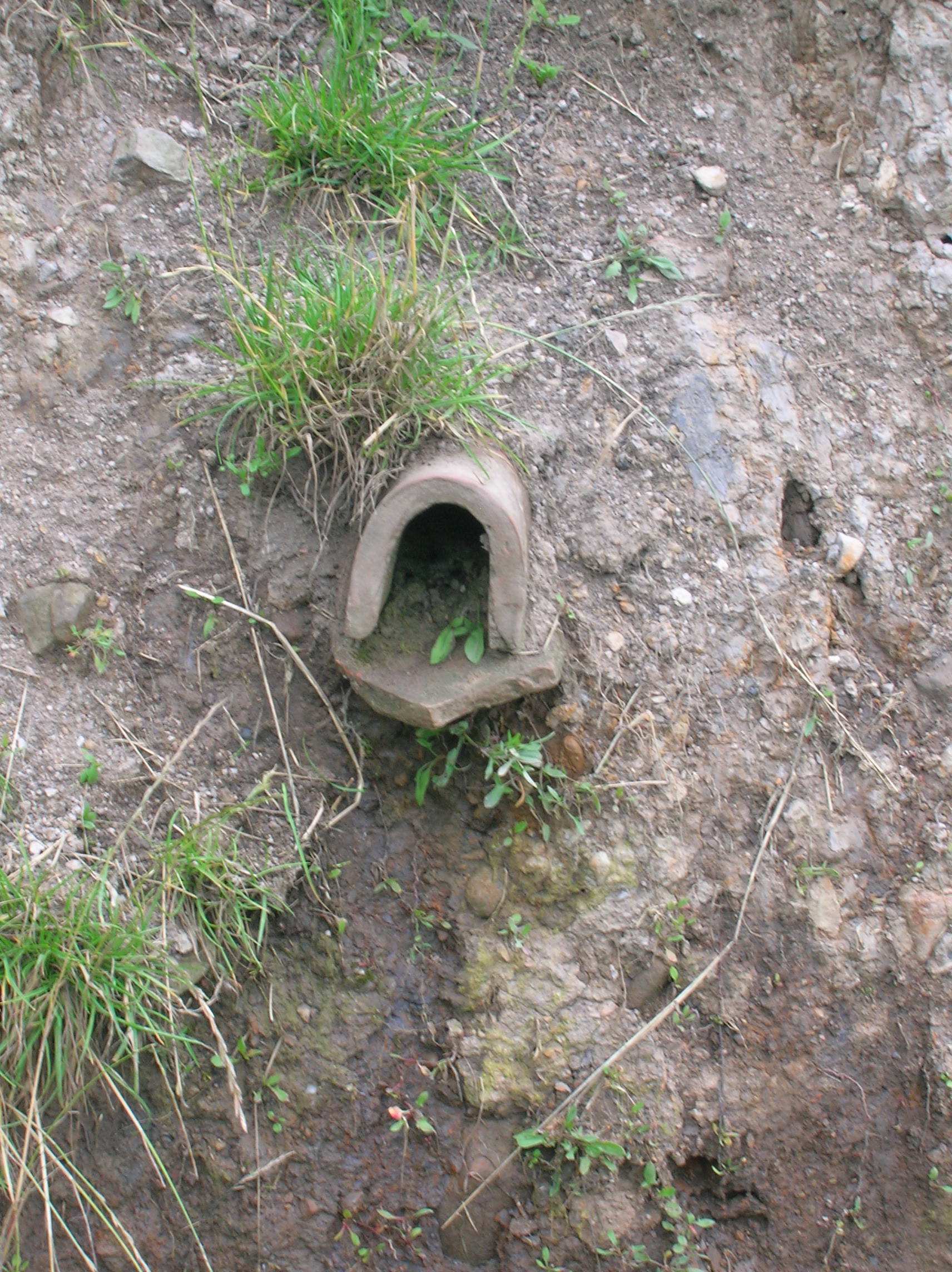
Mug and sole drain (18th century), essential in the reclamation of the mosses.

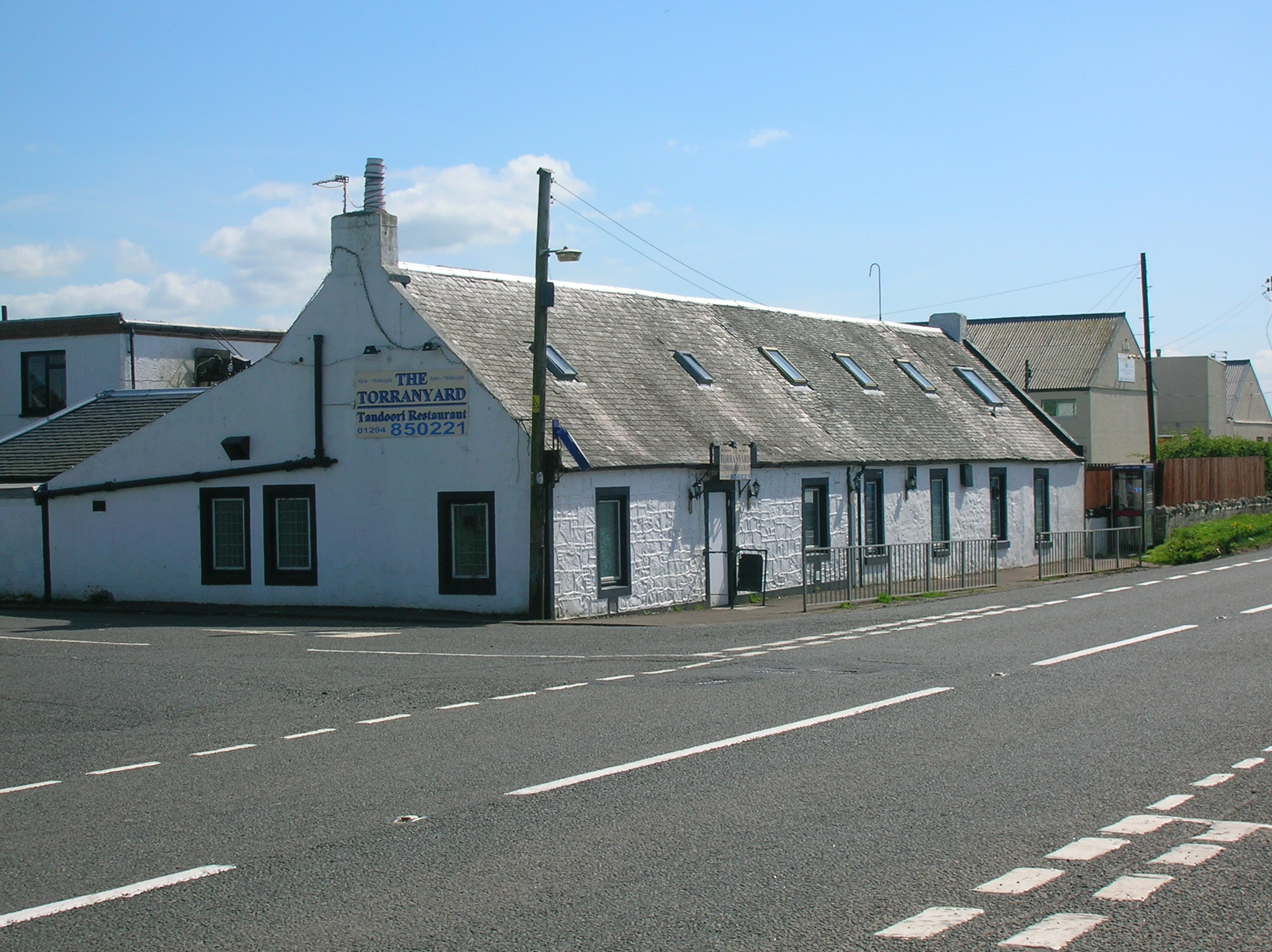
The Torranyard Inn. 2007.

In 1507 a nominal fine is next inflicted on a Cuthbert Robisoune, farmer in Auchentiber, for an assault committed on one of his neighbours and upon the son. The latter he had cast into the fire, burning him severely. The fine was five merks.

The old estate of Montgreenan is now a hotel, about 1 1/4 miles (2 kilometres) away towards Torranyard.

The ruin of Auchenharvie Castle is a prominent feature of this flat landscape in the Torranyard area.

A smithy is marked on the 1860 OS map on the 'hamlet' side of the crossroads and the relatively unchanged building is still present today (2007), the roof has since collapsed (2008). The site of the old hamlet school is now occupied by modern buildings.

Bloak Moss has been scientifically investigated to ascertain its vegetational history through the analysis of core samples.

Steven states that a "village" called Bloak with about twelve families existed in 1842, with its own school. It was near the Bloak or salt well.

A few springs or tibers (Scottish Gaelic: tiobair) are still visible as the source of small burns running into the Glazert beyond Wardlaw farm.

== See also ==
- River Irvine
- Eglinton Country Park
