= Blae Loch =

Lake in Ayrshire, Scotland

Coordinates: 55°44′47.5″N 4°33′21.1″W

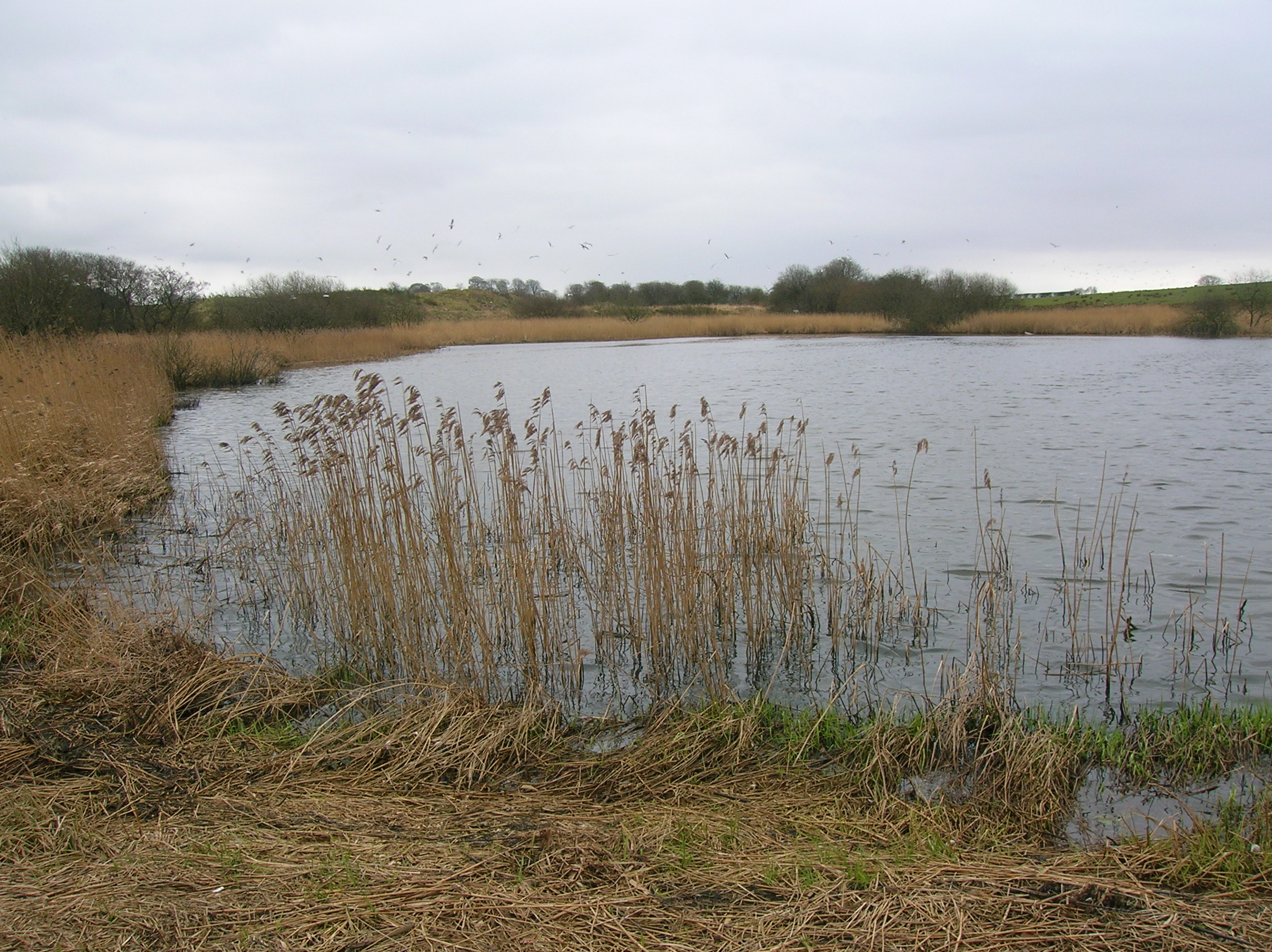
- Blae Loch, East bank looking South

- Location of Blae Loch, North Ayrshire
- Location: Blaelochhead and Lochend, North Ayrshire, Scotland
- Type: Freshwater loch
- Primary inflows: Highgate Burn, an un-named burn, rainfall and runoff
- Primary outflows: Bungle Burn
- Basin countries: Scotland
- Max. length: c. 600 ft (180 m)
- Max. width: c. 200 ft (61 m)
- Average depth: Shallow
- Islands: None
- Settlements: Beith

The Blae Loch is a small freshwater loch situated in a hollow in a low-lying area beneath Blaelochhead Hill in the Parish of Beith, North Ayrshire, Scotland.

== History ==
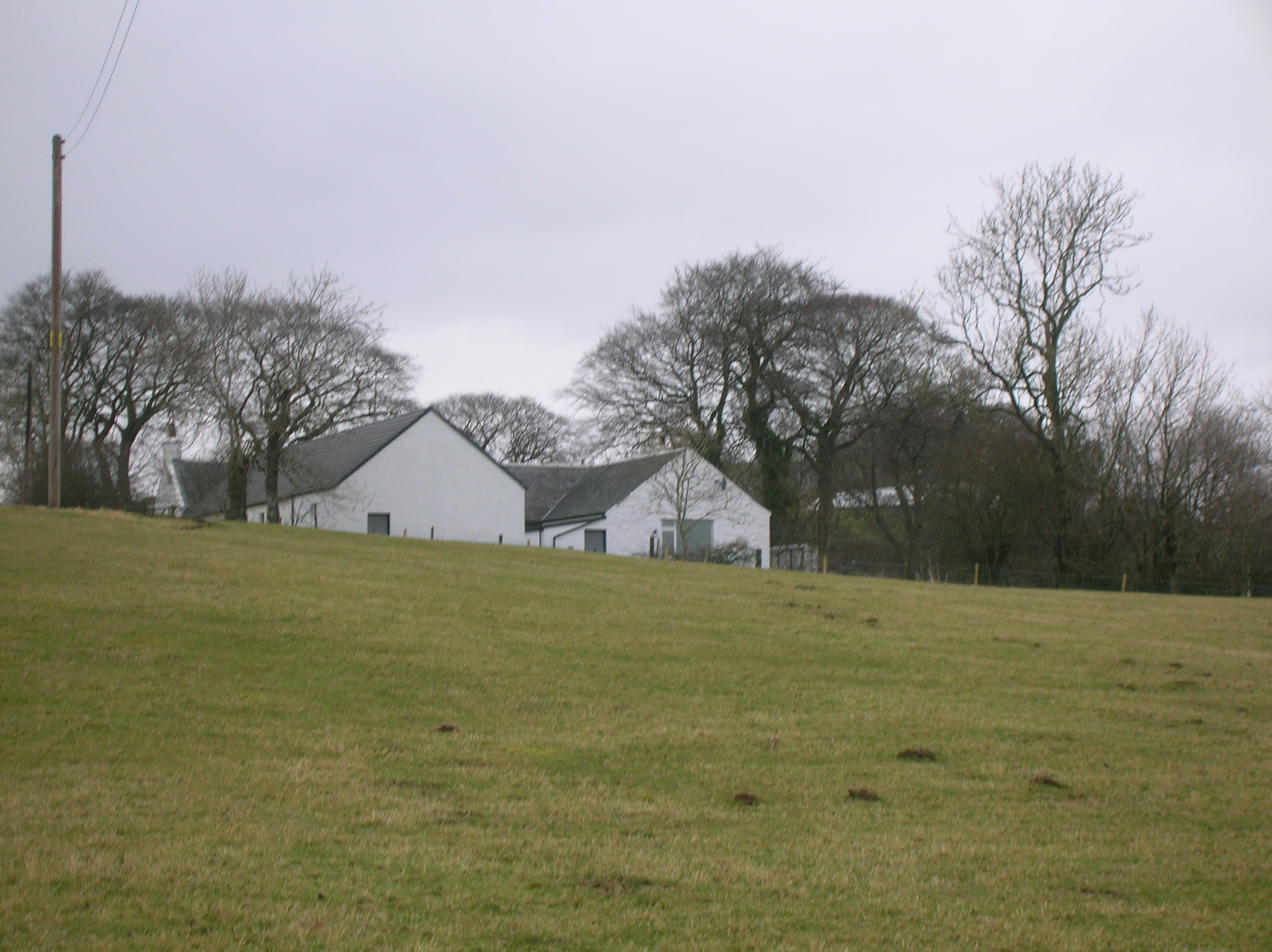
Lochend Farm from the loch.

The loch is a natural feature, a post-glacial kettle hole once of a greater extent, fed mainly by local springs, the Highgate Burn which itself arises as a spring near Little Highgate and field drainage. The loch is recorded in the placenames of Blaelochhead, Lochend, and Blaelochside.

The name 'Blae' is Scots for 'dark, livid, or black'. The first known description in circa 1604 gives the name as 'Blaa-loche' and states that quhen the firmament is moft ferene and cleir then its is palide and dead coloured contrair to all wther vn-corrupt and fueit vatters. A 'Bungle' in Scots is a “Big clod of earth turned up in harrowing.

The New Statistical Account of 1845 refers to it as having been partially drained.

In 1874 it was part of the estate of Hessilhead, owned by William Ralston-Patrick of Trearne. In 2011 the loch ownership was owned shared between the owners of Blaelochhead Farm and Lochend House.

The Bungle Burn outflow runs on down country, past the old mill site, Mossend and Tandlehill Farms, before making a confluence with the Lugton Water near the Bungleburn Bridge outside Burnhouse.

=== Usage ===
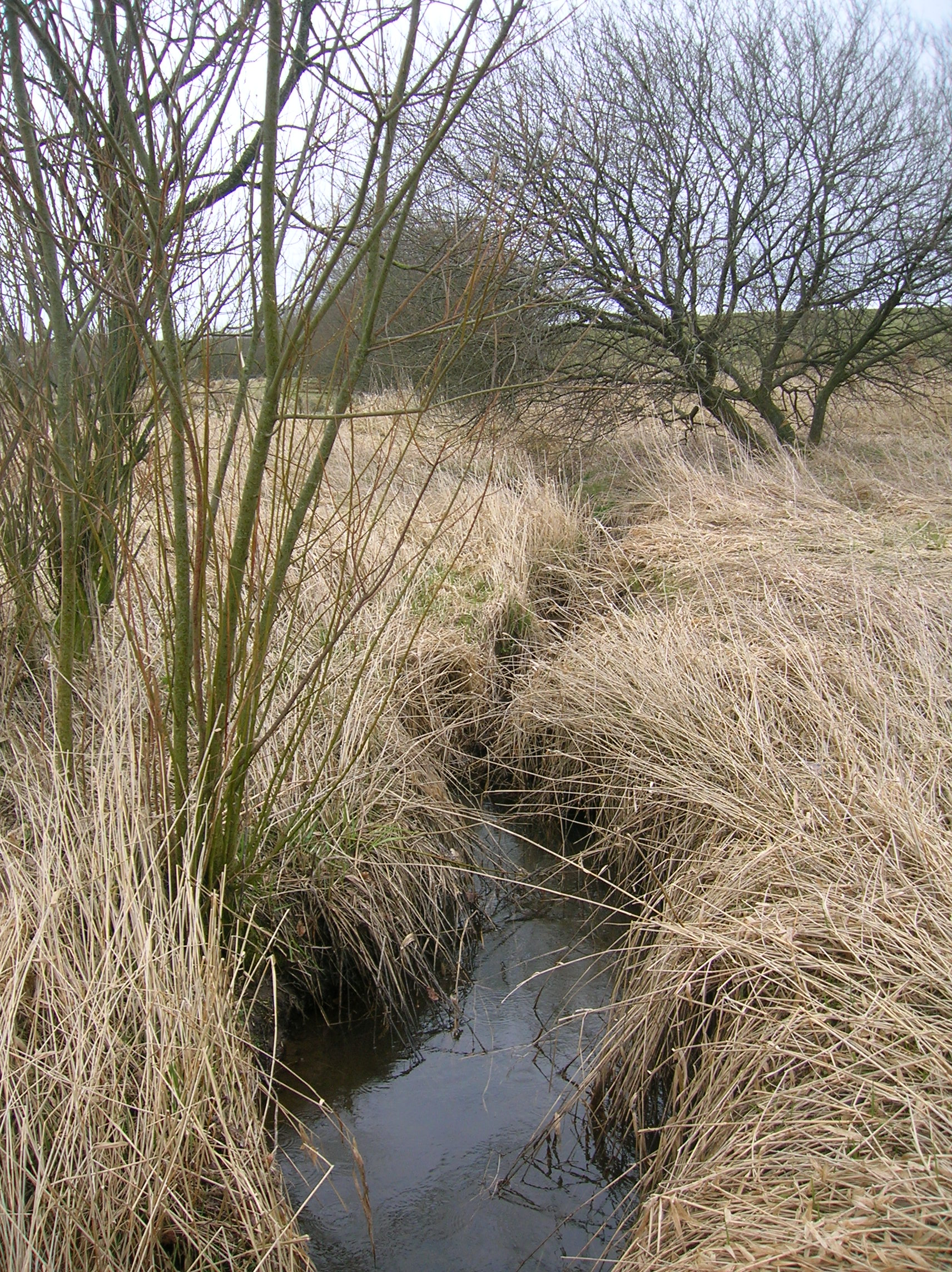
The Highgate Burn inflow with willows and reed canary grass.

Ordnance Survey maps of the mid 19th century show that a substantial water mill with a square garden area once existed near Wester Highgate; it had a large mill pond associated with it, fed by the Bungle Burn running from the Blae Loch. The name is also recorded in the former limestone 'Old Mill Quarry'. Roy's map of 1747 shows the mill and even then marks it as an 'old' mill, suggesting that it was out of use at this time. An old lane ran up to the old mill site from the hamlet of Hessilhead.

The loch is recorded in 1604-1608 as being well known to many weavers in the neighbourhood due to the abundance of reeds that grew there and the fact that they were used for making pirns. In 1874 it is recorded that the loch margin had an edging of water-lilies (Nymphaea species). A pirn was a weaver's spool for holding his weft yarn in the shuttle, originally made from a quill or hollow reed, in later times they were made from wood.

A Blae Loch Curling Club existed in the 19th century as recorded by the Royal Caledonian Curling Club. A club medal is still in existence.

=== Geology ===
The solid geology is macroporphyritic basalt with carboniferous limestone at the Middleton Quarry site and these are both overlain by low river terrace and lake alluvium. A whinstone crag and old quarry site sit close to Lochend Farm.

=== Cartographic evidence ===
Blaeu's map of 1654, dating from Timothy Pont's survey of circa 1604, shows the loch as a significant body of water, extending almost as far as the old Whitestone Mill (Coldstream Mill). Herman Moll's map of 1745 marks, but does not name the loch. Roy's map of 1747 clearly shows the loch, situated without two inflow burns and the habitations of Loch End and Blea Loch Head. Armstrong's map of 1775 does not show the loch. Thomson's map of 1832 marks and records Blae Loch.

== Natural history ==
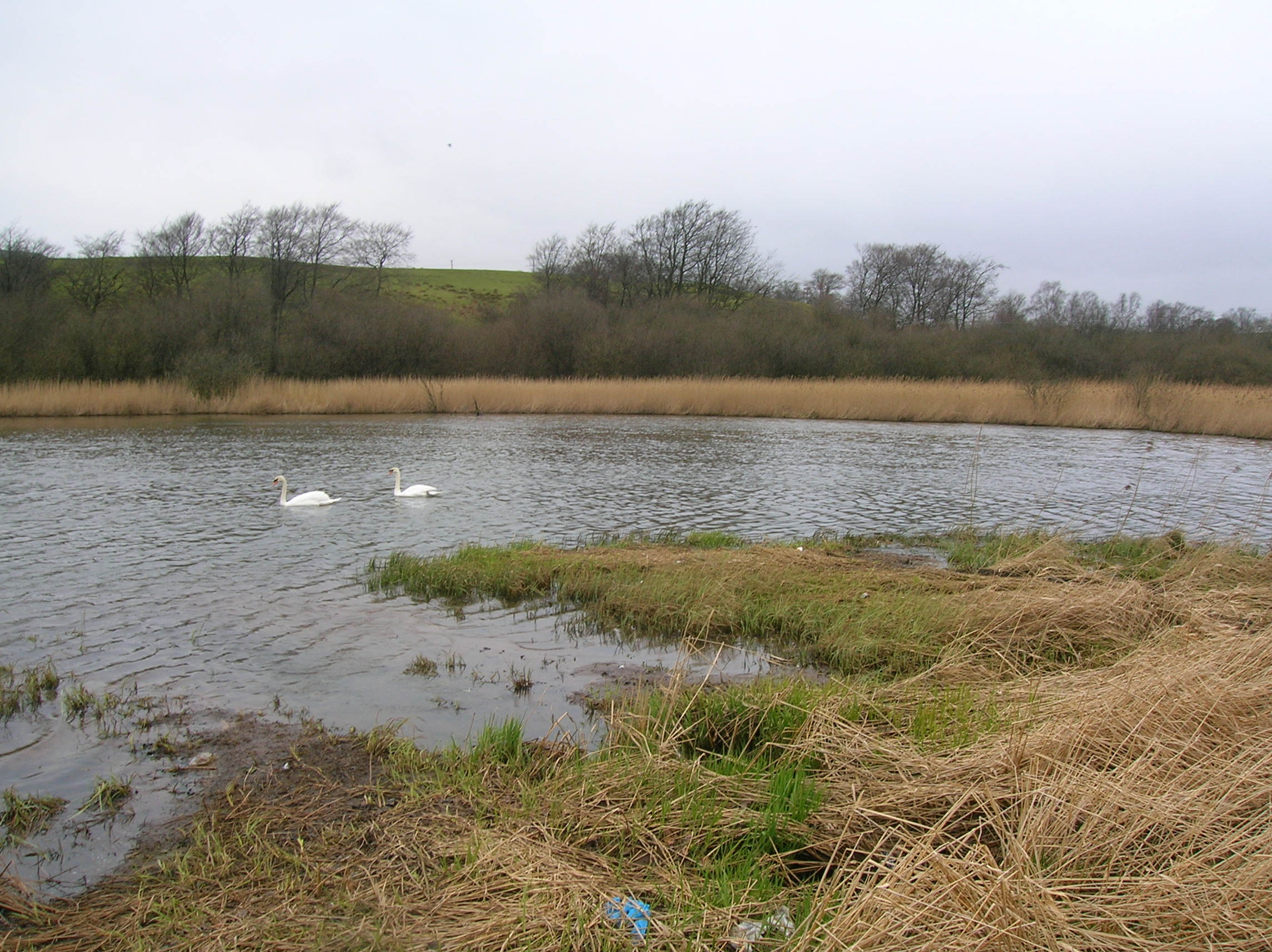
The northern end with resident swans.

The site is a designated 'Local Wildlife Site' following a survey in 1981 by the Scottish Wildlife Trust and others. The survey recorded that the site is a 'Phragmites dominated area with open water'. The surveyors record that "The loch is surrounded to a great extent by bed of reed canary grass with a dense zone of the sedge Carex aquatilis. There is a good admixture of marsh species, and an admixture of willow (Salix) species in the north-east section. In the surrounding fields there is an interesting interaction between the field ragwort (Senecio jacobaea) and the marsh ragwort (Senecio aquaticus), giving rise to a substantial amount of the hybrid Senecio x osterfeldii. There is a good floristic structure at the site and it is also of real importance due to the presence of the very rare Cowbane (Cicuta virosa)."

== Birds ==
Bird species recorded here include common kestrel, reed bunting, water rail, robin, starling, common snipe, mallard, and mute swan. Rare species are Carex aquatilis, brown sedge (Carex disticha), cowbane (Cicuta virosa), white water lily (Nymphaea alba), ivy-leaved water crowfoot (Ranunculus hederaceus), and bay willow (salix pentandra).

== Micro-history ==
Lochend Farm was partly constructed from whinstone taken from the nearby quarry.

Middleton Quarry was for a time used as a site for testing explosives by Nobel Explosives, Ardreer. The quarry has been infilled.

Several other Blae Lochs are located in North Ayrshire and elsewhere in Scotland.

== See also ==
- Broadstone Castle and Barony, Ayrshire
- Barony and Castle of Giffen
- Greenhills, North Ayrshire
- Lugton
- Gateside, North Ayrshire
