= Auchenharvie =

Coordinates: 55.6389°N 4.7708°W

Auchenharvie is an area of Stevenston, North Ayrshire in Scotland.

Lucy Oswald of Auchenharvie House

There are several local institutions, organizations and businesses use this name. These include:

- Auchenharvie Colliery
- Auchenharvie Academy
- Auchenharvie House and estate.

Also using the same name, but some distance away near Torranyard, is Auchenharvie Castle.

The Coat of Arms of the Cunninghames of Auchenharvie
