= Burnhouse =

Coordinates: 55.71936°N 4.576327°W

Burnhouse: Scottish Gaelic: Burnas; Scots: Burnhoose; The Trap
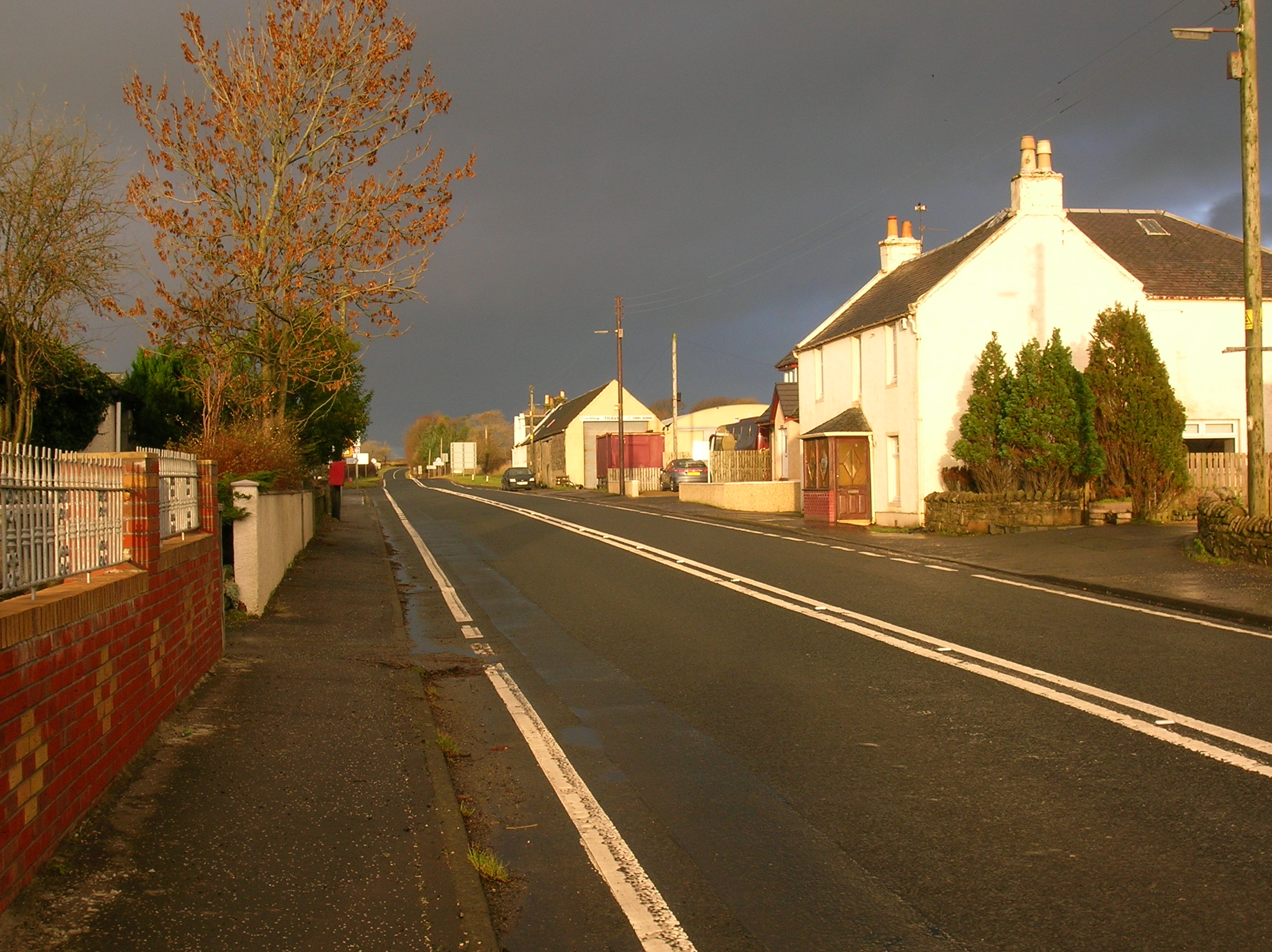
- A view of the village looking towards Torranyard and Irvine

- Location within North Ayrshire
- OS grid reference: NS 38431 50338
- Council area: North Ayrshire
- Lieutenancy area: Ayrshire and Arran
- Country: Scotland
- Sovereign state: United Kingdom
- Dialling code: 01560
- Police: Scotland
- Fire: Scottish
- Ambulance: Scottish
- UK Parliament: Central Ayrshire
- Scottish Parliament: Cunninghame South

Burnhouse, sometimes known locally as The Trap from "Man Trap", is a small village or hamlet in North Ayrshire, Parish of Beith, Scotland. It lies on a crossroads of old B706 and the more recent A736 Lochlibo Road, between Lugton and Torranyard.

== History ==
Roy's map of 1747 records the settlement of Burnhouse on the Beith to Kilmarnock road, the Lochlibo Road did not exist at the time. Armstrong's map of 1775 still does not mark the Lochlibo Road as it had not yet been constructed. The 1828 John Thomson's map is the first to show Burnhouse as a crossroads with the newly constructed Lochlibo Road and a Cross Roads Inn. It also shows a "square" of roads on the west side of the village that are no longer present, although the old ford on the Bungle Burn near the Burnhouse Manor Hotel entrance is still discernible.

The settlement lay within the old Barony of Giffen; the castle no longer exists.

=== The Trap ===
The "Trap" is a contraction of "Man Trap" or "Trap 'Em" because the village lies on the old turnpike road, the busy Lochlibo Road from Irvine to Glasgow via Lugton where dealers, drovers, travellers, etc. on their business or returning from markets in the old days were prone to stop and spend their money at the inns; it was so named by the farmers wives and eventually it was shorted to "The Trap". The inn at Lugton was called the "Lug 'Em Inn", that at Auchentiber the "Cleek 'Em Inn", and finally the one at Torranyard was called the "Turn 'Em Out".

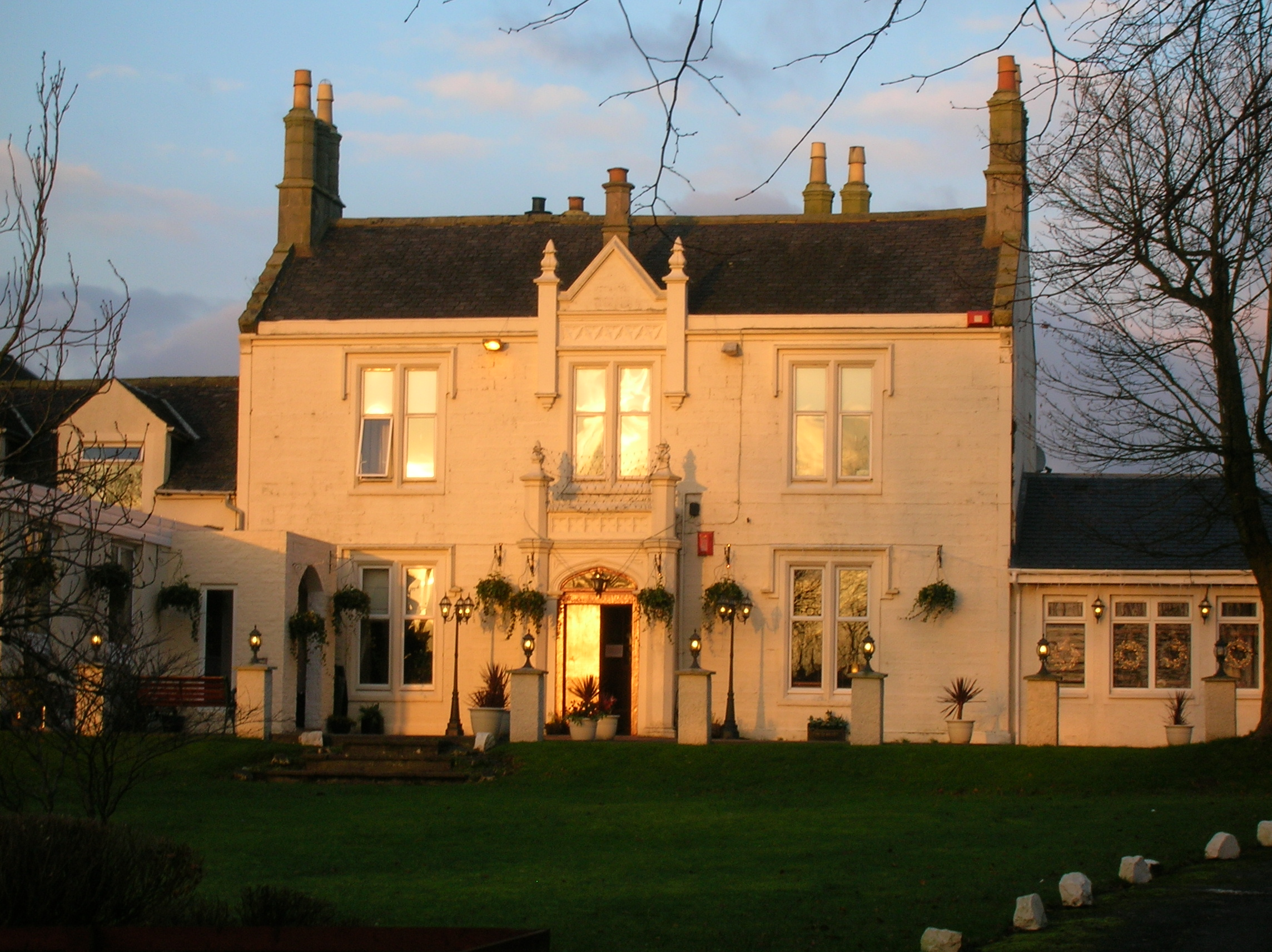
Burnhouse Manor Hotel

A Crossroads Inn is marked on John Thomson's map of 1828 and in 1858 it had two inns at the crossroads, the Burnhouse Inn and the Waggoners Inn, no longer shown on the 1911 OS.

A Grain Store was once located at Burnhouse, local farmers brought their grain here to be weighed and sold. A Ham Curing business existed here, serving the surrounding farms. A joinery shop here made furniture which had a good reputation for quality. A Police Station was present, complete with a cell and the well next to it was the main source of water for villagers. The village shop was opposite the old inn. A weighing station was located opposite the entrance to Burnhouse Manor Hotel.

Mr. Howatson started a threshing and baling business here in 1928, worked by a traction engine. Howatson was a pioneer of lime spreading machinery.

What is now Burnhouse Manor Hotel was present as a private house on the 1858 OS map and as the "Manor House" in 1911. In the 1870s, whilst nearby Trearne House was being built, Mr and Mrs Ralston-Patrick lived for some time in Burnhouse Manor until the new house was ready for them. The original part of the hotel complex is a fine two story ashlar building with Tudoresque hood moulds and a gablet over the central window. The Robertson family occupied Burnhouse Manor in 1967.

Willow Park is a gated residential park in Burnhouse intended for the over 50s.

Old OS maps show that a toll house was located on the Dunlop road side of the crossroads on the Lochlibo Road, on the Laigh Gree Farm side; it was demolished circa 1935.

The Bungle Burn outflow from Blae Loch flows on down country from near Lochend, past the old mill site, Mossend and Tandlehill Farms, before making a confluence with the Lugton Water near the Bungleburn Bridge just outside Burnhouse. The Lugton Water forms the boundary to the east of Burnhouse between North Ayrshire and East Ayrshire.

The old farm of Laigh Auchengree stands nearby to Burnhouse. The old farmhouse has been incorporated into the byre and the Owl Hole has been blocked up.

== Micro-history ==
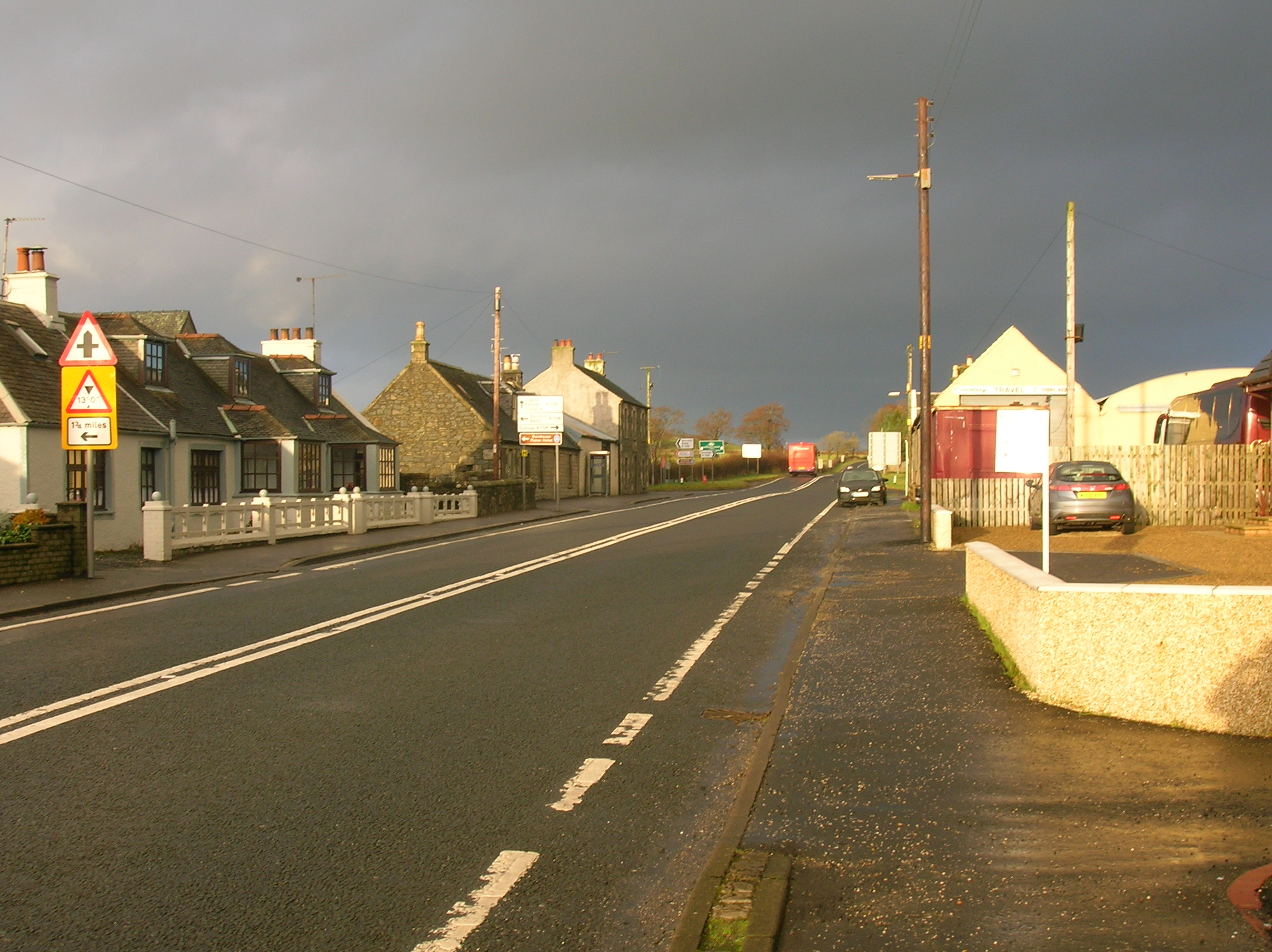
A view looking towards Lugton

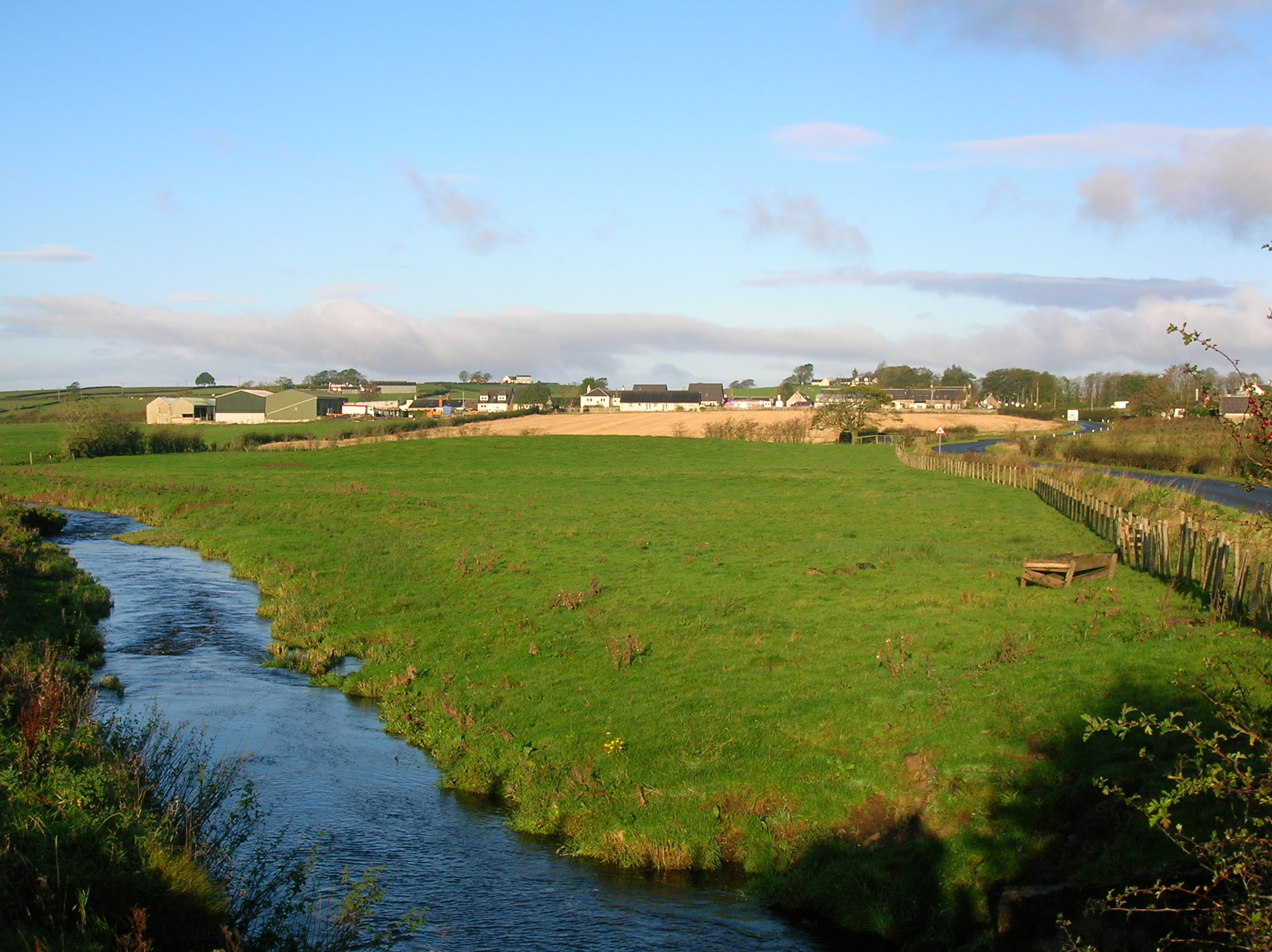
The village from near the Lugton Water.

The course of the Lugton Water was altered in 1830, including widening and straightening, the cost being £150, shared between the farm proprietors.

On 18 May 1894 Alexander Logan of Burnhouse was killed on the old turnpike road when he was crushed by a traction engine he was accompanying. Alexander was employed as a forerunner by Mr King and the accident happened when he tried to pass between the wheels of the loaded wagon that the engine was pulling. Dr Syson from Beith rode out to record the death, which must have been instantaneous. Matthew Anderson, the local Barrmill "Policeman Poet", wrote a poem in the boy's memory.

This is an extract:

"This little lad so anxious,
Had tried to pass between,
The engine and the waggon,
When, oh! the awful scene."

In 2012 the village was home to several businesses, including Halley's caravan sales, Robert Wilson agricultural supplies, and Courtney coach hire.

The village lies within Barrmill and District Community Association's area and is also covered by Beith Community Council.

In 2013 the Barrmill Conservation Group put up a community notice board and placed a flower tub on the site of the telephone box that had been removed shortly before.

== See also ==
- Barrmill, North Ayrshire
- Broadstone Castle and Barony, Ayrshire
- Barony and Castle of Giffen
- Speir's school
- Giffen railway station
- Lands of Bogston
- Greenhills, North Ayrshire
