= Auchenharvie Colliery =

Auchenharvie Colliery was a colliery formerly located in the Auchenharvie area of Stevenston, Ayrshire, Scotland that was devastated by a pit disaster on 2 August 1895 in which nine people died.

== List of the deceased ==
- John Clauchan (35)
- William Clauchan (56) This age date for William is in error: Please see record attached for ages of Glachan brothers at death 2-6 August 1895

1895 Death Certificate Name of Parish/District Stevenston Parish/District Number 615 Entry No 85 Surname Glauchan Mother's Name Helen Name(s) William and Surname Glauchan Age 28 Mother's Occupation Occupation Coalminer Alive / deceased? Sex M Maiden Surname Walker Date of Death between 2 - 6 August 1895 Cause of Death Pit disaster Time of Death Place of Death Auchinharvie Colliery, Stevenston Medical Attendant Usual Residence Name of Informant C Glauchan (if different from Relationship Widow above) to Deceased Marital Status Married Residence of Above Townhead St Name of Spouse(s) Catherine Kerr (if different) Stevenston Fathers Name James Date and Place 22/8/1895 and Surname Glauchan of Registration Stevenston Father's Occupation Coalminer Registrar John Dickie Alive / deceased? Deceased Other information

Record of Corrected entries. Sept 30 1895 The Auchenharvie Mine Disaster 1895 On Friday 2 August 1895 a disaster occurred at No 4 pit in which nine people died and five men were rescued after being entombed from the Friday morning until Sunday afternoon. This disaster was caused by the breaking through of water from the old workings to the east of the Capon Craig Gaw. This ' Gaw ' was supposed never to have been cut. It would appear, however, that at some former period it must have been pierced for about 3 p.m. on that day an outburst of water suddenly took place in the extreme rise of No 4. One of the sad features of the disaster was the loss it entailed on two families, one of which named GLAUCHAN lost four members while the other, named Mullen, lost two. The Deceased were:- Robert Conn aged 16 of Grange Street, Stevenston. Duncan Gallagher aged 32 of Schoolwell Street - brother -in - law to the Glauchans - left 5 children. 4 members of the Glauchan family of Townhead Street, Stevenston, John aged 30, WILLIAM AGE 26YRS, James aged 19, and Henry aged 17. John McGee - aged 14 Brothers James 19 and Peter 14 Mullen both of Schoolwell Street, Stevenston The miners that survived entombment were:- Charles Clark, Station Square, Stevenston, age 21 William Hamilton aged 22 Alexander Macadam, Old Square, Stevenston age 38 brother in law of Michael McCarroll, Ardeer Square, aged 40 Robert Park, New Street

- James Clauchan (21)
- Henry Clauchan (18)
- Duncan Gallacher (31)
- James Mullen (19)
- Peter Mullen (14)
- Robert McConn (18)
- John McGhee (14)

== Trivia ==
The event has been immortalised in the poem "The Star of Young McGhee".
