= Girgenti House =

Coordinates: 55.6582°N 4.6005°W

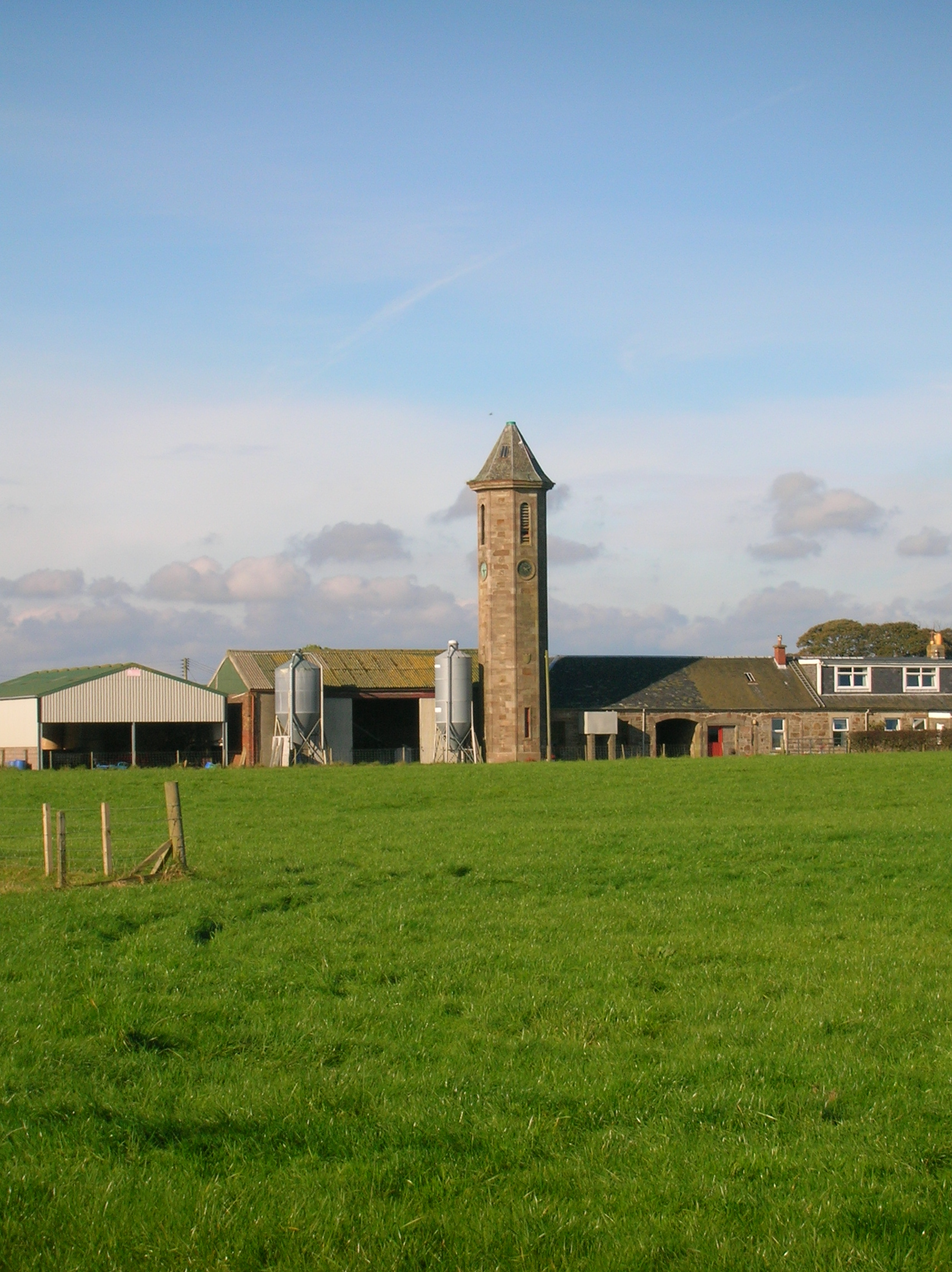
The Girgenti clocktower and the farm

Girgenti House (OS grid reference: NS 36502 43575) was a small, rather eccentric mansion built on part of the old Barony of Bonshaw in the parish of Stewarton, East Ayrshire, Scotland.

== History ==
=== Bonnyton ===
Bonnyton, a part of the Barony of Bonshaw, had belonged to the Reids of Stacklawhill and also to several generations of the Watts family, who were joiners and cartwrights. Born there was Doctor Robert Watt, the eminent Scotsman who published the Bibliotheca Britannica in 1824, shortly before he died; it records more than 200,000 books, pamphlets and periodicals printed from 1450 to the early nineteenth century and took him 25 years to compile. His portrait hangs in the entrance hall of the Royal Faculty of Physicians and Surgeons of Glasgow, and his direct descendants still live in the Stewarton area.

=== Girgenti House ===
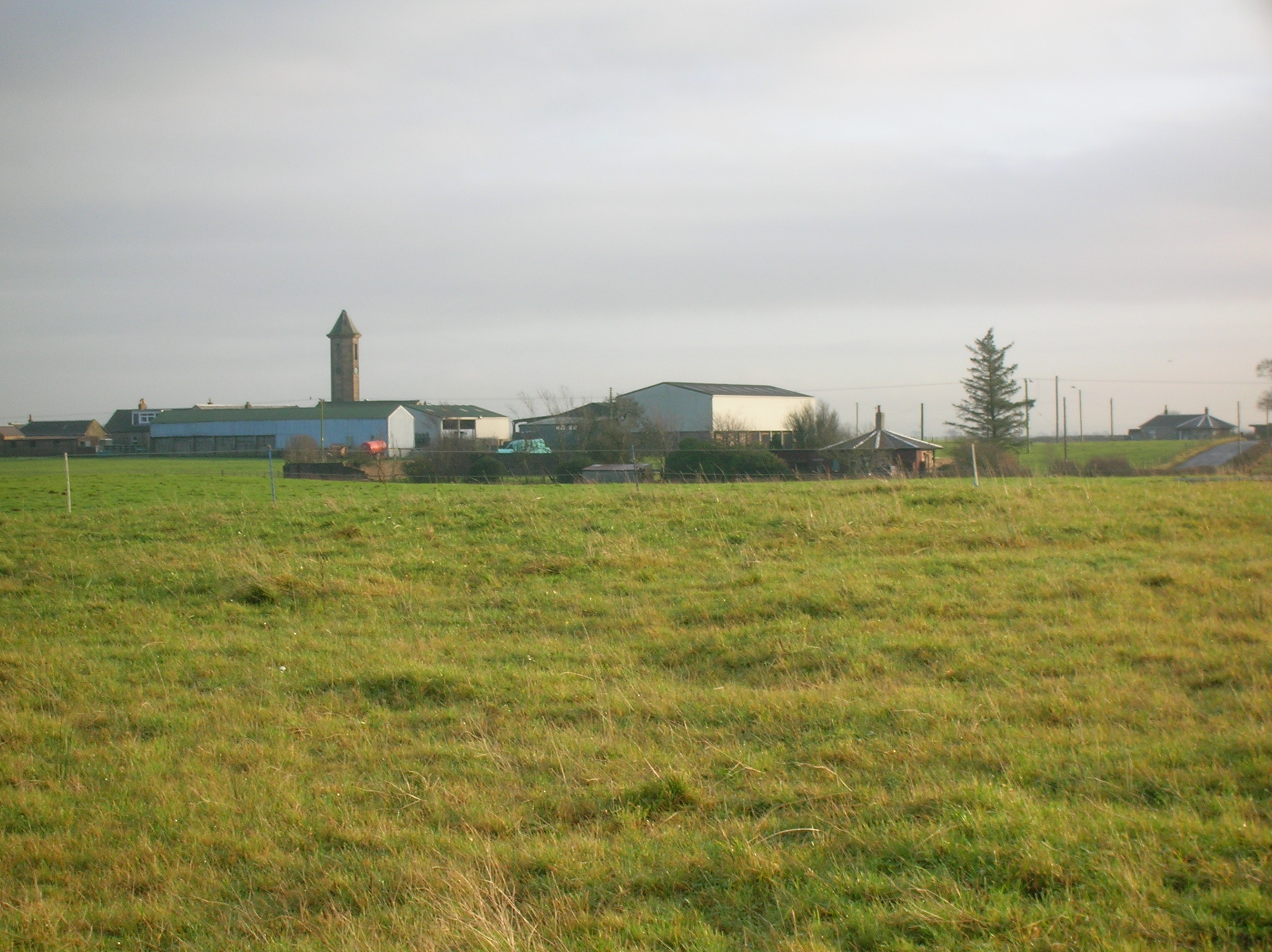
View of the farm, tower and lodges from near Torranyard

Captain John Cheape, the builder of Girgenti House, belonged to a Fife family represented by George C. Cheape, Esq., of Strathtyrum, and was the seventh son of James Cheape, Esq., of Sauchie, in Clackmannanshire. He was in the Scots Fusilier Guards and had served in the Napoleonic Wars.

Bonnyton (not Muirhead as sometimes stated) was renamed Girgenti by the well-travelled Captain Cheape, perhaps in honour of a visit to the ancient Greek ruins of Agrigentum (the name of the town has become Girgenti in modern Sicilian). In 1827 he paid Thomas Reid £1350 for the property, totalling 50 Scotch acres, and at a cost of £6000 he demolished the old Bonnyton farm steading and built a rather eccentric mansion house and offices and planted extensive plantations and shrubberies on what had been a wild moss-land. It is not known what brought him to the area or why he chose such a comparatively desolate site. Moorhead is the original name given in the Lainshaw Register of Sasines for Girgenti. A clue to his acquisition of these moss lands lies in the fact that The Royal Horticultural and Agricultural Society of Scotland awarded Cheape with an Honorary Silver Medal in 1833 for his publication entitled "Cultivation of Land by Manual Labour."

Cheape had been an ensign in the 44th Regiment of Foot, then joined the 98th Regiment and next moving as a captain to the Royal Glasgow Regiment of Foot, 1800 saw him in the 3rd Regiment of Foot Guards and in 1803 he retired.

Cheape lived at Girgenti for the last twenty years of his life (1829–1850) after leaving the army. The house had a pillared portico and was basically single-storeyed in appearance, with bays, a capped tower and dormer windows on two different levels; it had a large summer house. A conservatory was present and a sunken eight roomed storey for servants.

The OS maps show associated buildings—presumably the mains or home farm and a coach house, stables, and so forth. The National Archives of Scotland hold a map of the estate made in 1845, surveyed by John Fairlie.

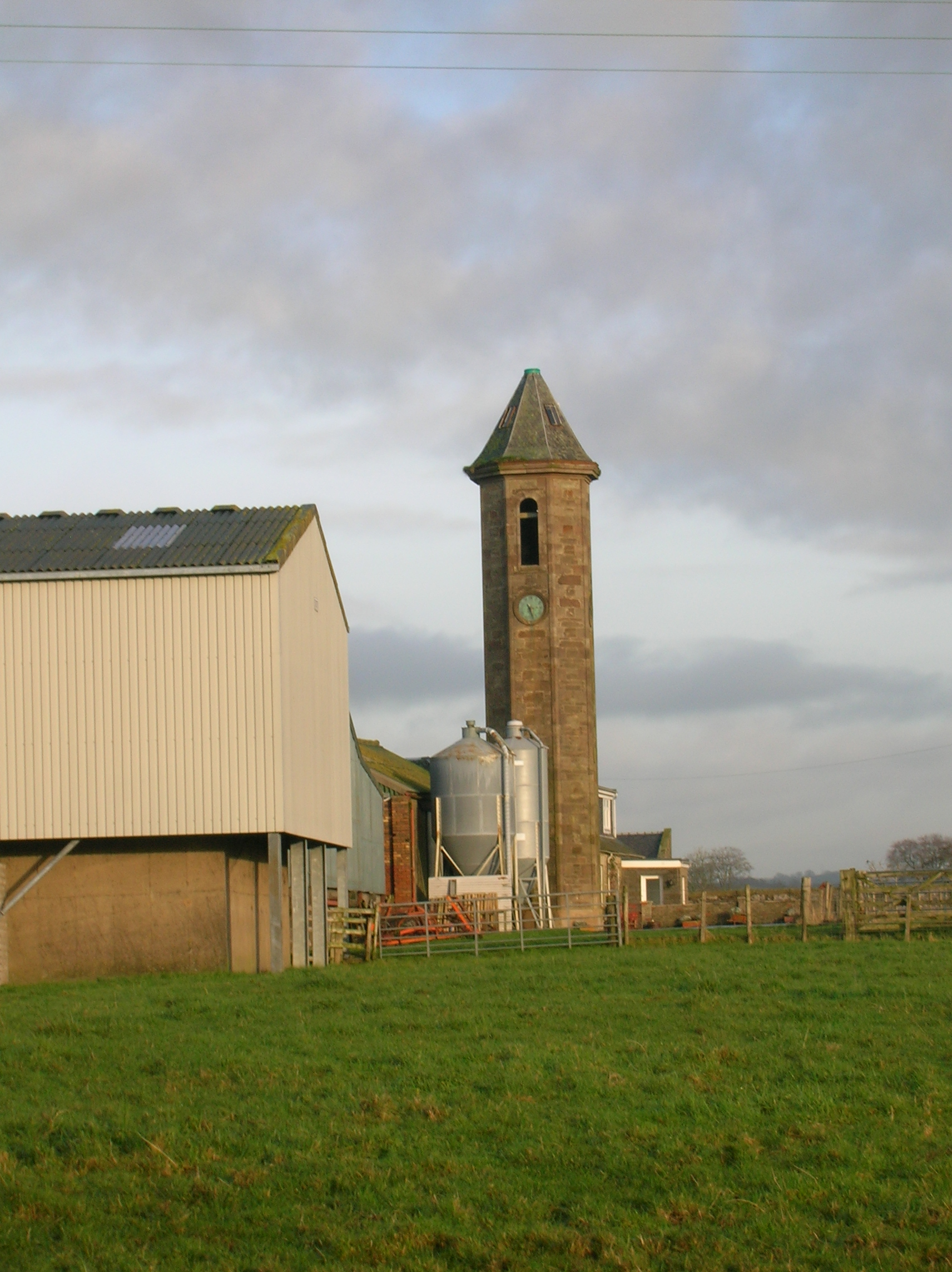
The tower

Cheape died unmarried at Girgenti on 10 February 1850, aged 76, leaving James McAlister of Kennox to administer the lands of Girgenti. The estate was sold to benefit a number of infirmaries across Scotland (Glasgow, Edinburgh, Aberdeen, Inverness and Dundee). He was buried in the Laigh Kirk, Stewarton. Cheape's only sister, Marianne, who was first married to Sir Alexander Campbell of Ardkinglass in 1792, became the third wife of Thomas, 11th Earl of Strathmore and Kinghorne in 1817; their residence was Glamis Castle (where the Queen Mother would spend a great deal of her childhood and where Princess Margaret was born). She was to have inherited Girgenti; however, she predeceased her brother.

=== Cheape's tower ===
Cheape is said to have believed in reincarnation, or transmigration of the soul, and to have been so convinced that he would return in the form of a bird that next to his mansion house he built a large tower with an octagonal roof, housing a dovecote on top. Finished in 1843, it stands 80 feet (24 m) tall, has four clock faces, his family coat of arms and a motto—Didus Fructus ("Let it spread its fruit abroad")—all on the outer surfaces. A shield on the tower records that it was "Designed and built by Captain John Cheape, 1843".

A local tale is that Captain Cheape was in league with smugglers and would light a lamp in the top of the tower when he knew the coast was clear. The nearby ruins of Auchenharvie Castle and Darnshaw Farm are linked to stories of smuggling corpses for dissection by Glasgow medical students. The tower bears a striking resemblance to the typical Italian 'Campanile' and this may reflect his interest in the Italian culture as indicated by the name 'Girgenti'. He is also said to have constructed the tower to be able see the ocean and finally the celebration of his 70th birthday could be the explanation for this folly.

== Later owners and residents of Girgenti House ==
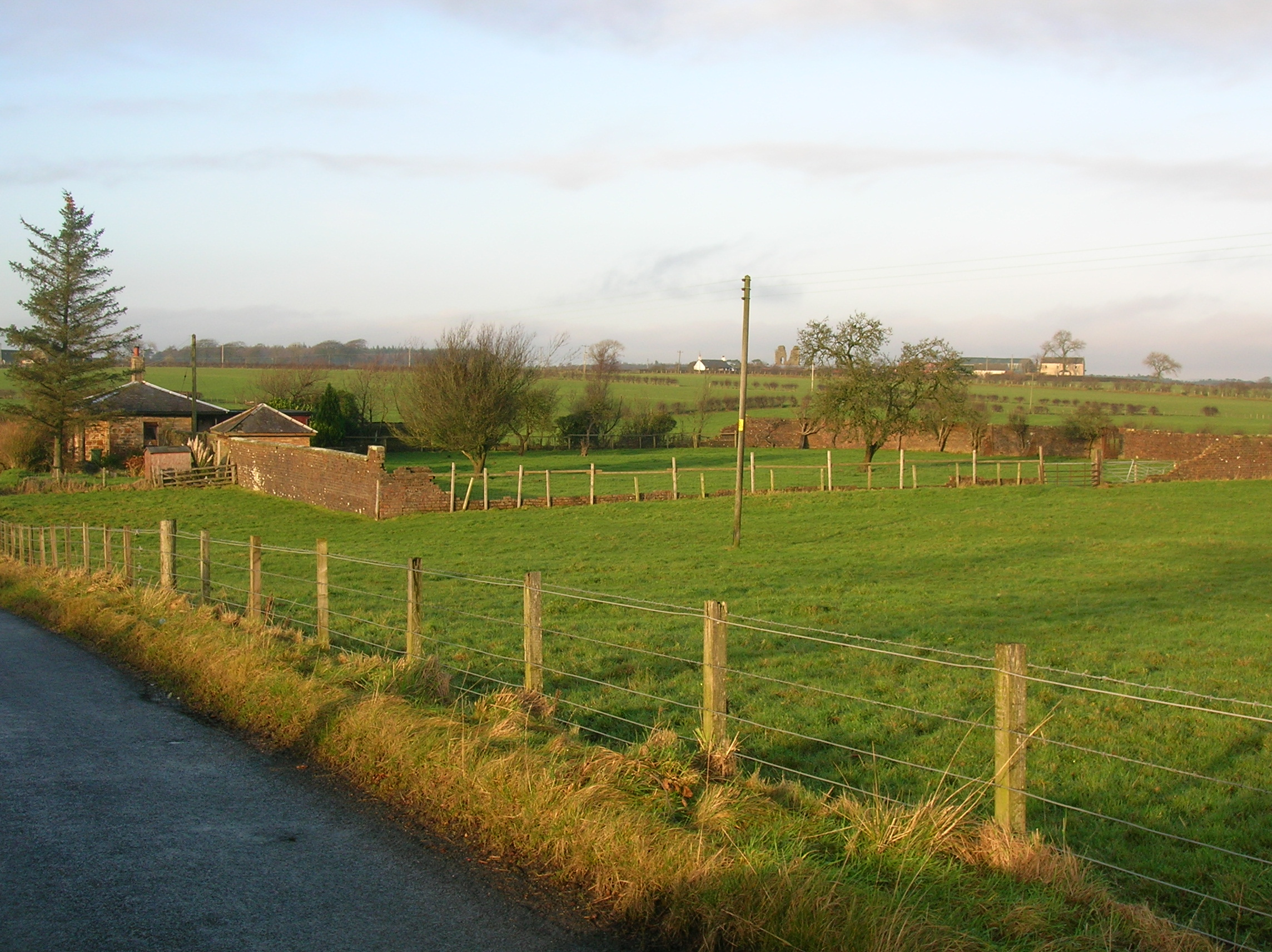
The West Lodge and remains of the old walled garden

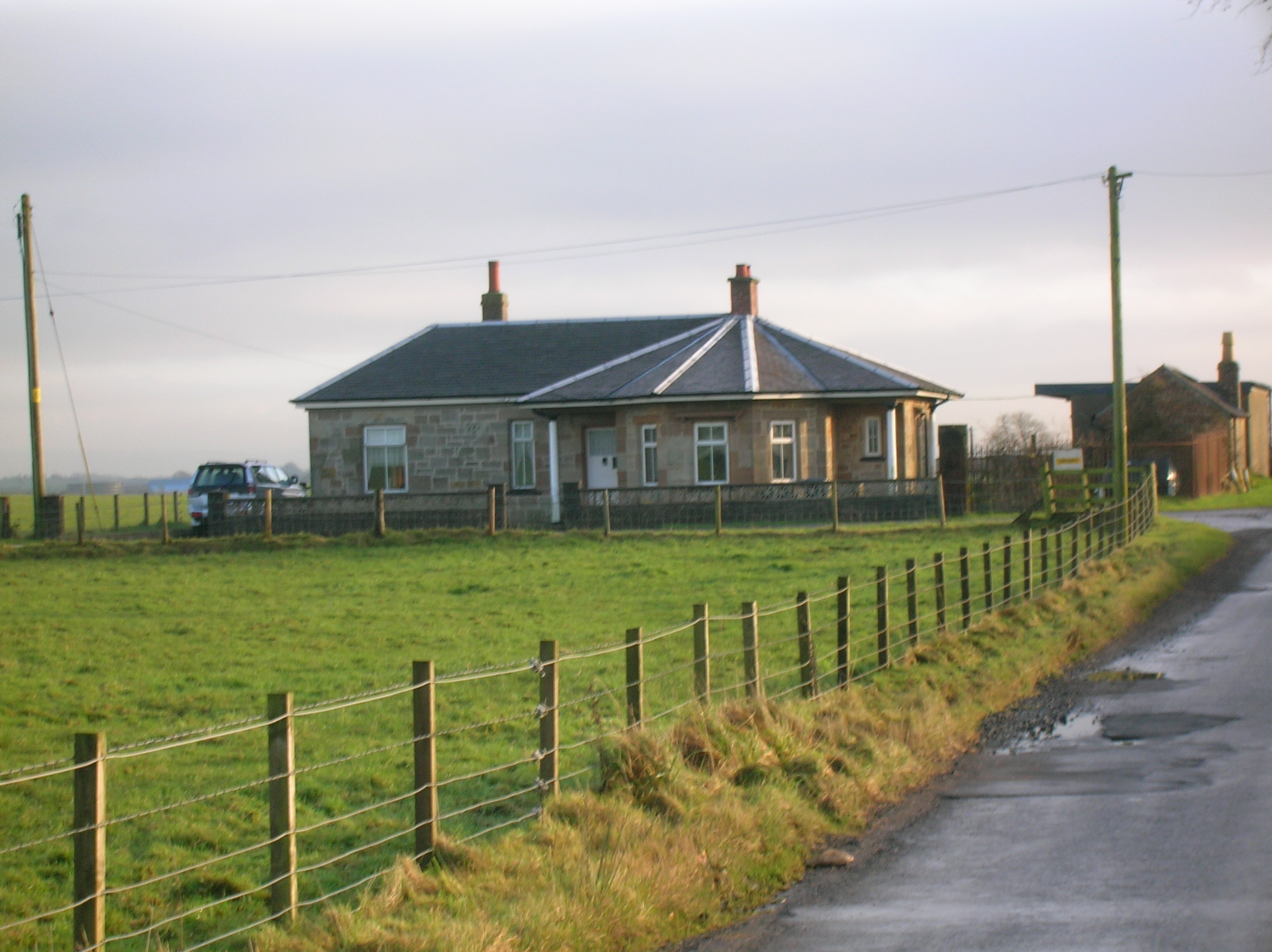
The East Lodge

William Broom, an ironmaster in Glasgow, purchased the estate, after which it passed into the hands of Alexander Cochrane of Verreville in Lanarkshire. The estate was later purchased by a Glasgow businessman, Allan Gilmour of Eaglesham, for private use. The 1881 census records the coachman's house as being occupied by James Young of Glasgow and his wife, mother and six children. Christina Fergusson is recorded as a laundress living in the mansion house, as well as a Janetta R. Moffat from Dingwall.

In 1900 it was sold to Glasgow Corporation for use as a reformatory for female inebriates, which opened in January 1901. (That by 1903 seventy-one inmates had been treated there, with about forty-three in residence on the average, shows the scale of the condition at that time.) It had initially been intended for both men and women but became solely for women in 1901, with most of the committed women being paupers, about half of whom had been convicted for prostitution.

After less than 10 years as a reformatory, the estate was sold again and transformed into a privately owned training centre for homeless boys between the ages of 14 and 20. It was next sold to the Scottish Labour Colony Association, which continued its use as a training centre. In 1918 it changed hands yet again, and this time it returned to farm use. The owner was now a Mr Muir, who was a great-grandson of the Thomas Reid of Stacklawhill from whom Cheape had purchased the estate in 1827.

The farm was next sold in 1932 to Mr Sword, chairman of the Western SMT Company, who took considerable interest in the outbuildings and had the tower restored and the clock repaired. The two Italianate lodges, East and West, survive, together with part of the walled garden; the house itself was demolished in the 1940s. The farm steading is mainly original; a cottage is also present. A Mr and Mrs Smith owned and worked the farm from around 1960.

== Gallery ==
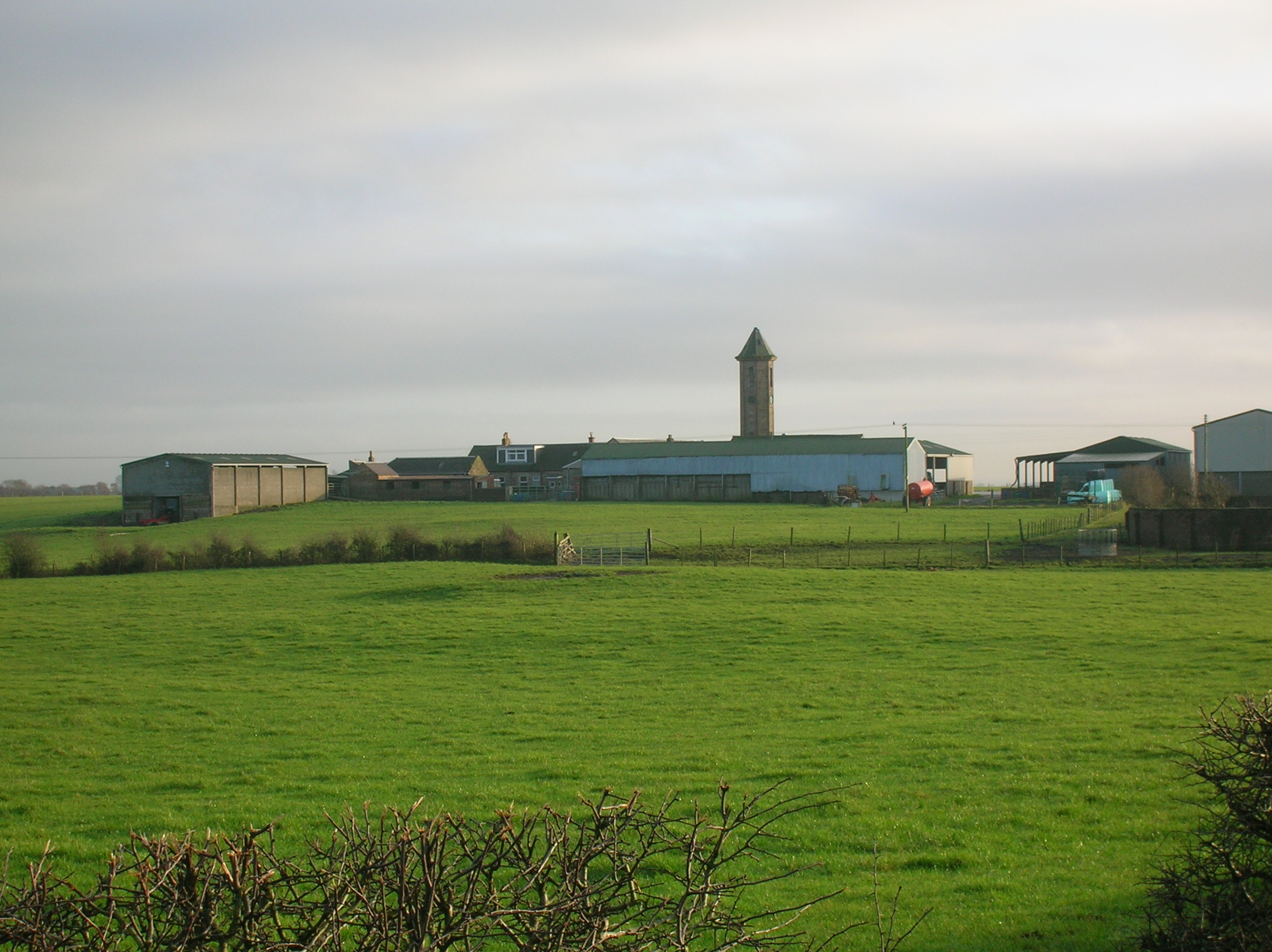
Distant view of the tower and farm buildings

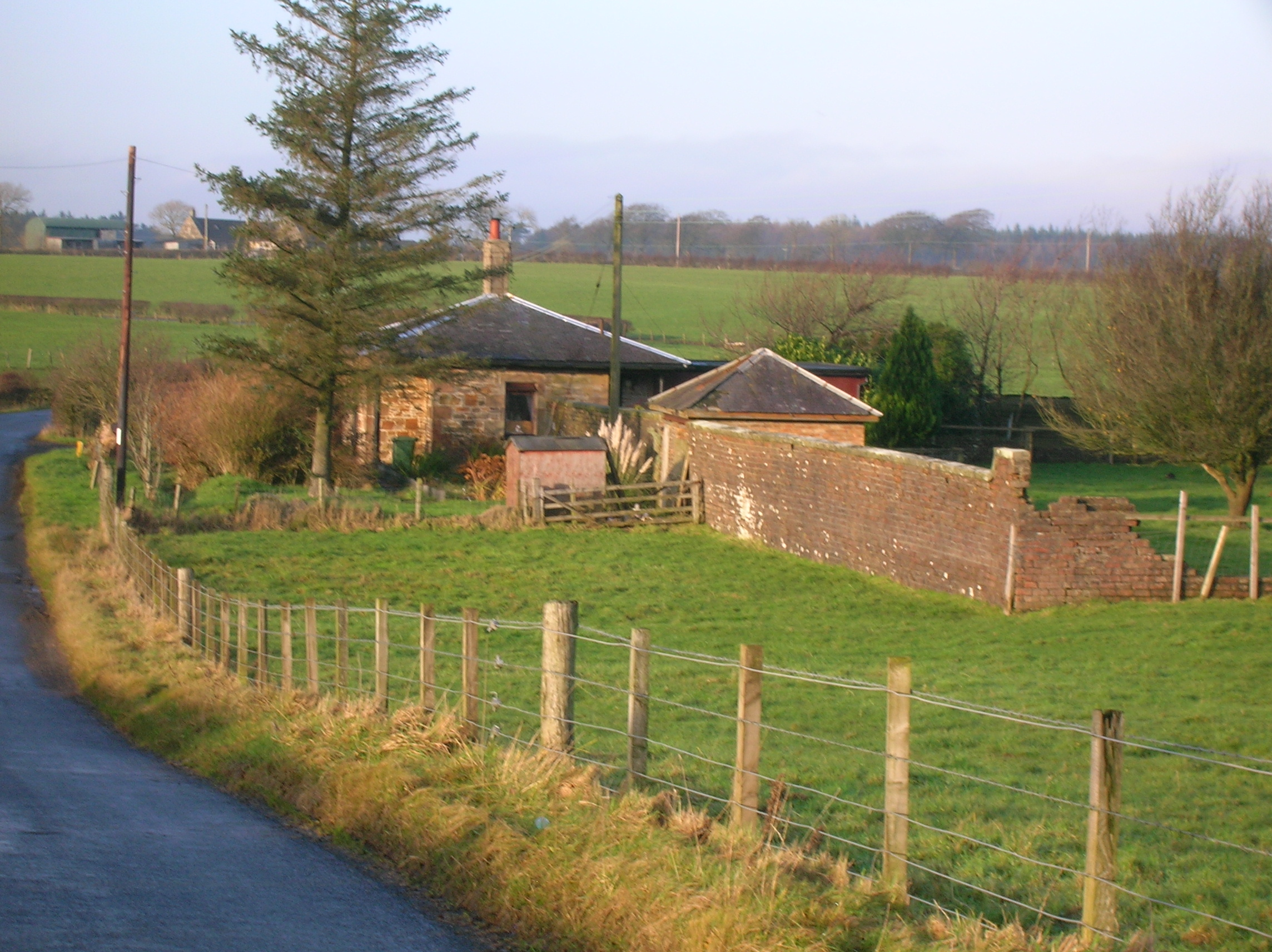
The West Lodge

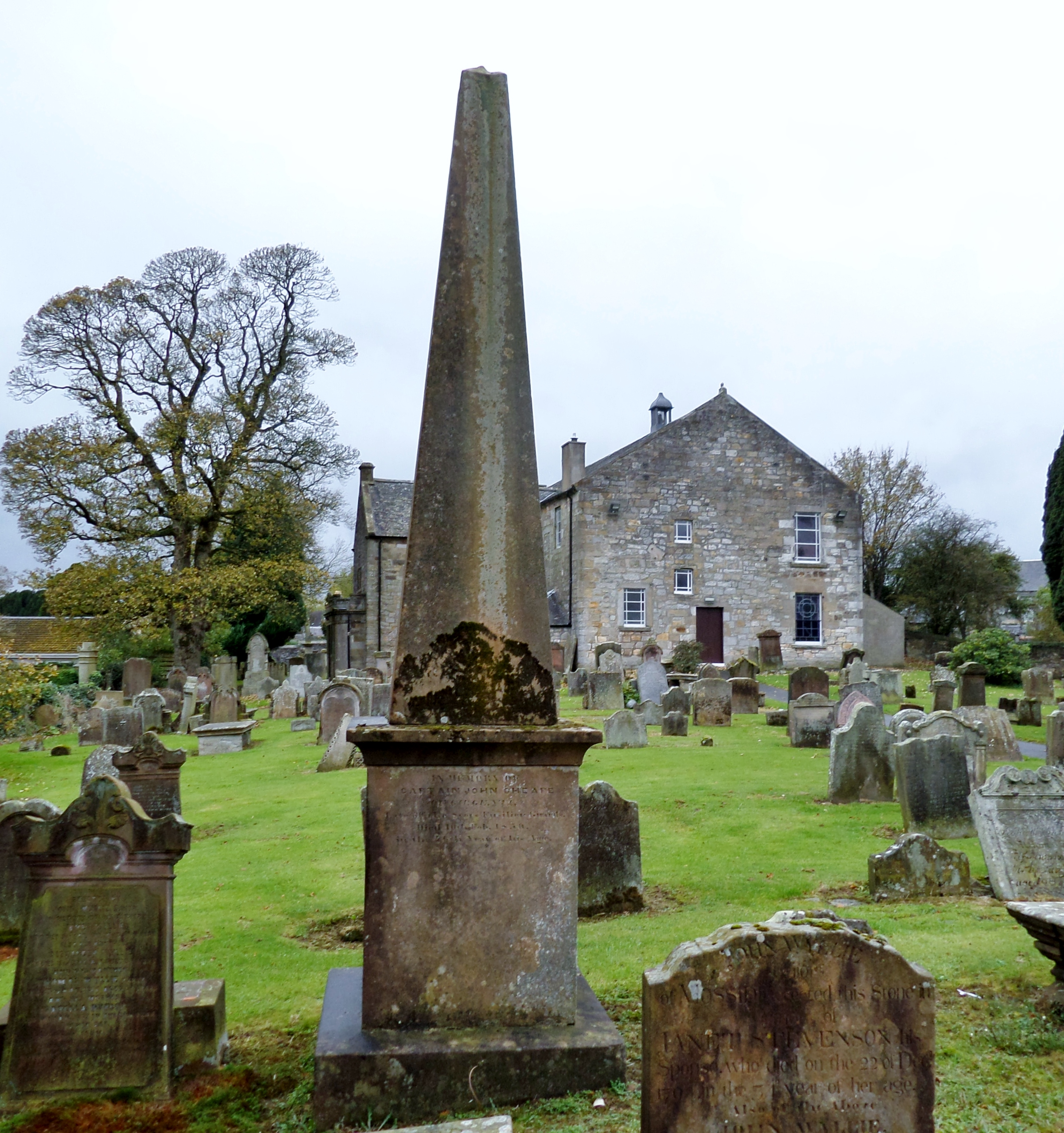
Captain Cheape's Gravestone in Stewarton

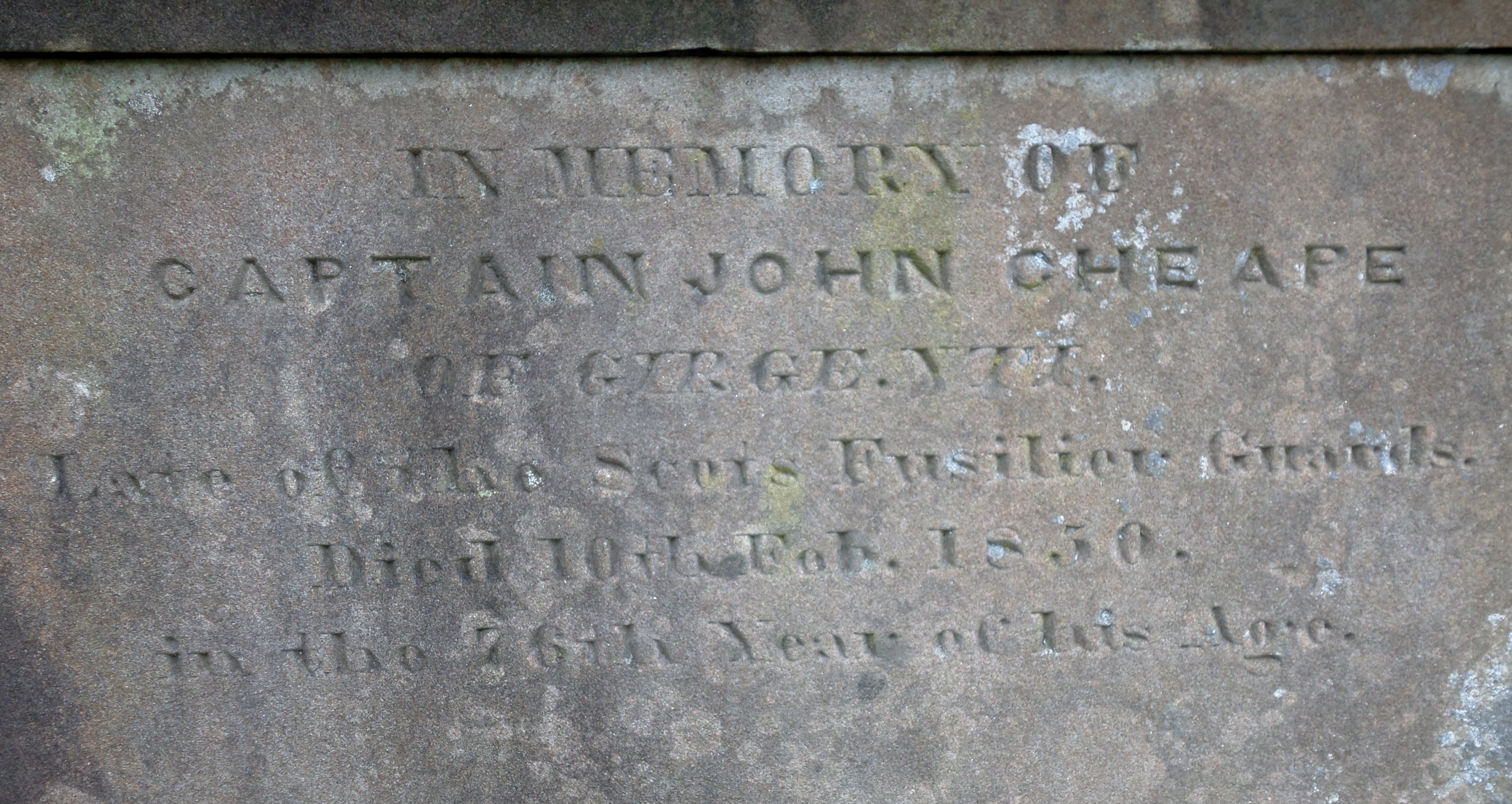
The inscription, Laigh Kirk, Stewarton

== See also ==
- Auchenharvie Castle
