= Torranyard =

Coordinates: 55.662°N 4.613°W

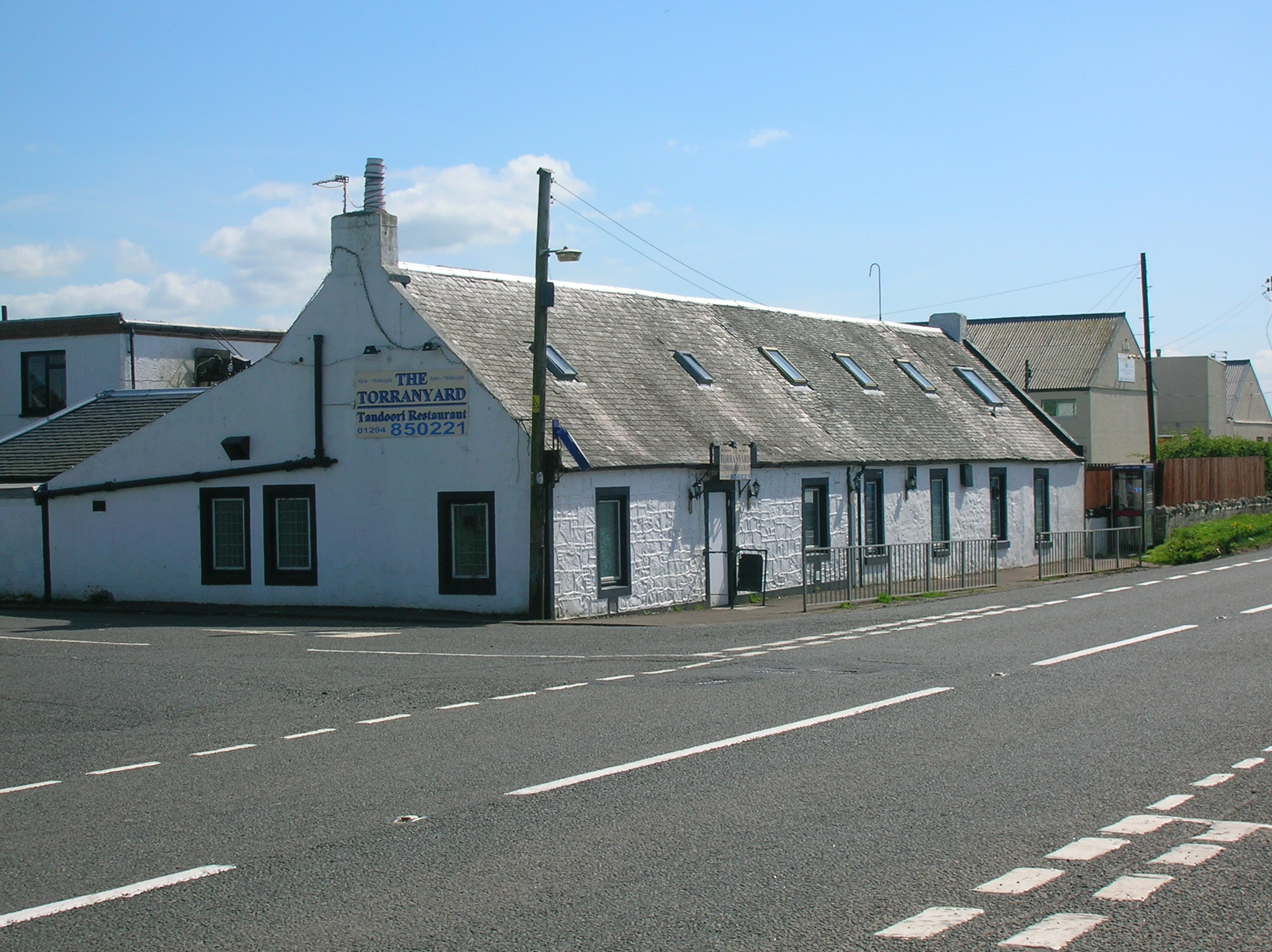
- The Torranyard Inn

- Location within North Ayrshire
- OS grid reference: NS 35740 44019
- Council area: North Ayrshire
- Lieutenancy area: Ayrshire and Arran
- Country: Scotland
- Sovereign state: United Kingdom
- Police: Scotland
- Fire: Scottish
- Ambulance: Scottish
- UK Parliament: Central Ayrshire
- Scottish Parliament: Cunninghame South

Torranyard is a small village or hamlet in North Ayrshire, Parish of Kilwinning, Scotland. It lies between the settlements of Auchentiber and Irvine on the A736 Lochlibo Road.

== History ==
Torranyard is a hamlet at what is now a crossroads on the Irvine to Glasgow A736 'Lochlibo Road', previous to the main road's construction, circa 1820, it sat on the toll road that ran from Kilwinning and Irvine via Benslie to Glasgow, passing Loch Libo at Uplawmoor en route.

Roy's map of 1747 records the settlement of 'Turringyard' near Auchenharvie Castle . The 1897 25 inch to the mile OS map records a 'Tour Inn' opposite the old Torranyard Toll, now the Torranyard Tabdoori. It was recorded as 'Turnyard' in 1775, 'Tirranyard' on Thomson's 1820 map and in 1832. The Montgreenan estate is nearby and the site of the old Girgenti house and surviving tower are nearby on the Cunninghamhead road.

The meaning of 'Tour' in Scots is 'Tower', as in the prominent Auchenharvie castle tower nearby. A Yard in Scots is a garden. 'Torranyard' could therefore be a corruption of 'Tour Inn yard.' Local people still pronounce the name 'Torranyard' as 'TOURanyard'.

Jamieson records that the inn at Burnhouse was nicknamed the 'Trap 'Em Inn', the one at Lugton was called the 'Lug 'Em Inn', that at Auchentiber the 'Cleek 'Em Inn', and finally the one at Torranyard was called the 'Turn 'Em Out.'

=== The Resurrectionists ===
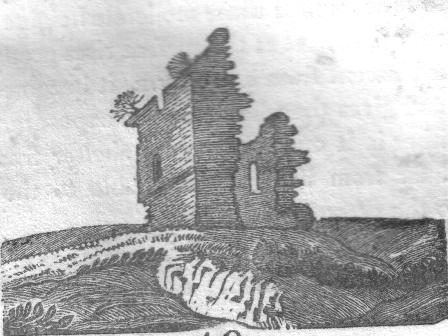
Auchenharvie Castle in 1820

A local legend is that in the days of the 'body snatchers' or 'resurrectionists'; before the Anatomy Act 1832, bodies obtained locally were hidden in the ruins of the nearby Auchenharvie Castle before being taken up to Glasgow at night to sell to the surgeons and medical students at the old university. Another version of the story states that the bodies were collected together from neighbouring parishes at Darnshaw, a remote house near Bloak Moss on the old Auchenharvie to Megswell toll road route. The old toll road did run past the site and a toll gate and house stood fairly close by which must cast some doubt on the castle being involved. Jamieson records the story that tramps were lured to their deaths at the inns along this road by 'body snatchers' and as evidence it is recorded that when the Cleikum Inn at Auchentiber was demolished a large collection of walking sticks were found.

== Micro-history ==
A William Forgisal (Fergushill) of Torranyard was miner at the Doura Pit in the 18th century. He lost his leg in a mining accident, as had his father. William's wife was a tough sort, her comment being on seeing him so encumbered, was that the Forgisals would need a small plantation of their own to keep them in crutches.

A Torranyard Farm is located to the north-west of the village.

Viewfield Manor Holiday Village is located behind the Torranyard Tandoori that faces the A736. the site was partly used as a refuse tip at one time as shown on OS maps.

Opencast workings and 'works' are shown on old OS maps nearby, close to the Greenacres Equestrian Centre (2012).
