= Greenhills, North Ayrshire =

Coordinates: 55.72351°N 4.589411°W

Greenhills
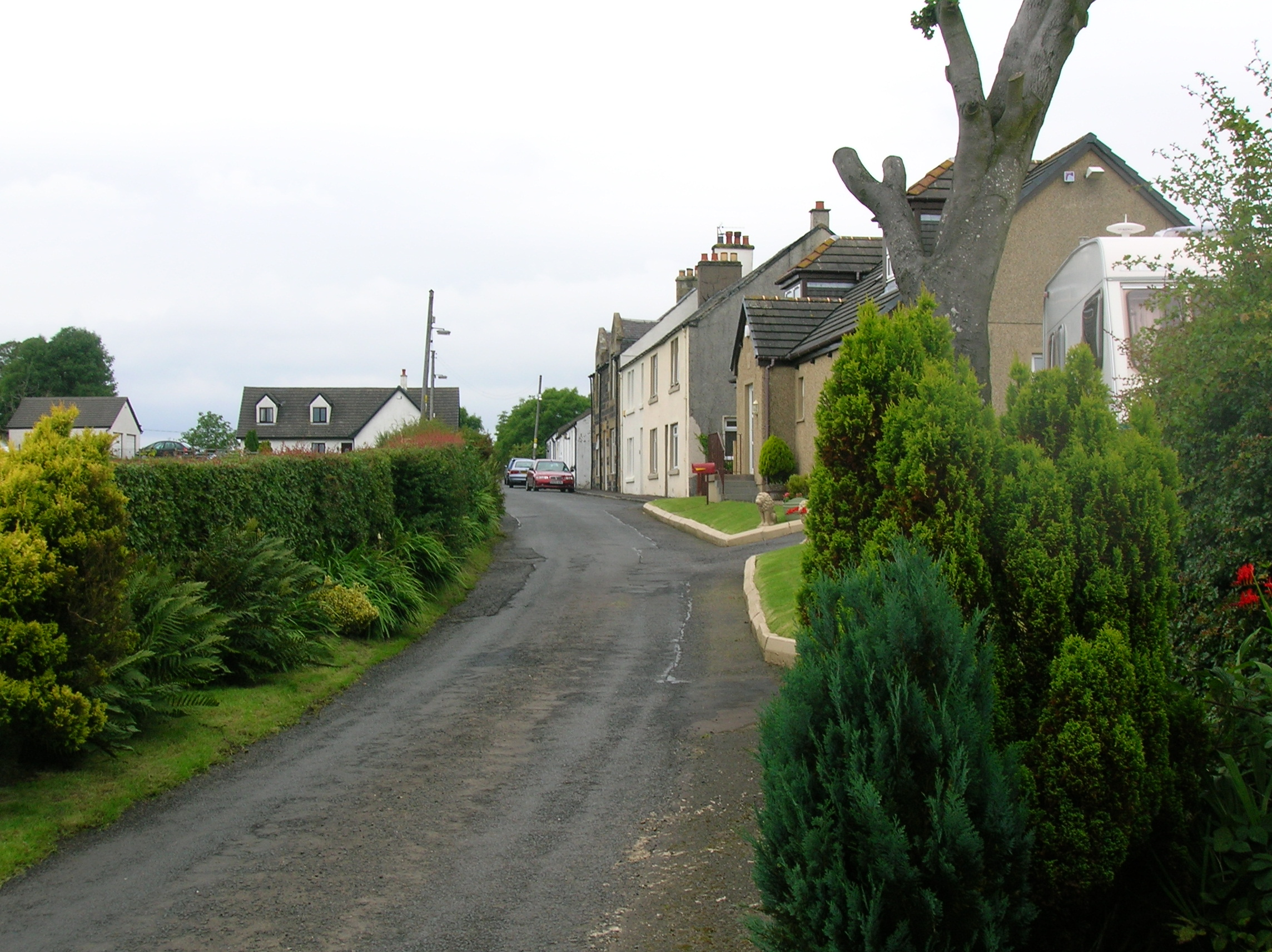
- The village mainstreet looking towards the main road

- Location within North Ayrshire
- OS grid reference: NS 37386 50820
- Council area: North Ayrshire
- Lieutenancy area: Ayrshire and Arran
- Country: Scotland
- Sovereign state: United Kingdom
- Dialling code: 01560
- Police: Scotland
- Fire: Scottish
- Ambulance: Scottish
- UK Parliament: Central Ayrshire
- Scottish Parliament: Cunninghame South

Greenhills is a small village or hamlet in North Ayrshire, Parish of Beith, Scotland. It lies between the settlements of Barrmill and the hamlet of Burnhouse on a crossroads of the B706 and the lanes to Nettlehirst and Tandlehill via the Third part. It is named after the 'Green Hill' an artificial mound, a Moot, Law or Justice hill that once stood here. The settlement lay within the old Barony of Giffen; the castle no longer exists. The village lies within Barrmill and District Community Association's area and is also covered by Beith Community Council.

== History ==
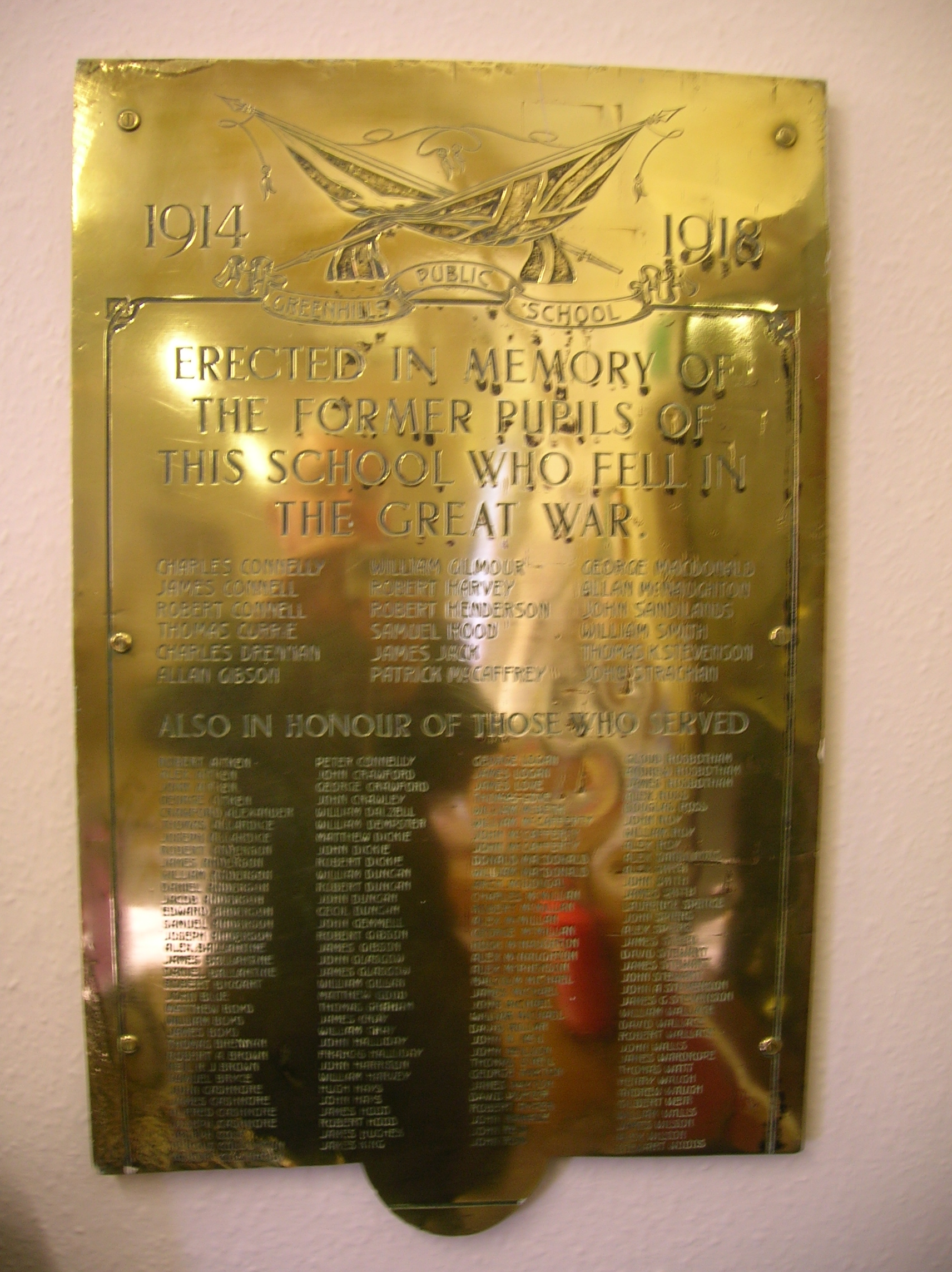
Greenhills Public School WW1 Memorial, now located at Barrmill.

This small settlement is shown on General Roy's survey of 1747 - 55, under the name of 'Greenhill' in the singular, and has two buildings indicating where the old school was situated.

=== The school ===
The school, built from Ballochmyle red sandstone, opened in the 1890s with Mr. Mudie as headteacher, at the time that Hessilhead School closed. A temporary building in the playground was used as a dining hall. It was built on the site of the cartwheel workshop and was midway between Burnhouse and Barrmill. Greenhills closed in 1959, it was sold in 1964 and demolished in the mid-1980s; having been used for some years as a glue factory by Strathbond Ltd who still trade from the Willowyard Estate, Beith. Mr McGregor was the last headteacher and the sports field had been the field lying across the Barrmill to Burnhouse Road. The Greenhills WRI originally met here, however after the school was demolished they moved to the Barrmill Community Centre.

=== Industry ===
A smithy stood at the crossroads on the Borestone farm side of the hamlet. John Marshall and Francis Douglas at this site made ploughs that sold all over the country, known as the Douglas Grubber. A joiner's shop stood next to the smithy, its machinery being driven by steam. The wheel wright's factory site was later used for the school and more recently a private dwelling. A limekiln was situated behind the school, made in the shape of a horseshoe with the opening facing the prevailing southwest wind. It was encased within a bank with a gap at the opening. A limestone quarry existed close to the school site.

=== The Moot or Justice Hill ===
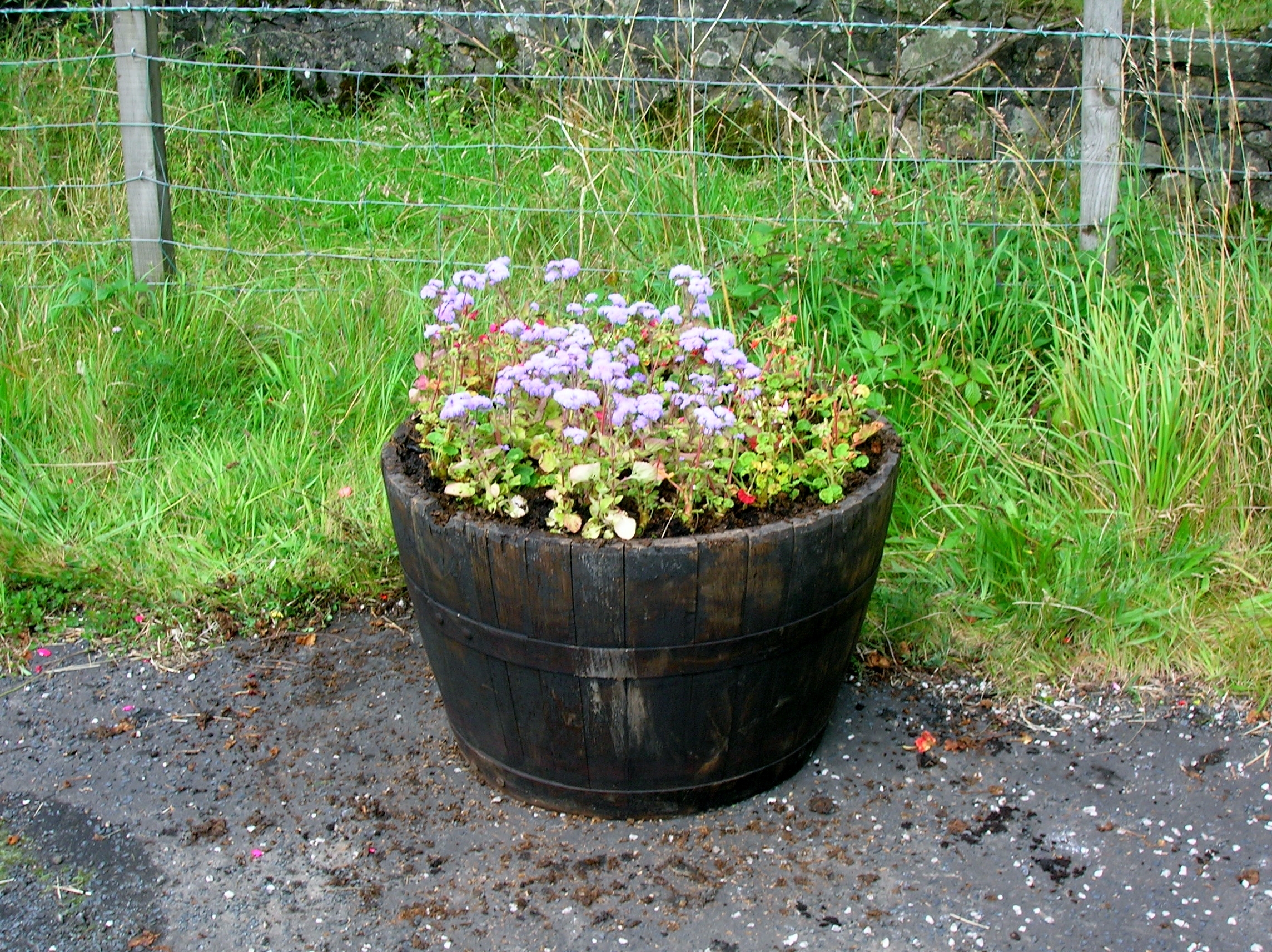
Flower tub at Greenhills installed and maintained by the Barrmill Conservation group.

This artificial mound or moot hill was the site where proclamations of the Giffen Castle Baronial Court's judgements were made. For serious crimes, the men were hung here and women were drowned in a pit that would have been nearby. This situation, known as the feudal Barony right of 'pit and gallows' existed at many other sites, such as at Beith, Kilmarnock, Aiket, Ardrossan, and Dalry. Often the mounds were wooded and a Dule Tree may have been used as the gallows. Brehons or Judges administered justice from 'Court Hills', especially in the highlands. Auchenmade had a Law Hill mound nearby, possibly destroyed by the railway. The 'Green Hill' stood near Greenhill farm. No sign of the moot hill seems to survive, however, a bridge near Greenhill is marked as 'Tappethillock', meaning a flat-topped hillock.

=== Cartographic evidence ===
Roy's map of 1747 records the settlement of Greenhill on the Beith to Burnhouse road. Armstrong's map of 1775 shows the ruins of Giffin castle only. The 1828 John Thomson's map gives the name 'Greenhills' and marks Haghead, Borestone, Bank, and Thirdpart in the vicinity.

== See also ==
- Broadstone Castle and Barony, Ayrshire
- Barony and Castle of Giffen
- Speir's school
- Giffen railway station
- Lands of Bogston
- Nettlehirst
- Burnhouse
