= Barrmill, North Ayrshire =

Village in North Ayrshire, Scotland

Coordinates: 55.729°N 4.601°W

Barrmill: Scottish Gaelic: Am Bàrr; Scots: The Barr
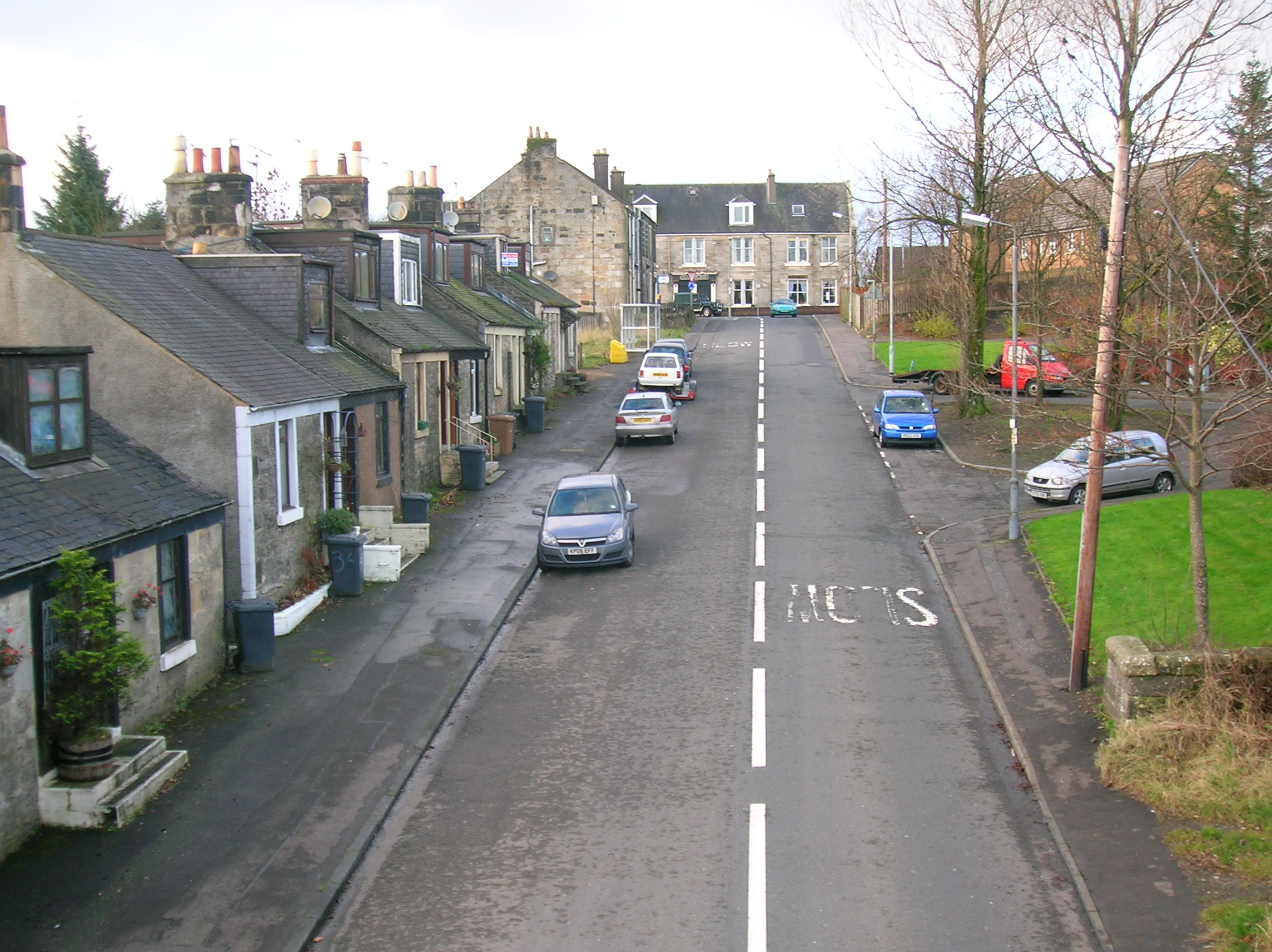
- Barrmill from the old railway bridge

- Location within North Ayrshire
- Council area: North Ayrshire
- Lieutenancy area: Ayrshire and Arran
- Country: Scotland
- Sovereign state: United Kingdom
- Post town: BEITH
- Postcode district: KA15
- Dialling code: 01505
- Police: Scotland
- Fire: Scottish
- Ambulance: Scottish
- UK Parliament: North Ayrshire and Arran
- Scottish Parliament: Cunninghame North

Barrmill is a small village in North Ayrshire, Scotland about 1 1/2 miles (2.5 kilometres) east of Beith on the road to Burnhouse and Lugton. Locally it is known as the Barr. It has a population of ~300.

== History ==
General Roy's survey of 1747–1755 shows only the farm of High Barr. A village grew up here due to the employment provided by the several limestone quarries that were present at one time, the Dockra Ironstone pit that was located near the railway line down from Dockra quarry in 1912, and other local industries.

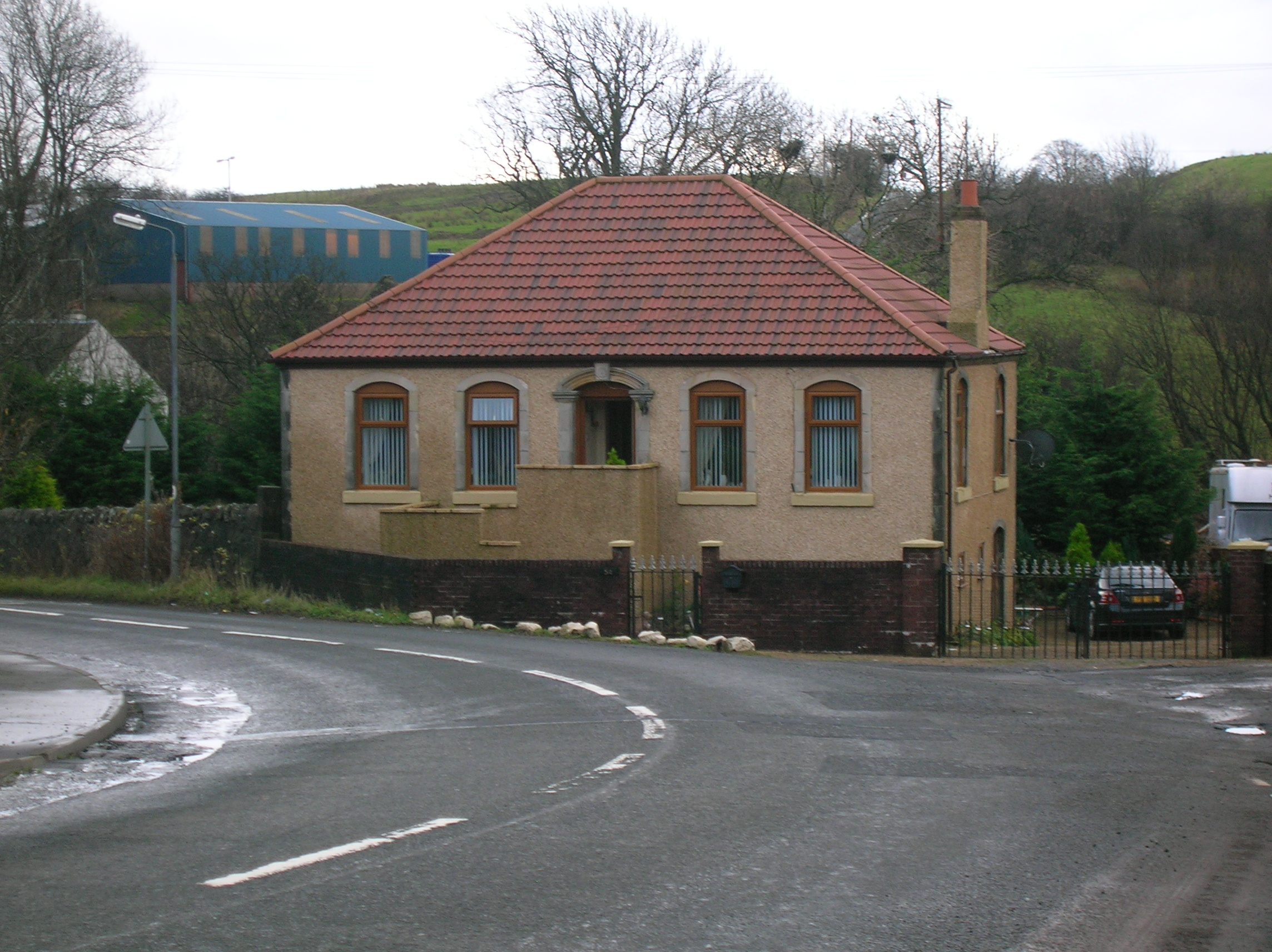
The old thread mill offices

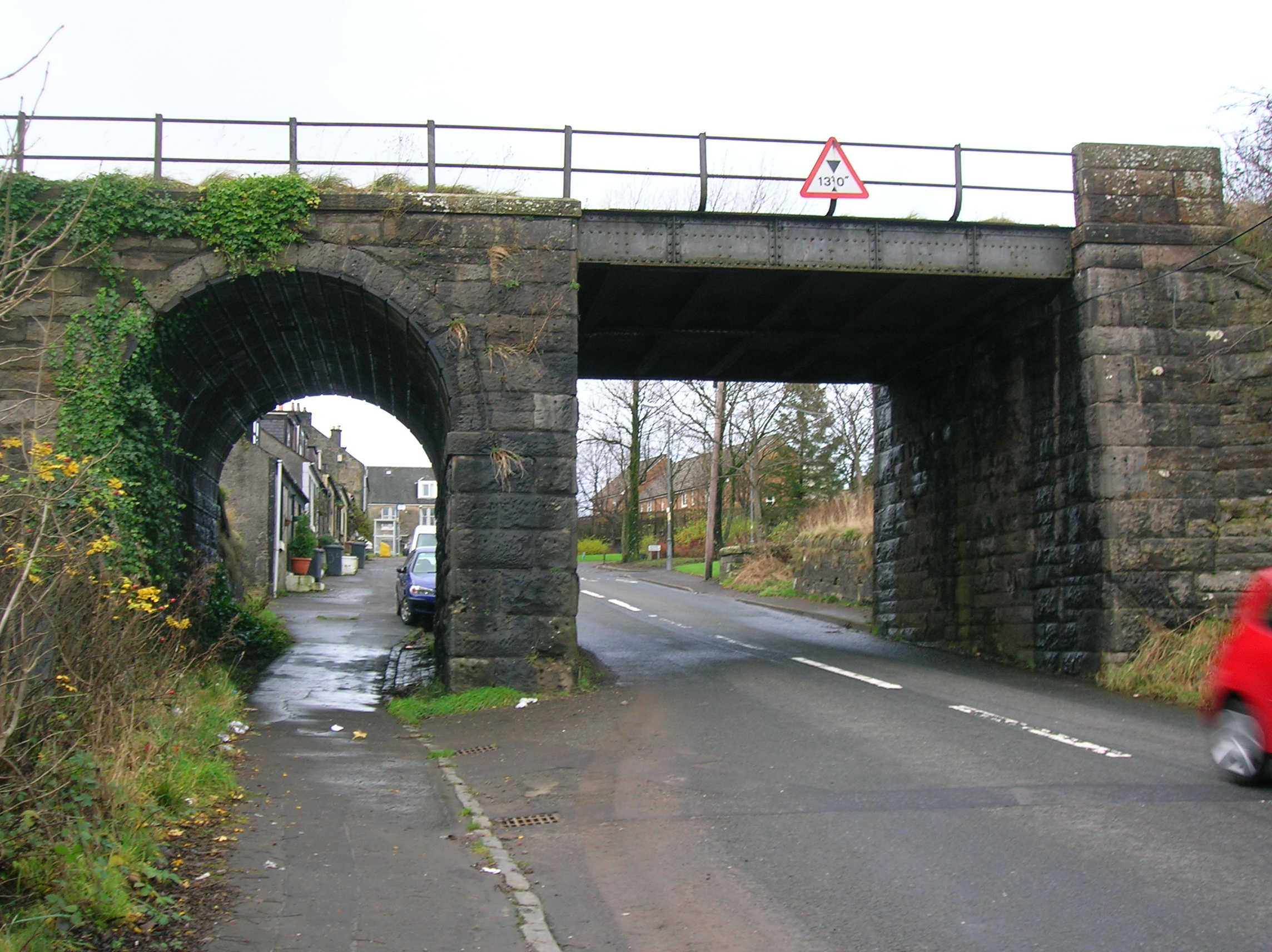
Barrmill from near the old mill offices. The wall to the left is the frontage of old mill workers' cottages.

The village that developed had a population of 300 in 1876 and 600 in 1951, when the threadmaking industry had just ceased, although the workers still lived in company houses and were transported daily to the threadmaking factory at Kilbirnie. This mill was founded in the mid-19th century to make linen thread, much used at the time for boot and shoe making, and for sailmaking; an offshoot of the much larger linen thread mills at Kilbirnie. The largest of the mill buildings was a three-storeyed, flat-roofed mill, with a fireproof interior with brick arches on cast iron columns. In front is a section of a range of single-storeyed, north-lit sheds. In 1965 the buildings were being used as a fertiliser factory. The mill buildings have been demolished, but the offices still survive.

The limestone works was closed in 1972. The whinstone quarries of Messrs. King & Co. employed a considerable number of men in 1951, but even then the quarries were almost worked out. Giffen coal pit (No 1) lay close to Bankhead Moss as shown on the 1897 OS map, closing not long afterwards as the following OS maps cease showing it.

The 1912 OS map marks the quoiting ground which was in what is now the park, close to the old railway embankment; a mission hall is also shown, located just the other side of the railway bridge over the Beith branchline. In 2006 a new housing estate/street was created on the site of the old Barrmill railway station and goods yard.

Birsieknowe was in the grounds of what is now DM Beith (2010) and the old coal pit here closed due to flooding beyond the capacity of the pumps in 1913; it had been active in the 1890s. A commemorative plaque was placed at the site.

== Barrmill Railway station ==
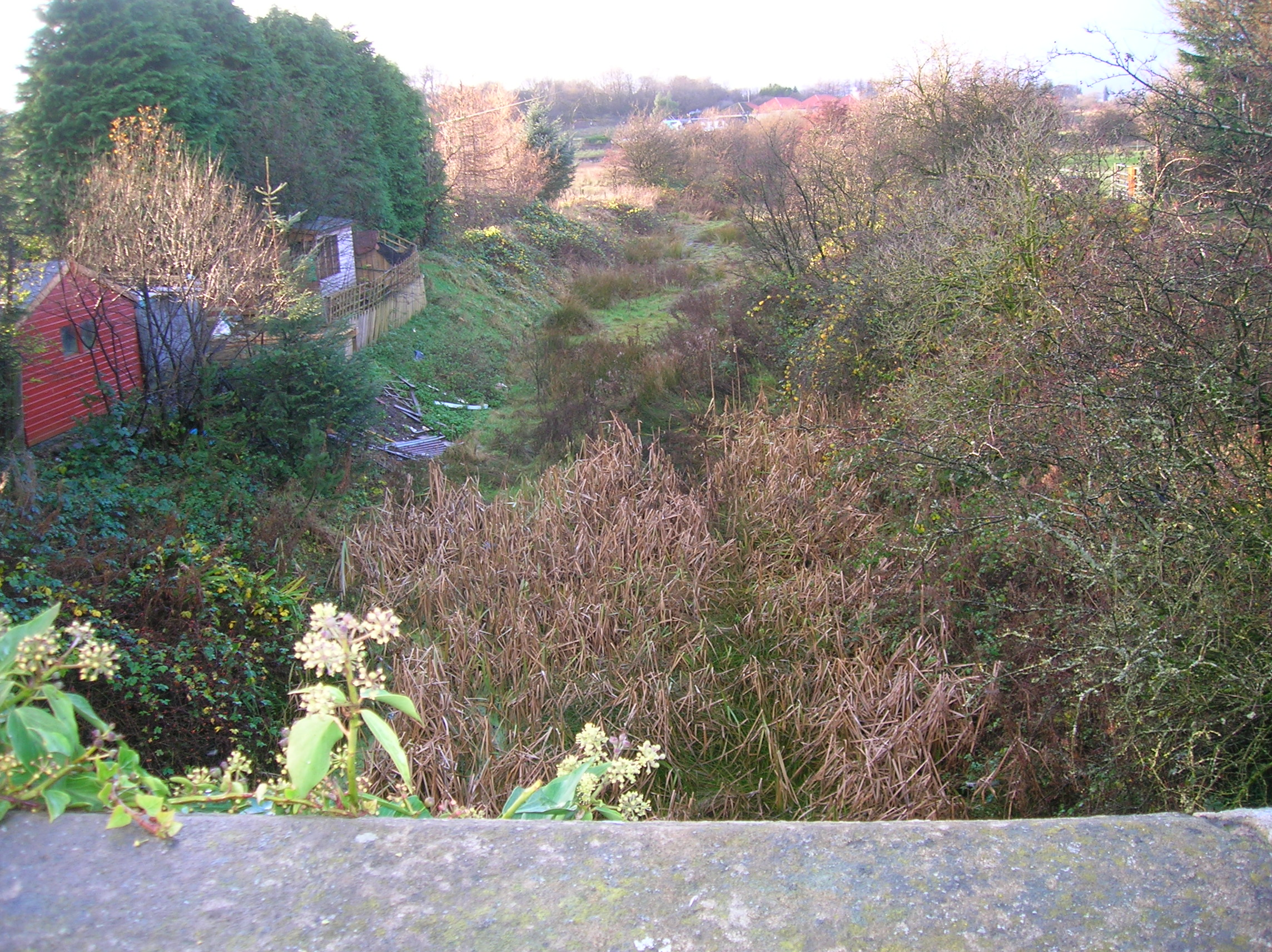
The railway cutting beyond Barrmill station facing Beith, near the old Junction with the Dockra mineral line

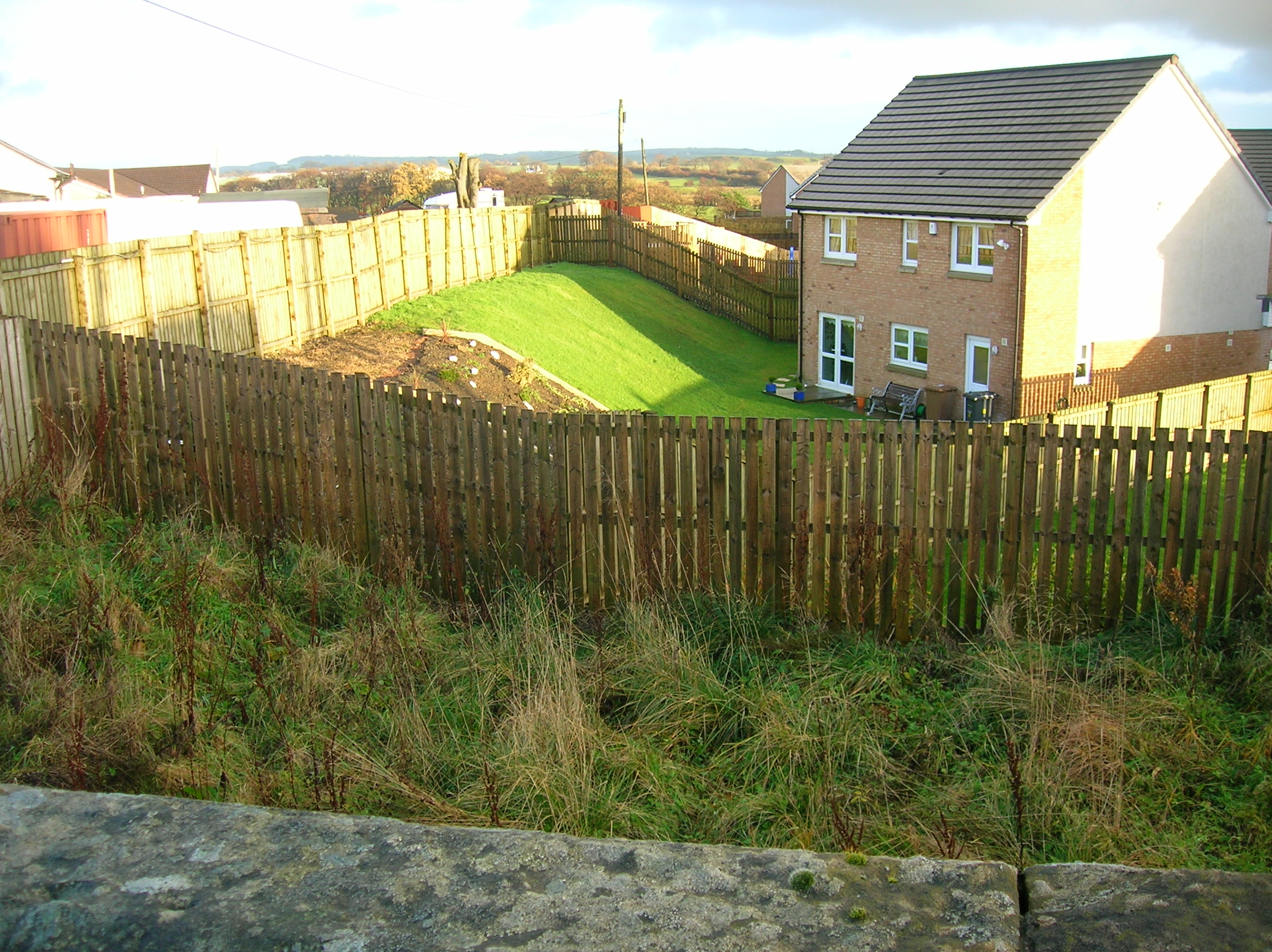
The site of Barrmill station from the old road overbridge

Barrmill railway station was the only intermediate station on the line from Lugton to Beith Town railway and opened on 26 June 1873, and closed permanently to passengers on 5 November 1962. Freight services continued on the line until 1964.

== Barrmill village and railway - 2007 ==
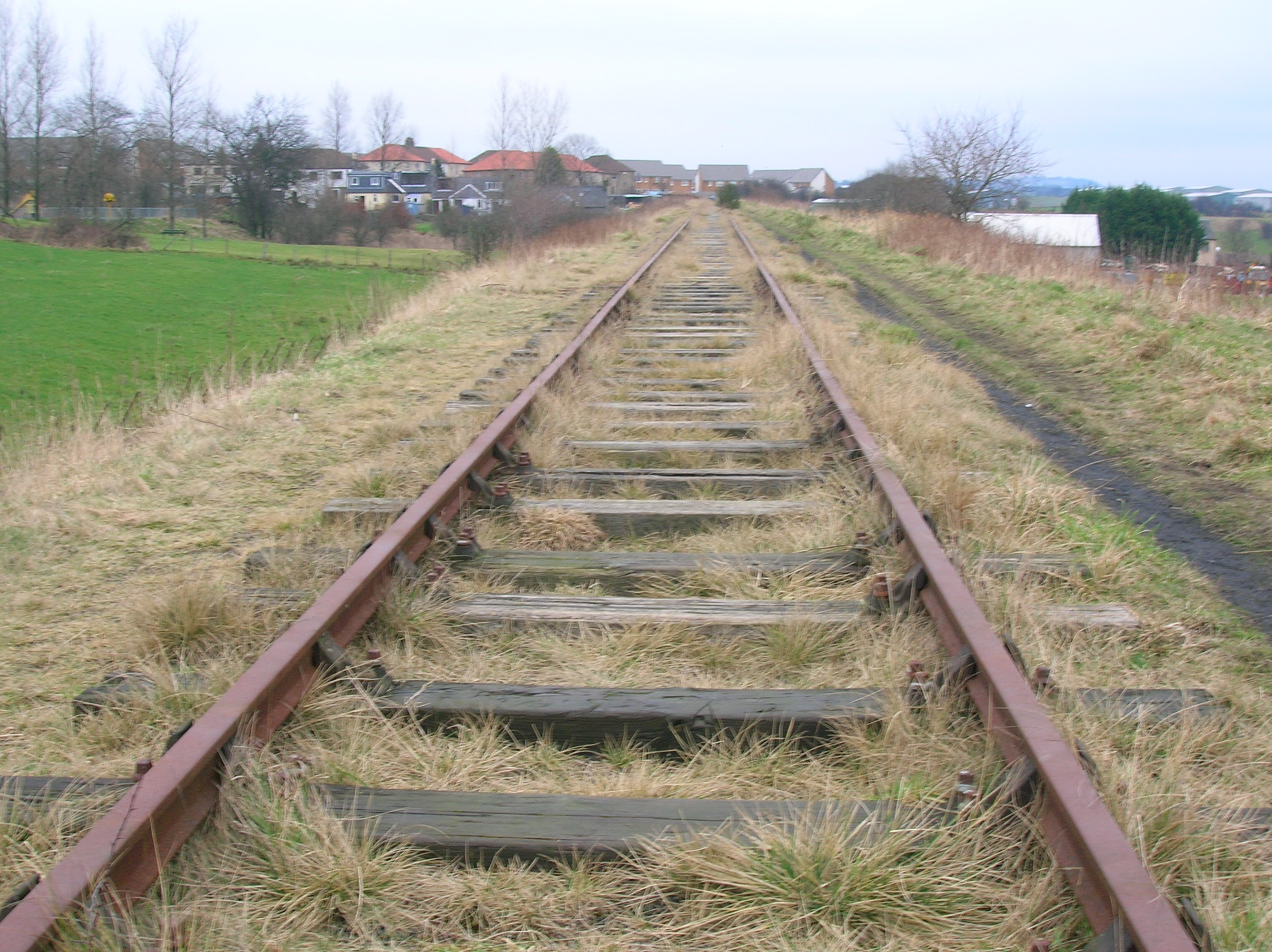
The old railway line running towards Lugton at Barmill

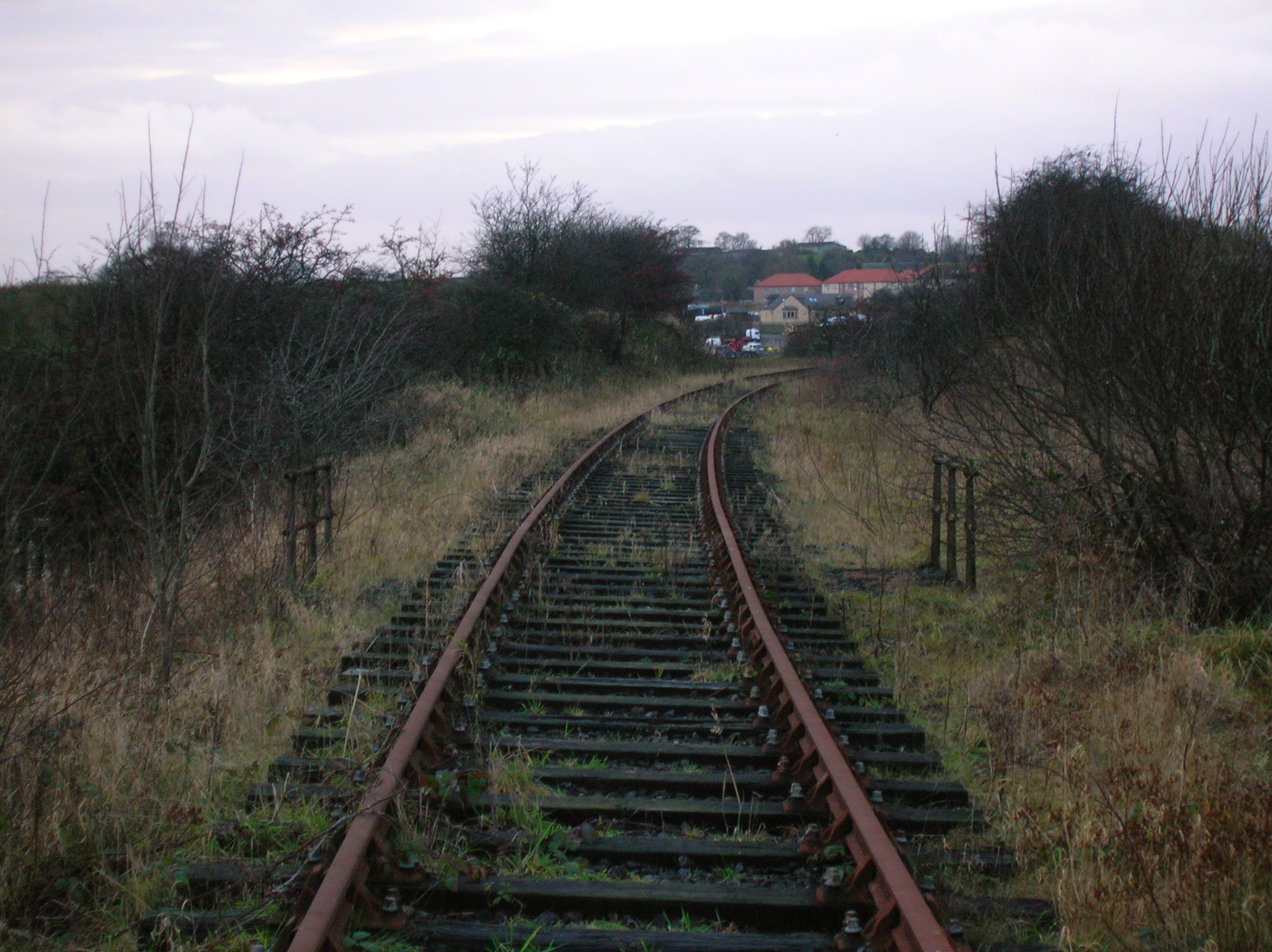
Approaching Barrmill from Lugton near the old Kilbirnie Junction

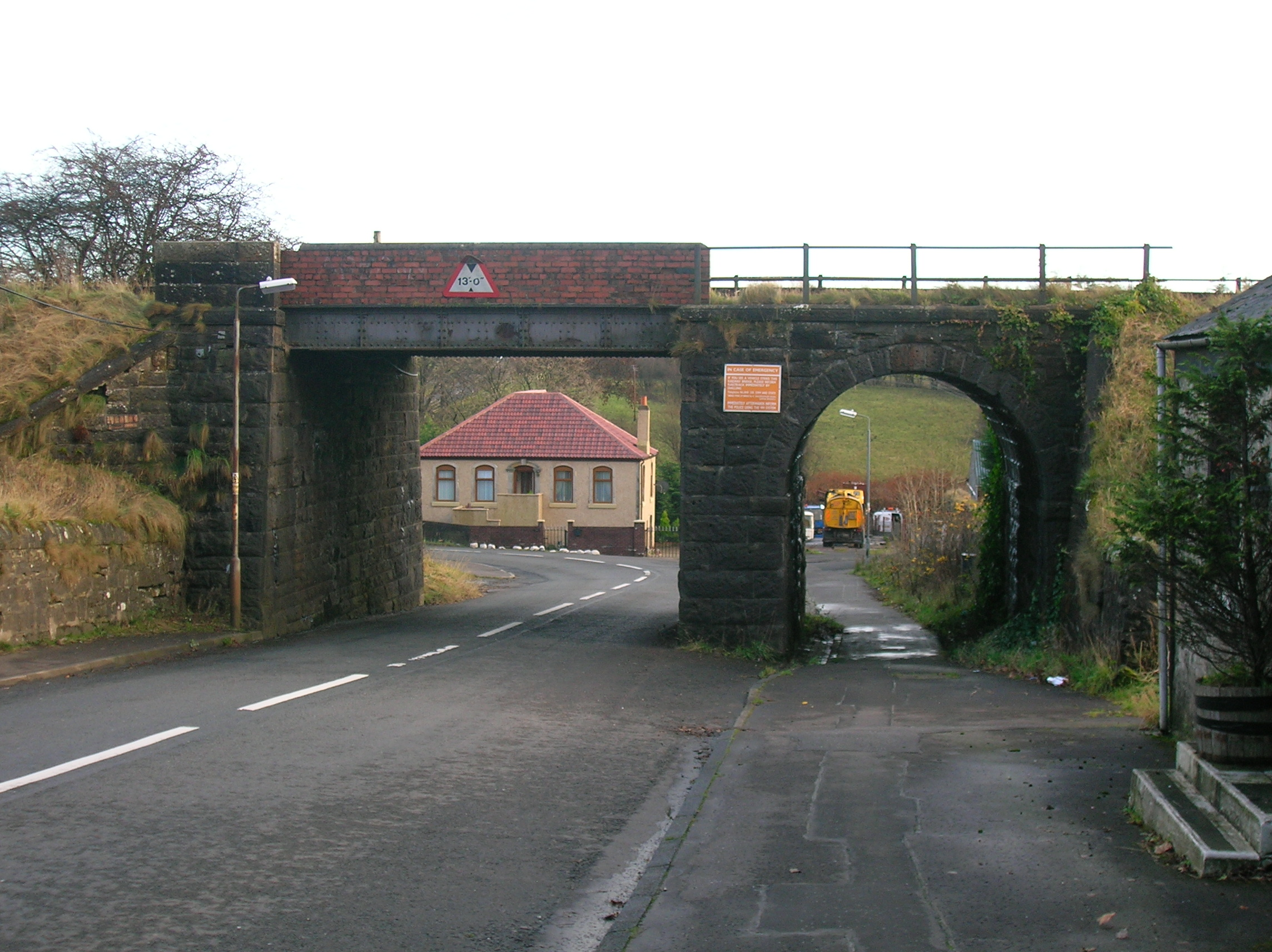
The old railway bridge over the mainstreet

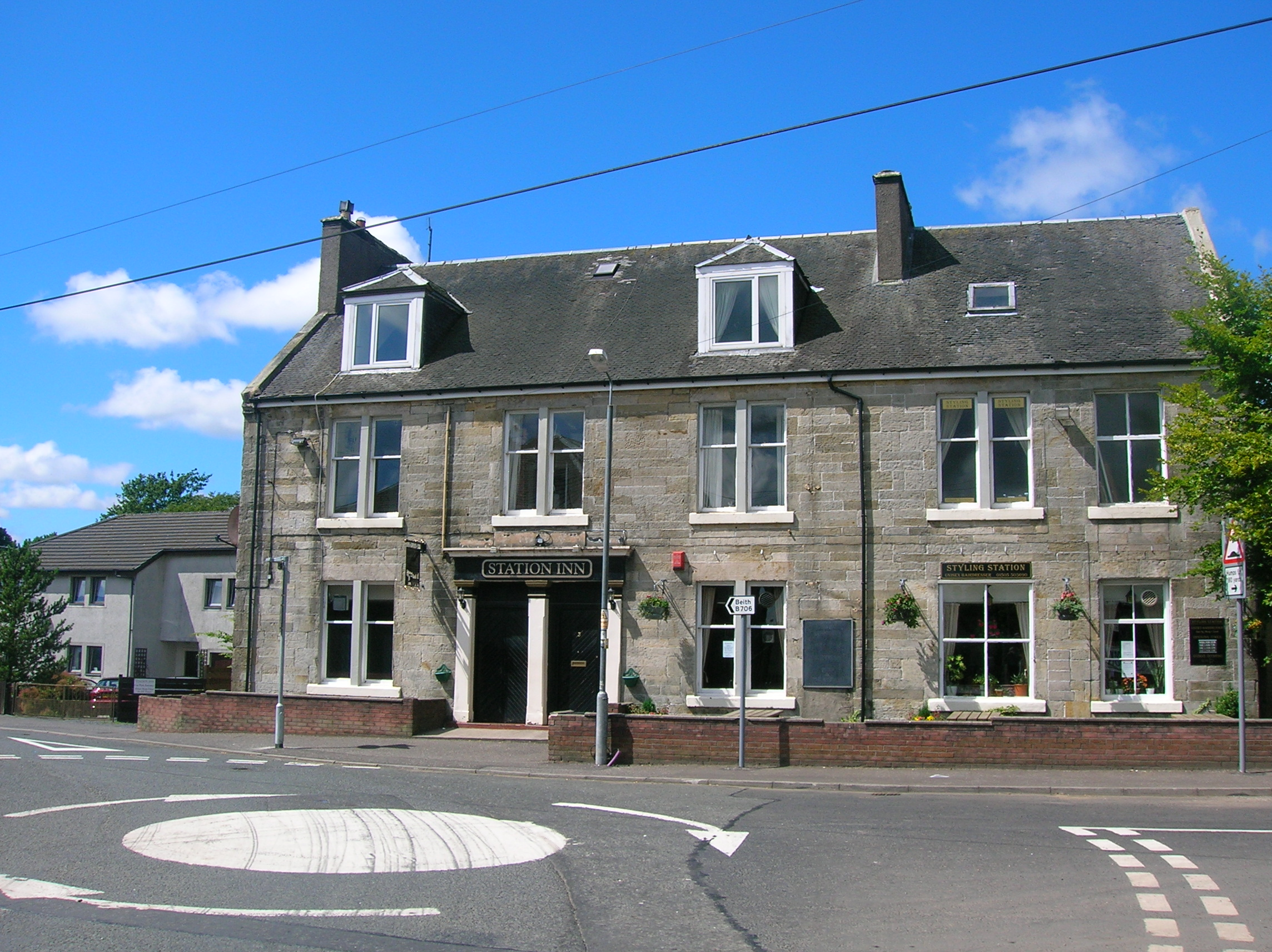
The Station Inn in Barrmill

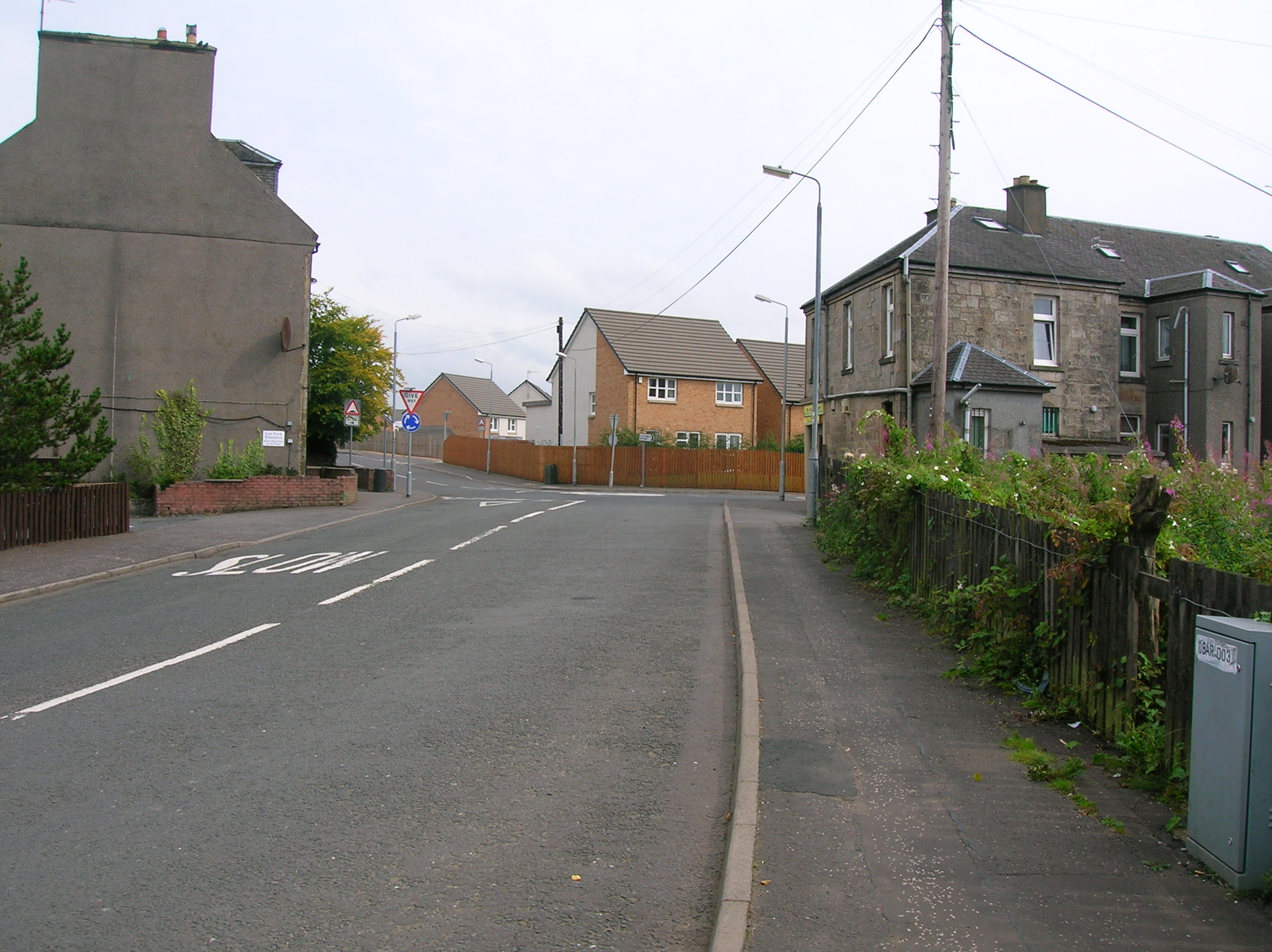
Barrmill crossroads, with hotel and shop

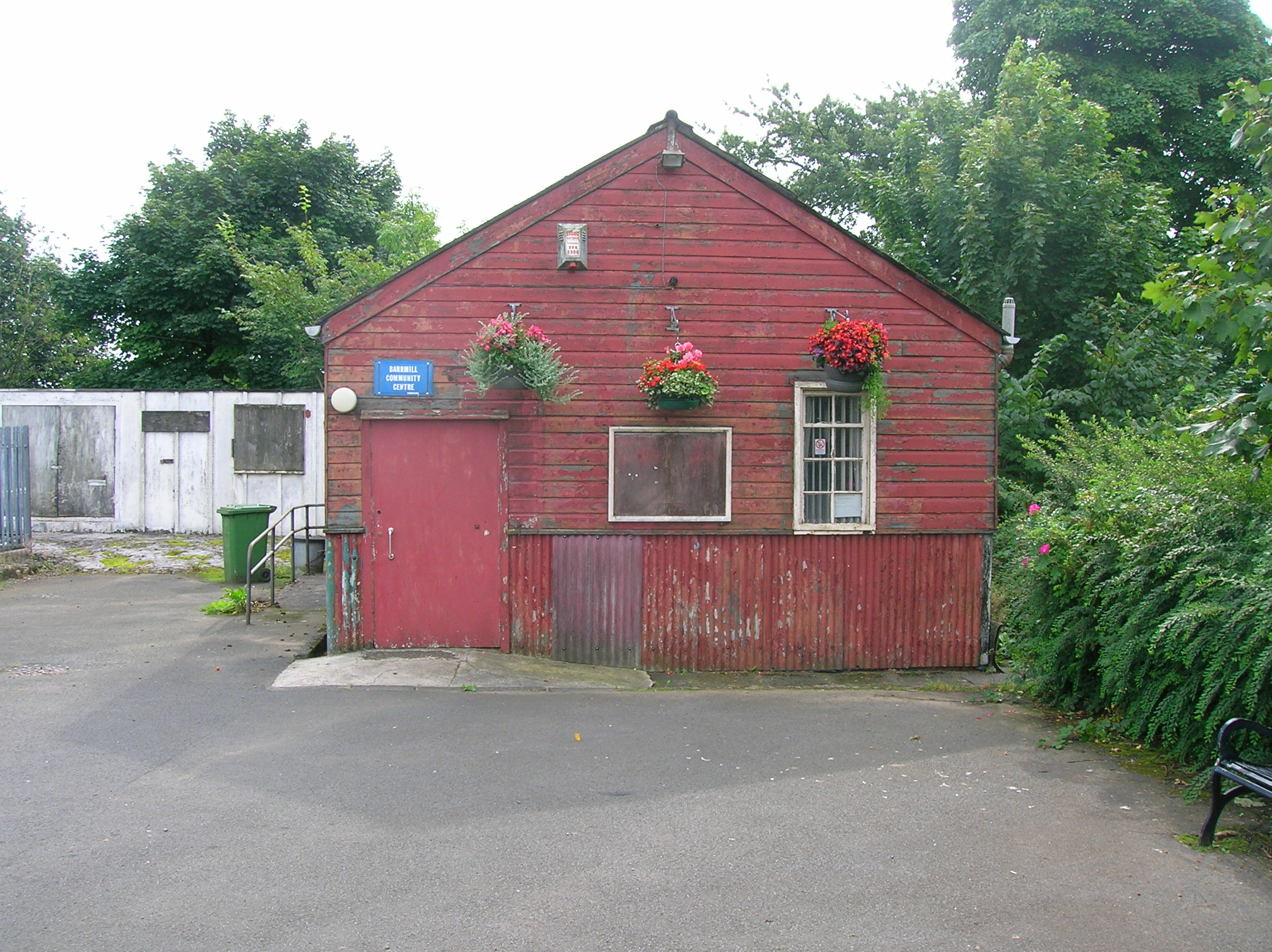
Barrmill's Community Hall

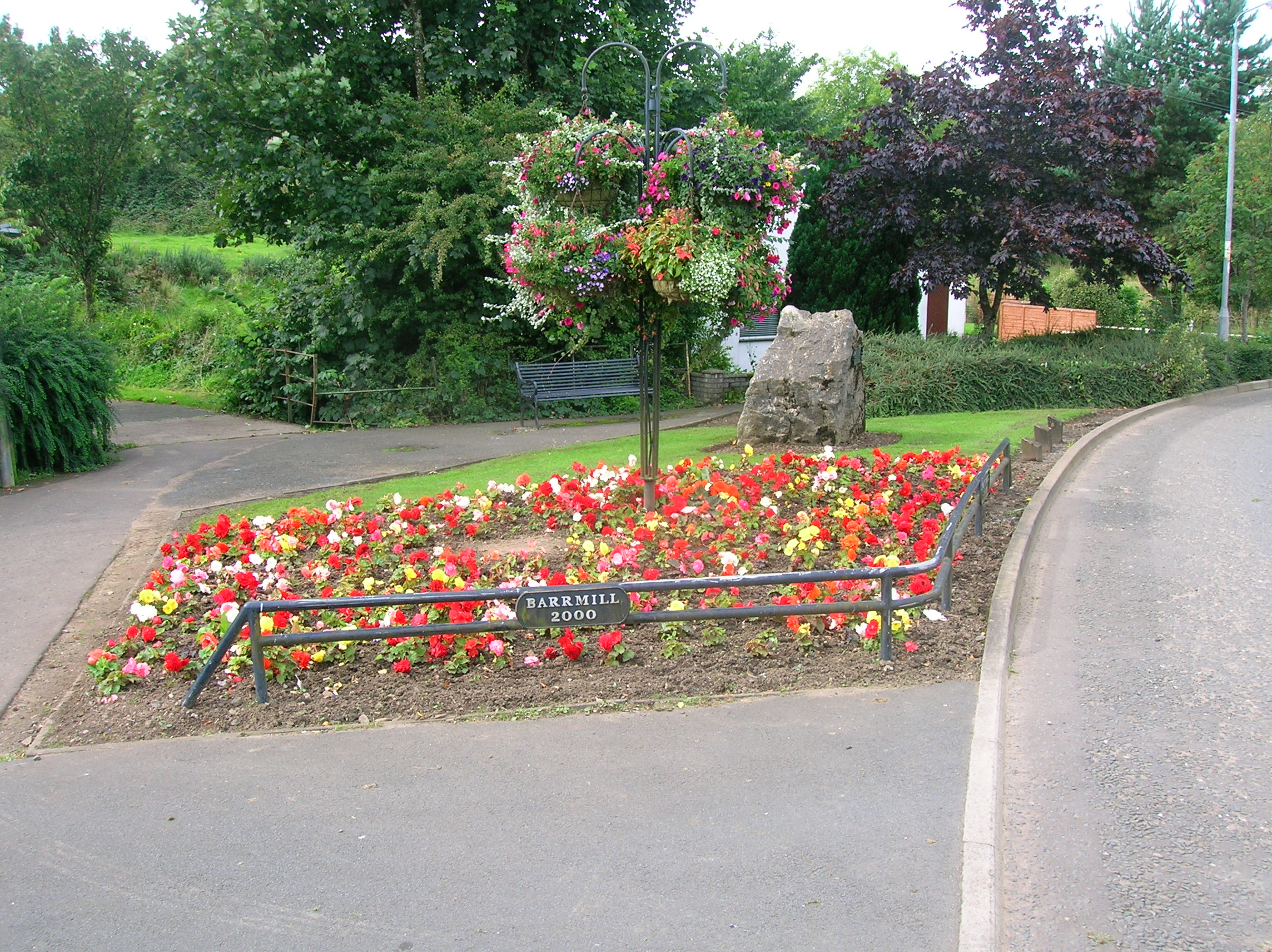
Barrmill's Millennium Garden

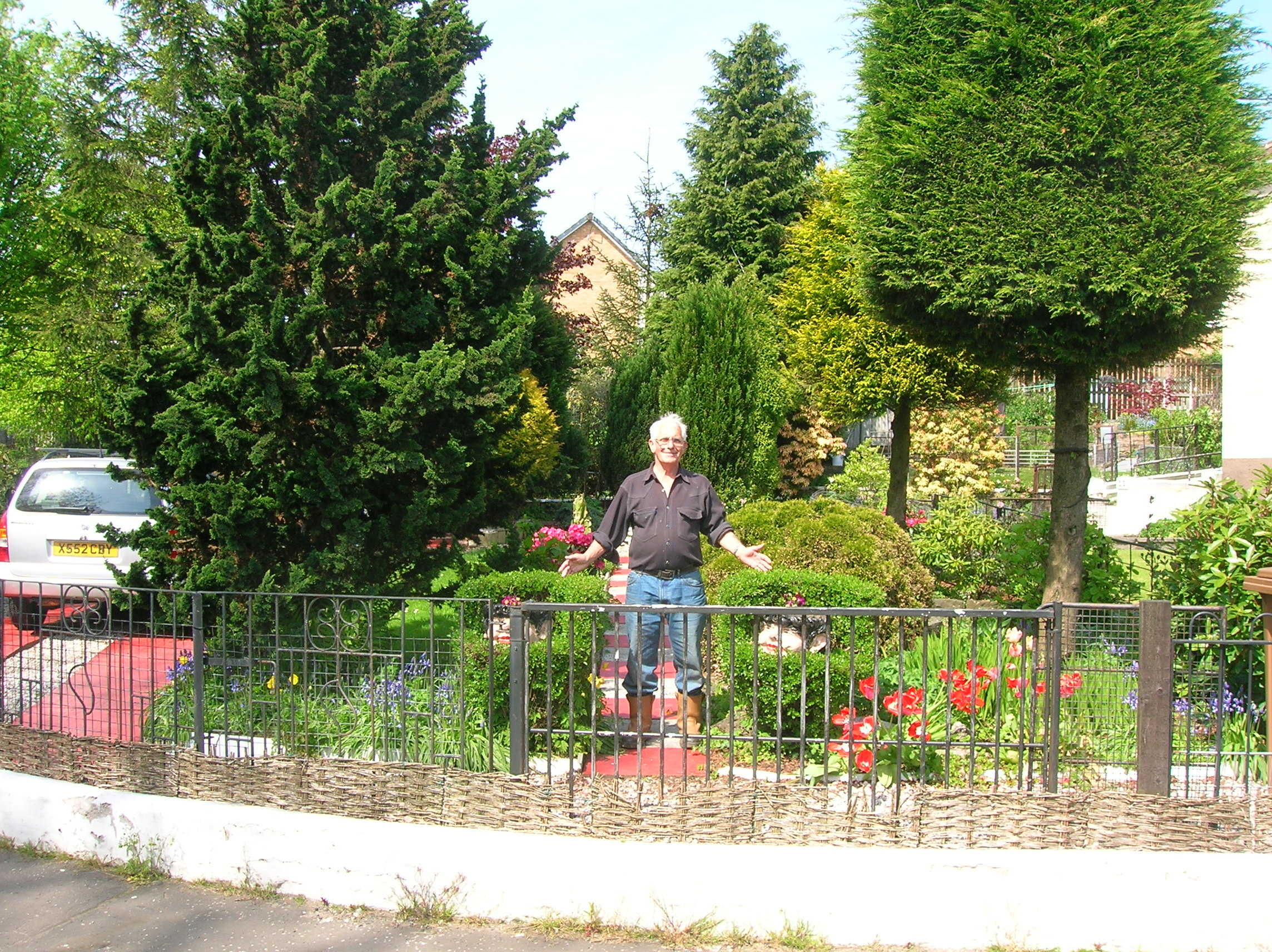
A Barrmill garden built using recycled materials

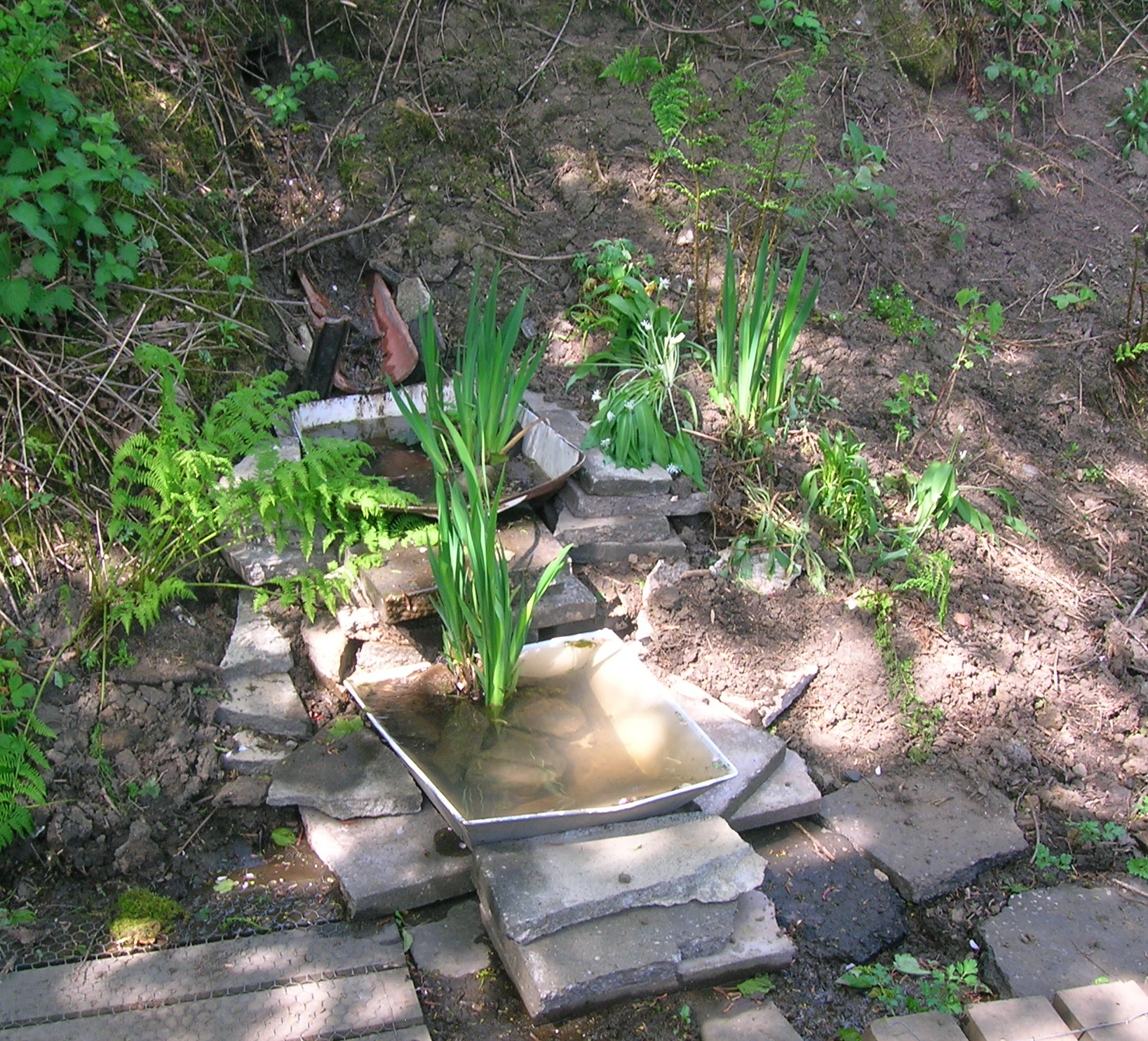
A water feature in the Veil Grove, Barrmill Park

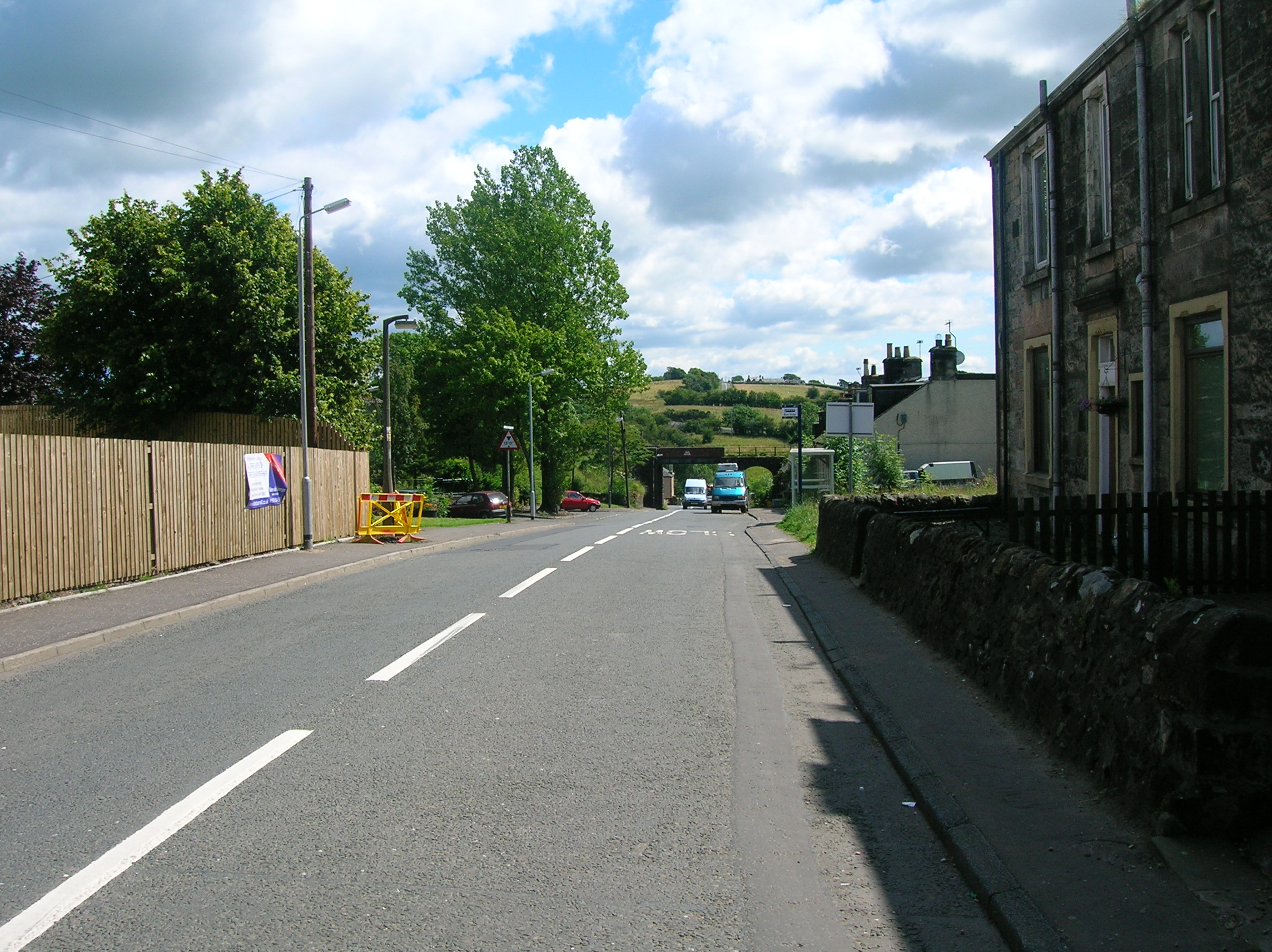
Barrmill's mainstreet with the railway bridge, looking towards Greenhills

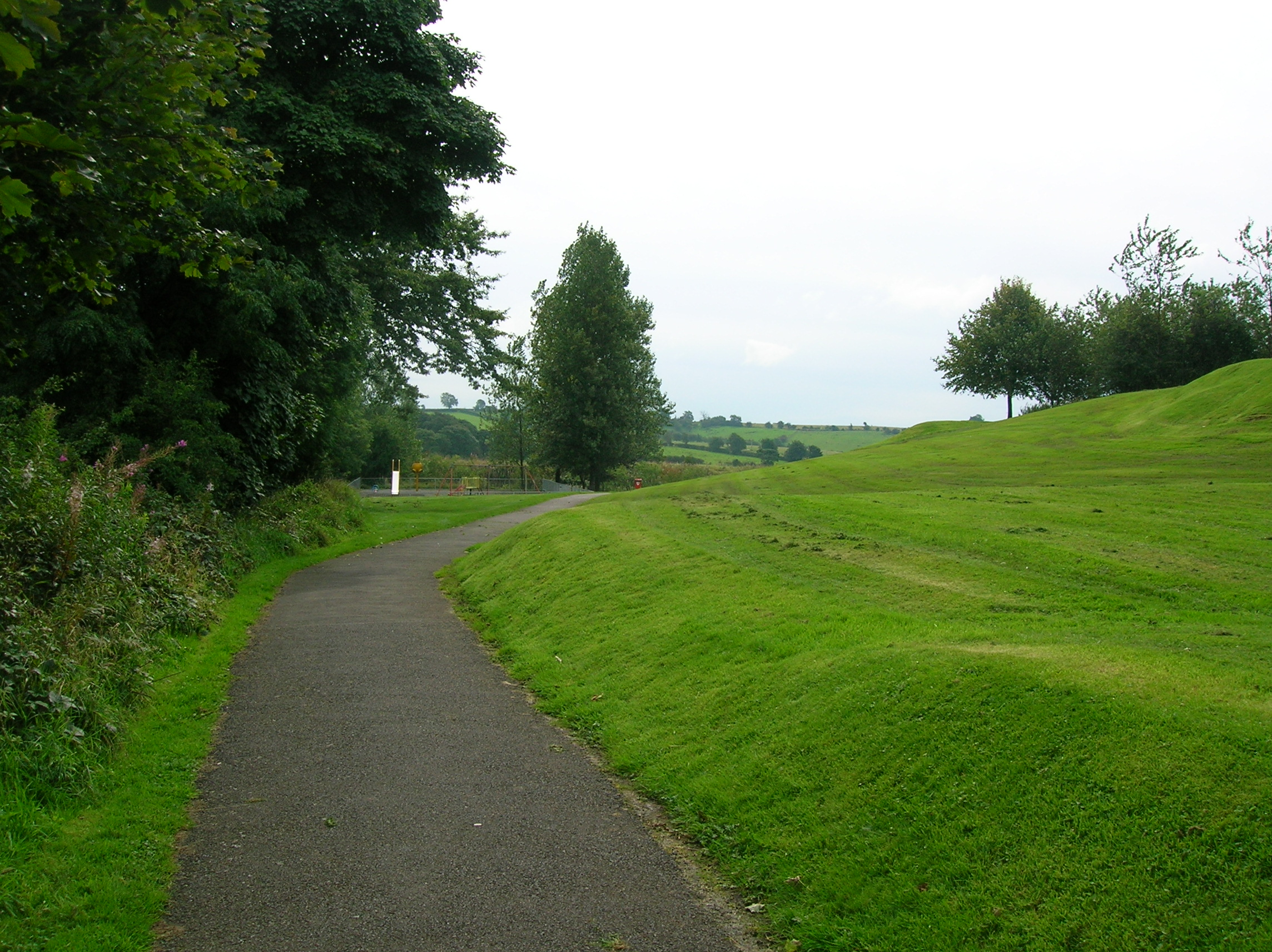
Barrmill's park

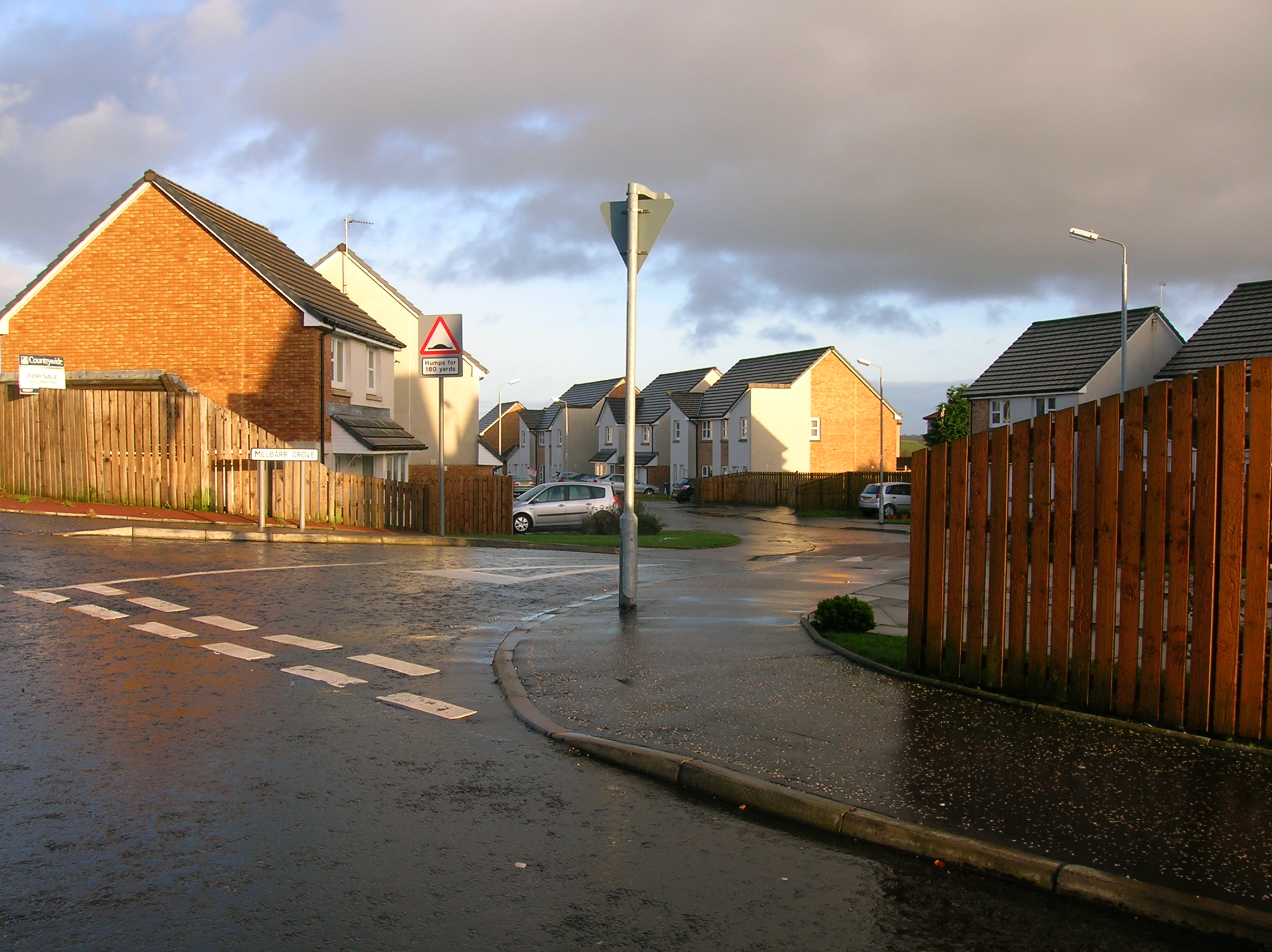
Millbarr Grove on the site of the old station and goods yard

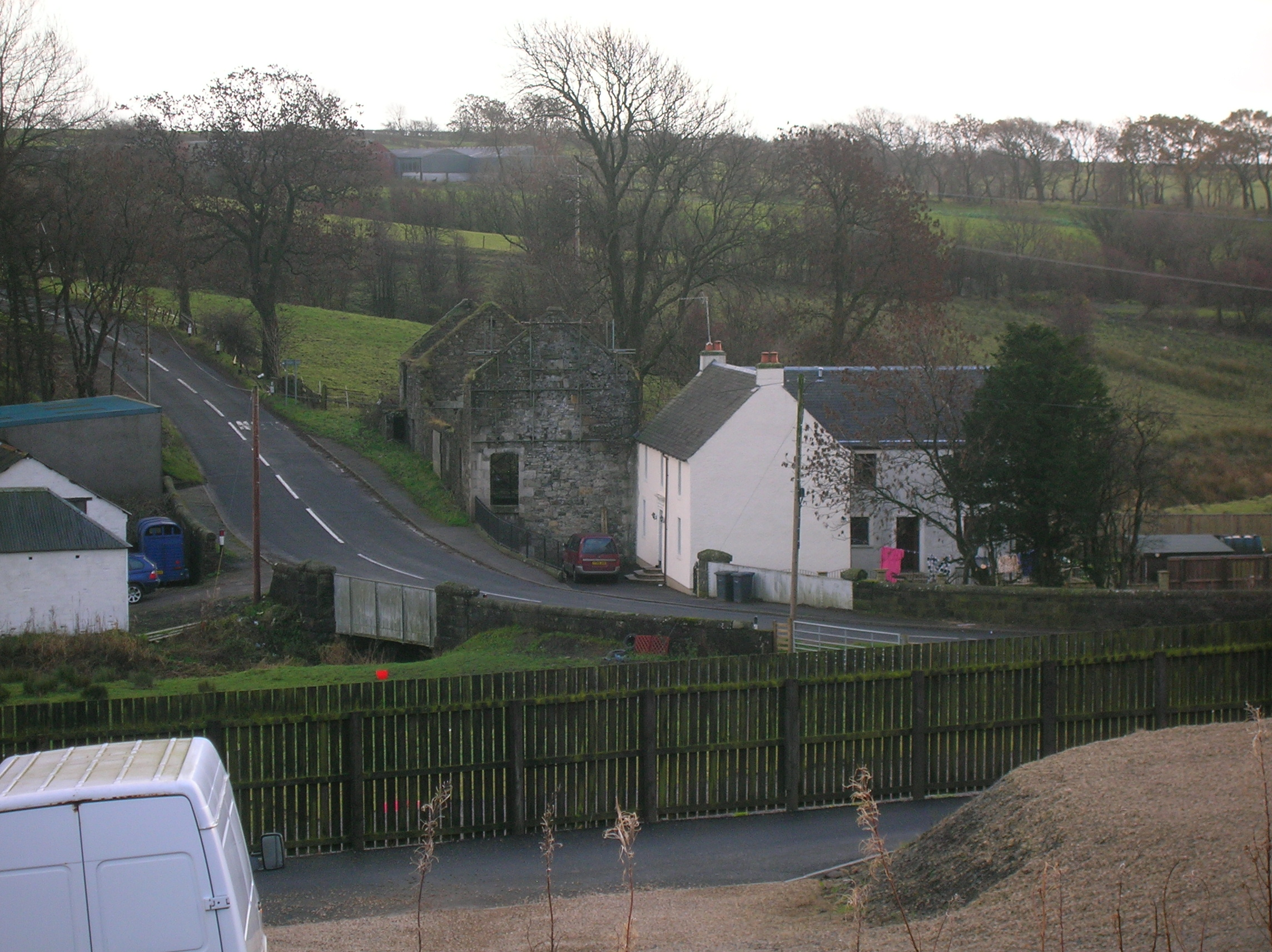
Barrmill's Giffen Mill and the old Miller's house

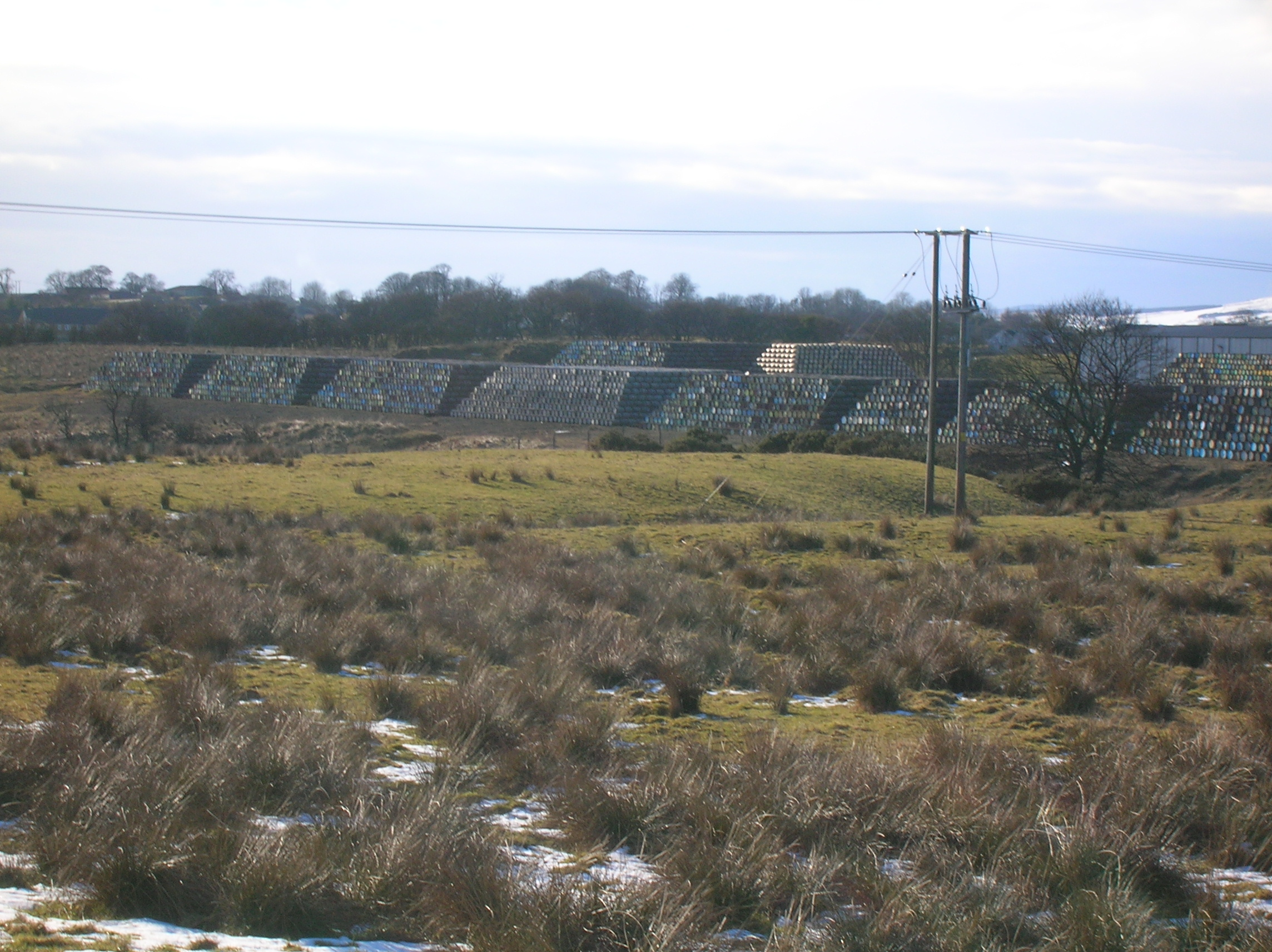
Whisky barrels at the nearby Balgray Bond, Chivas Regal

== Bellcraig and Braefoot ==
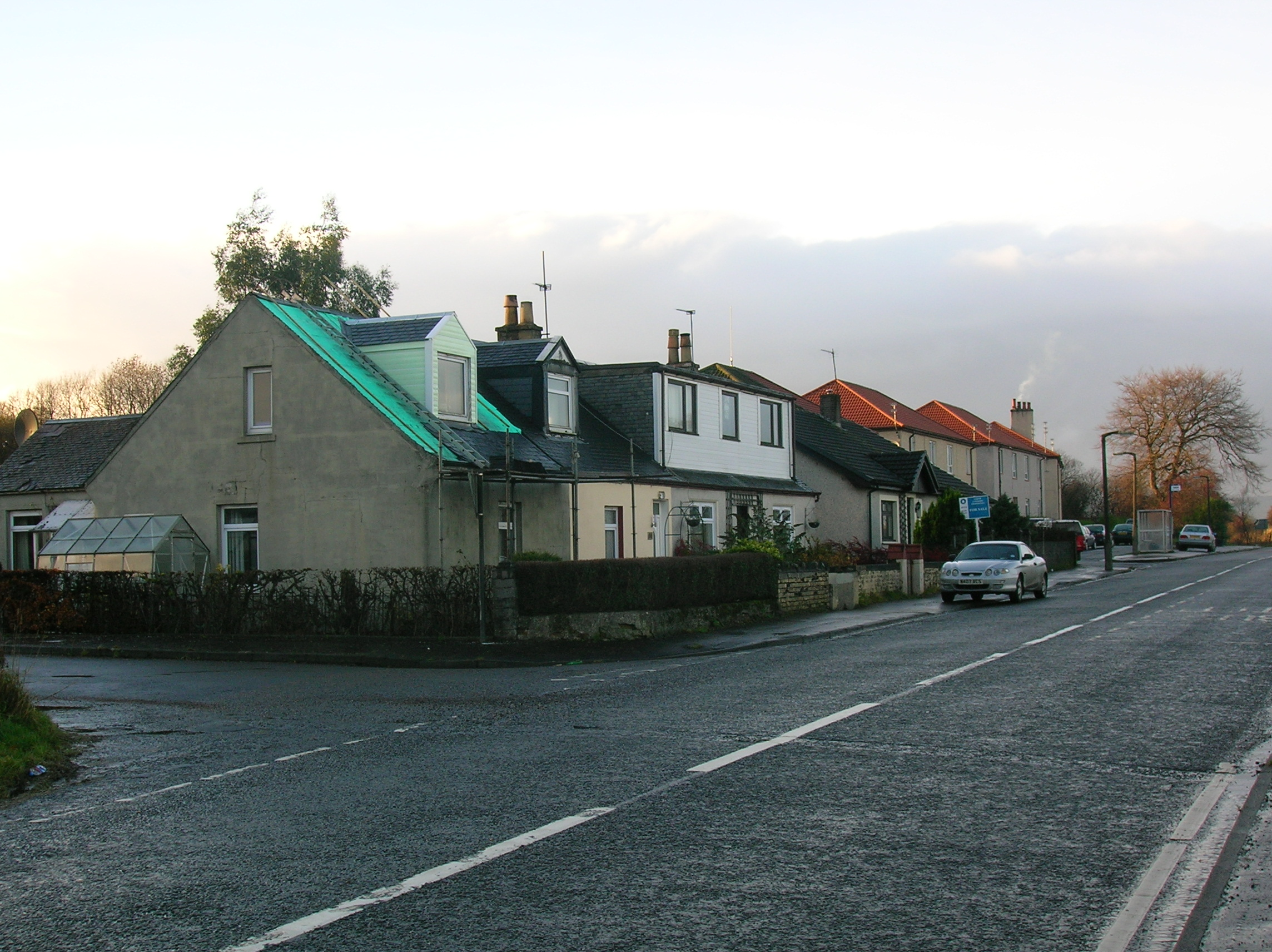
Bellcraig and Crawford Terrace

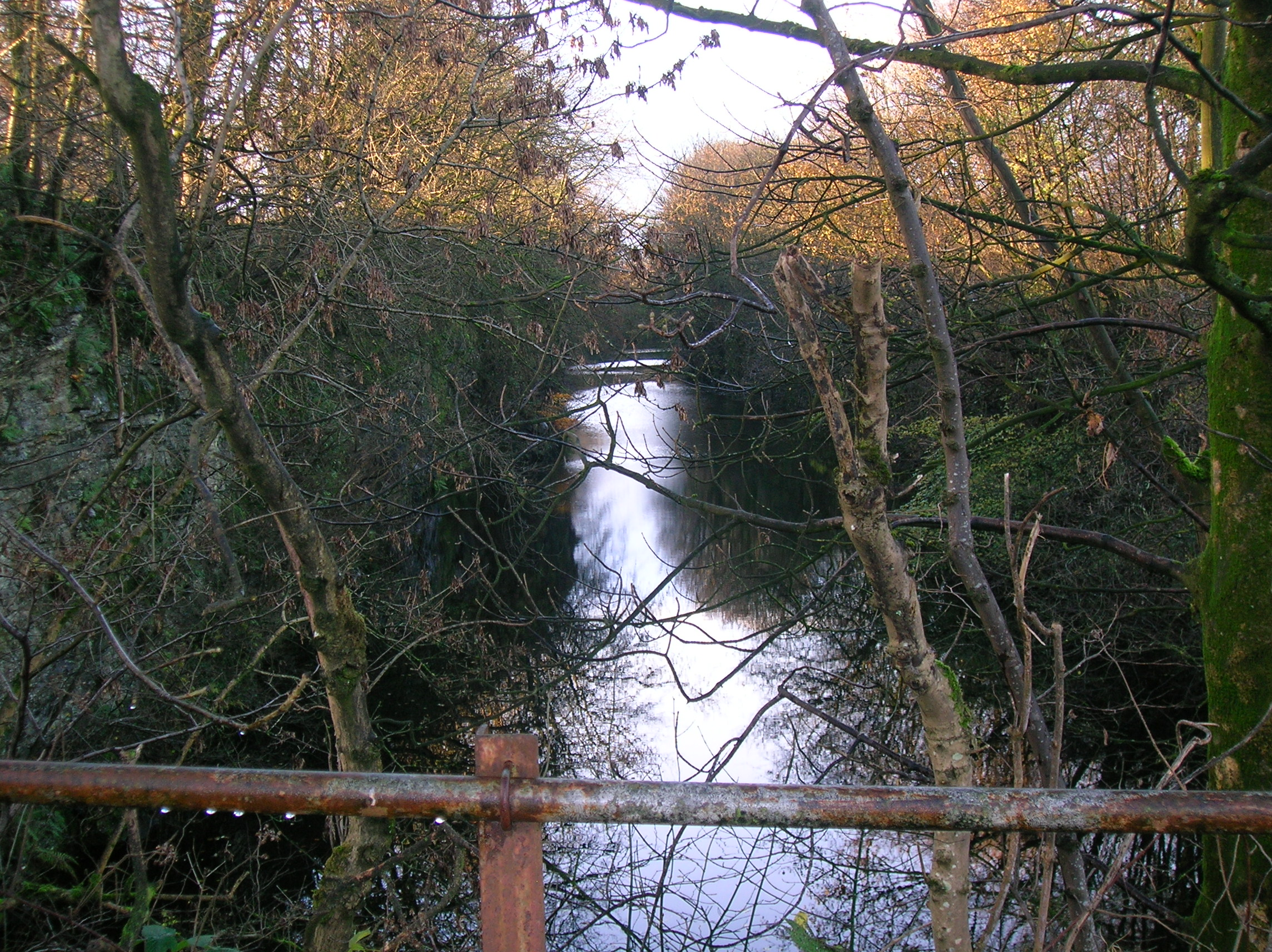
The old flooded limestone quarry at Bellcraig

Bellcraig House stood near the old entrance to Bogston House and was destroyed by quarrying for whinstone. In 1844 John Ritchie of Bellcraigs House died. Bellcraig and Crawford Terrace form a small hamlet close to Barrmill. The Braefoot Building stood on the other, north side of the road, owned by Merry & Cunningham the ironmasters. The building was demolished in 1956 and the residents moved to new housing in Beith. The Mack family were onetime residents.

These houses, some of which housed quarry workers, lie close to a 20th-century limestone quarry nearby, now abandoned and filled with water. The area had many small limestone and ironstone quarries. Dockra and Broadstone quarries are quite nearby. Around 30 people were employed here in the 1930s.

== Cholera outbreak ==
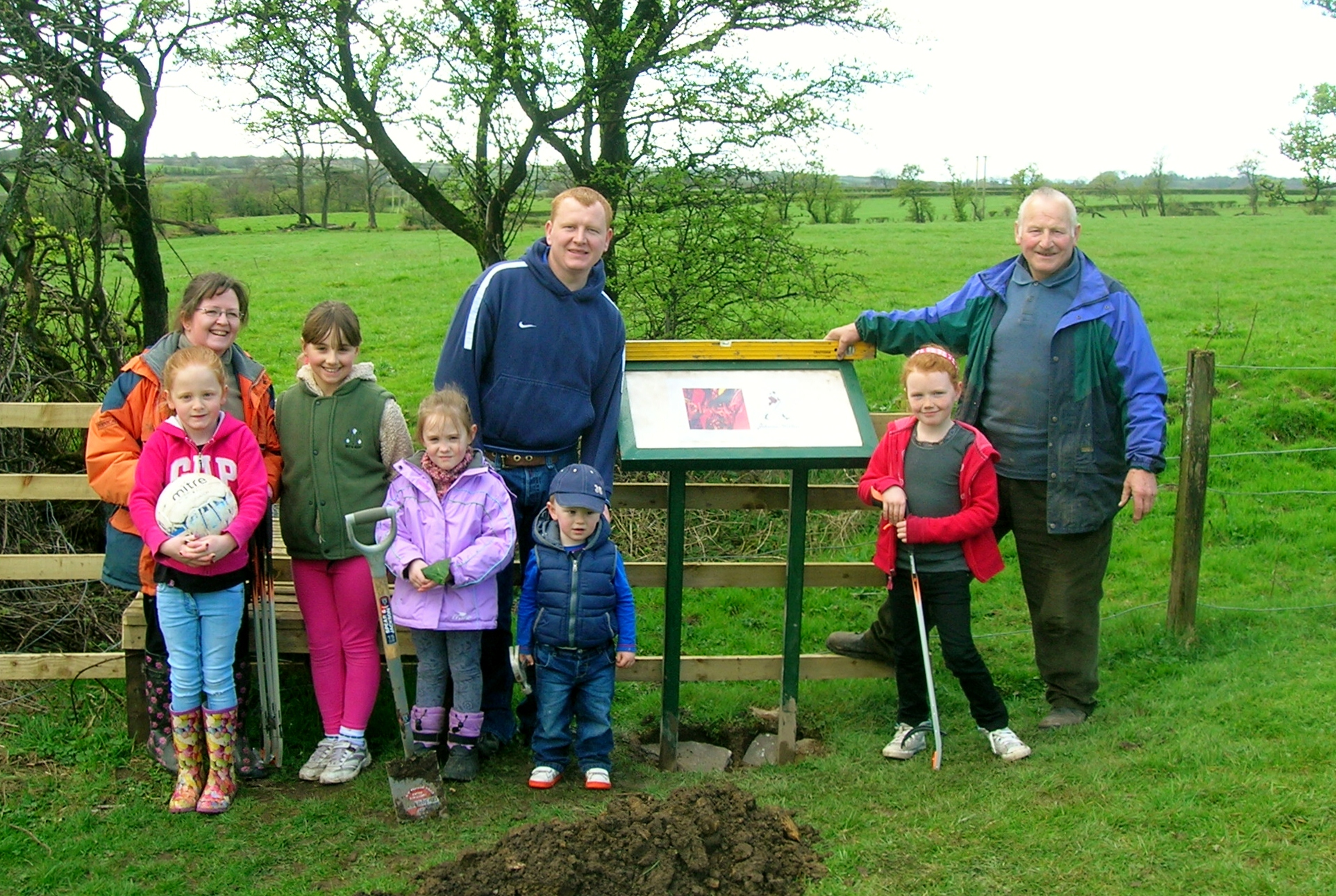
The stile leading to the Dead Man's Planting with Barrmill conservation volunteers.

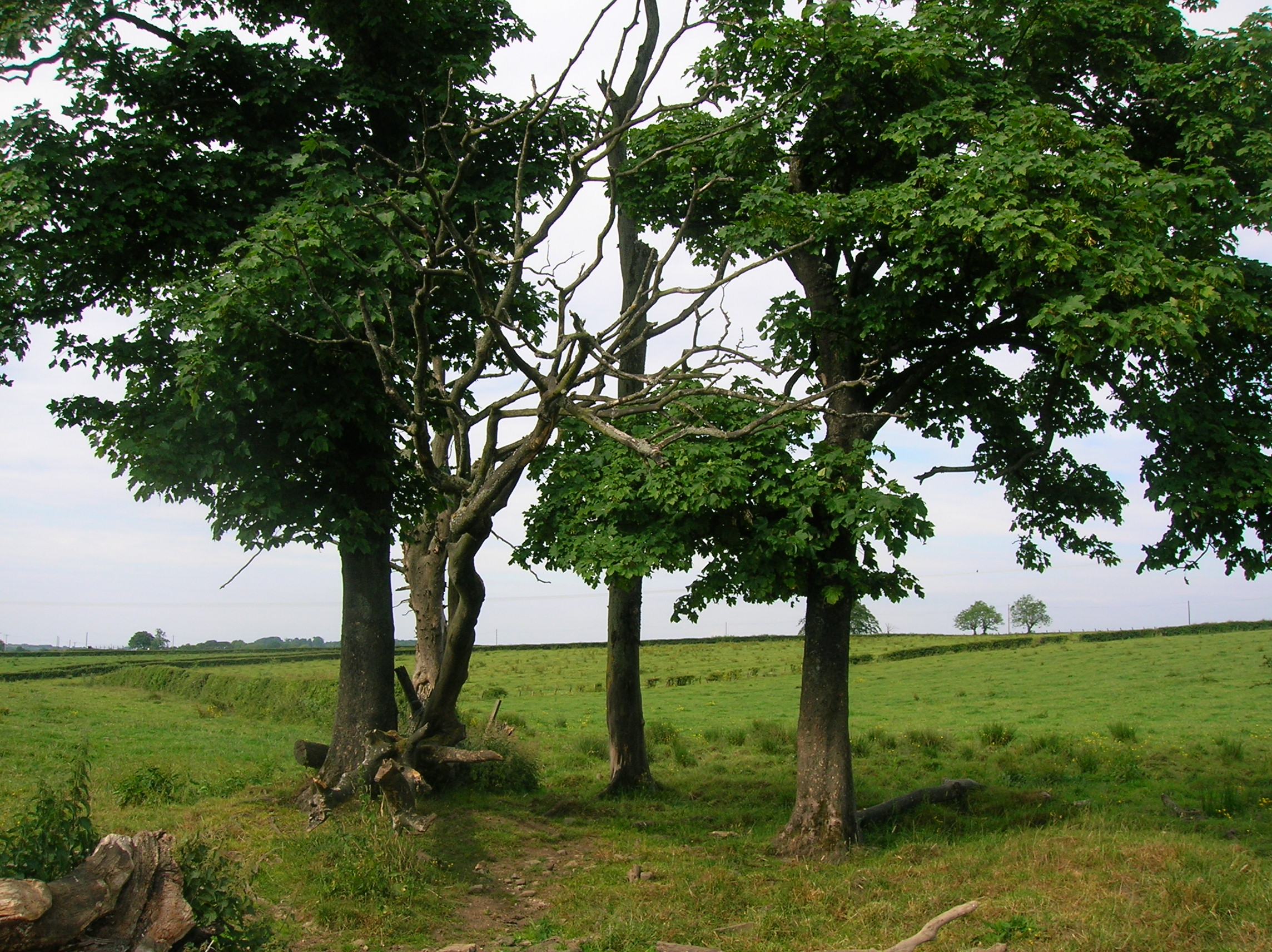
Detail of the site of the old Cholera pit below South Barr farm in 2012, known locally as the 'Deid mans plantin'

In 1832 around forty local youths died from cholera within a week of visiting a Gipsy encampment to have their fortunes told and were buried in a triangular Cholera pit plot at the base of Jameshill, lying to the south-west of Barrmill village. No record of the people buried here seems to exist and it is likely that they were buried without any religious observance.

Troops were regularly placed at road junctions to prevent entry or exit during cholera outbreaks and normal burial in the Beith parish cemetery was impossible and impractical, given the number of deaths. As is usual for such sites a remote spot was selected, well away from water courses. No health risk remains today.

In 1908 the local paper recorded that not even a fence surrounded the spot and a resident of Barrmill suggested that a suitable stone and a fence should be erected to mark the resting place of the unfortunate ancestors of Barrmill residents and also to recognise the sacredness of the burial site.

Wilhelmina Boyd records that in the 1930s the local children regarded the site as 'sacred ground' and wouldn't walk on it.

The burial site is located on the lands of South Barr Farm and was at one time fenced off and bordered by trees, kept in order thanks to the Crawford Brothers of the old factory until they died. It has been neglected since then, however a stile and footbridge were built by the Barrmill Conservation Group in 2012 to allow easier access to the site which also has a Geocache. In 2014 the Barrmill Conservation Group built a new fence around the cholera pit site.

== Dockra ==
Extensive limestone quarrying took place at Dockra with a mineral line running down to join with the Beith to Lugton line. Limekilns were located at the site, as were gunpowder magazines, a mine manager's house, a large bing, etc. The quarry is now flooded, but not infilled.

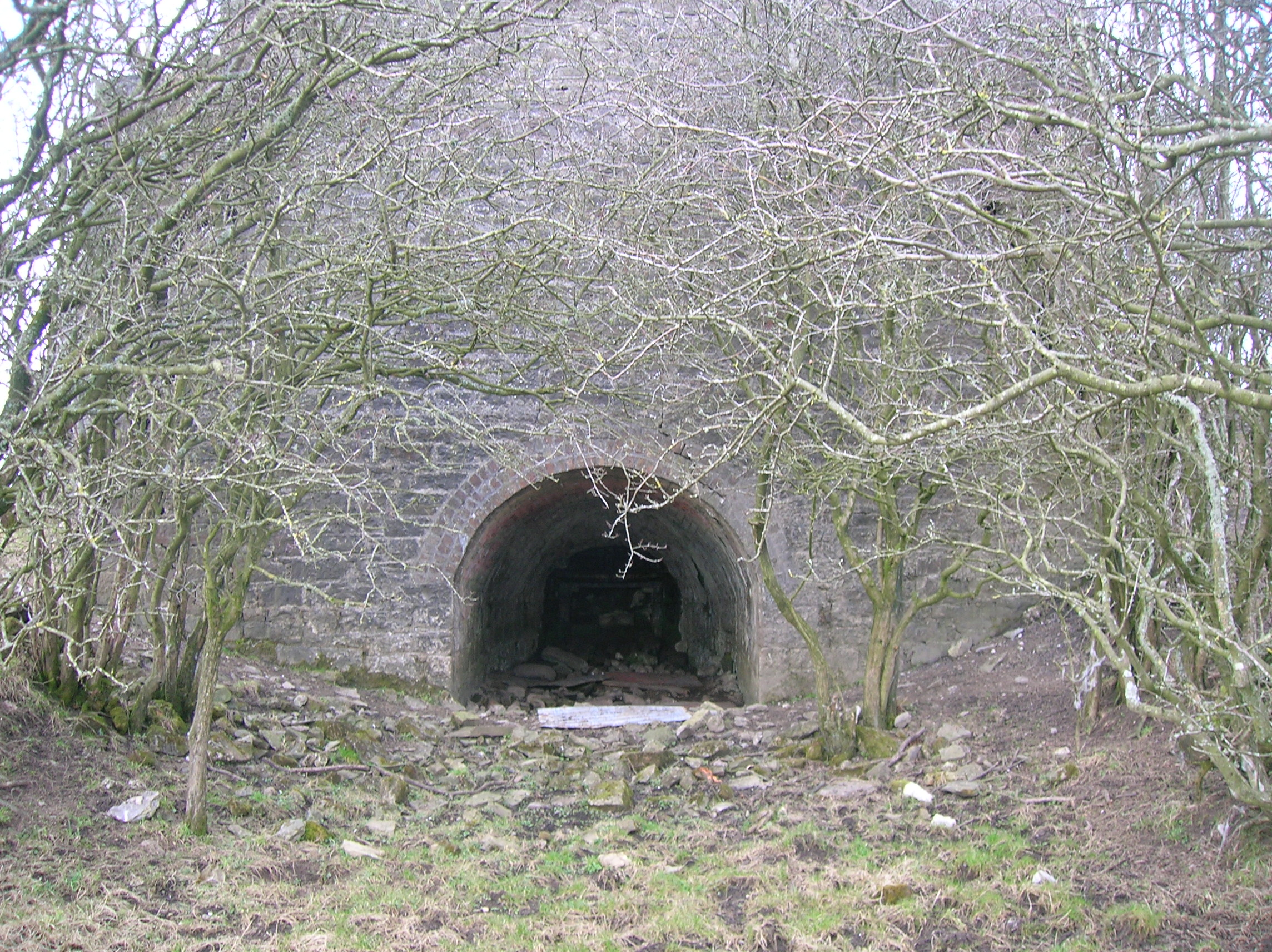
The eye of a more recent lime kiln

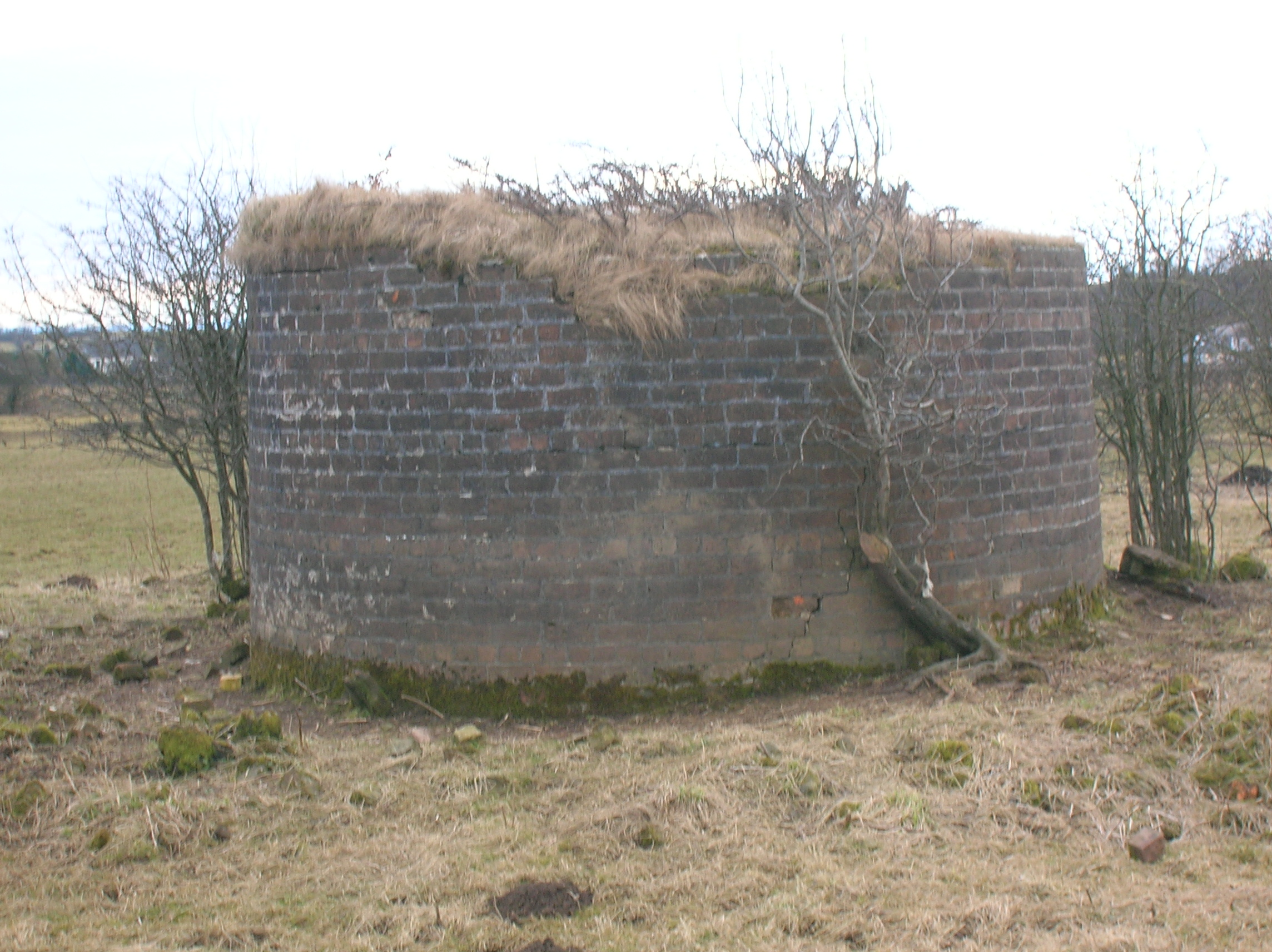
The back of a more recent kiln.

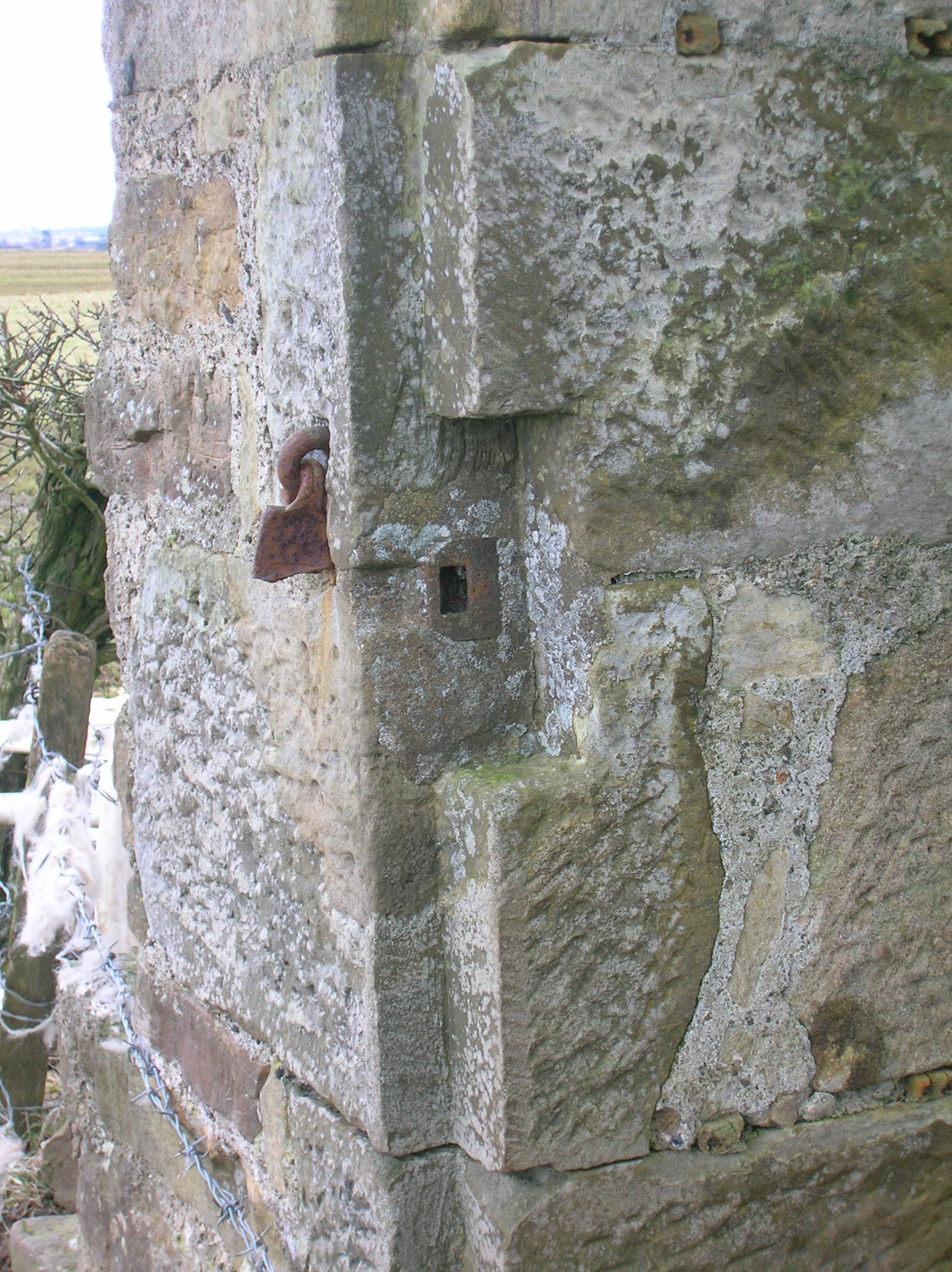
Details of the lock on the gunpowder magazine

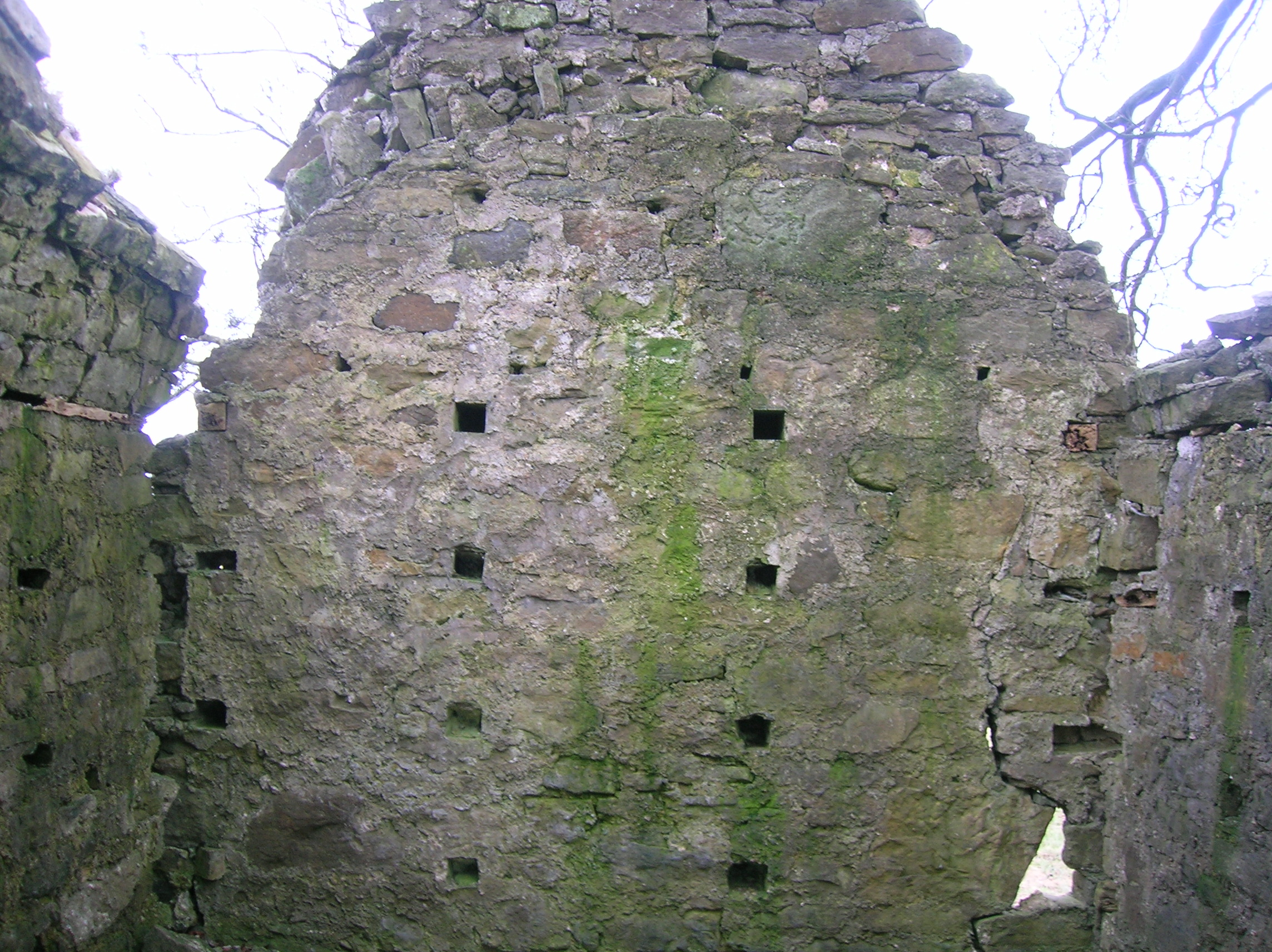
Internal details of the gunpowder magazine

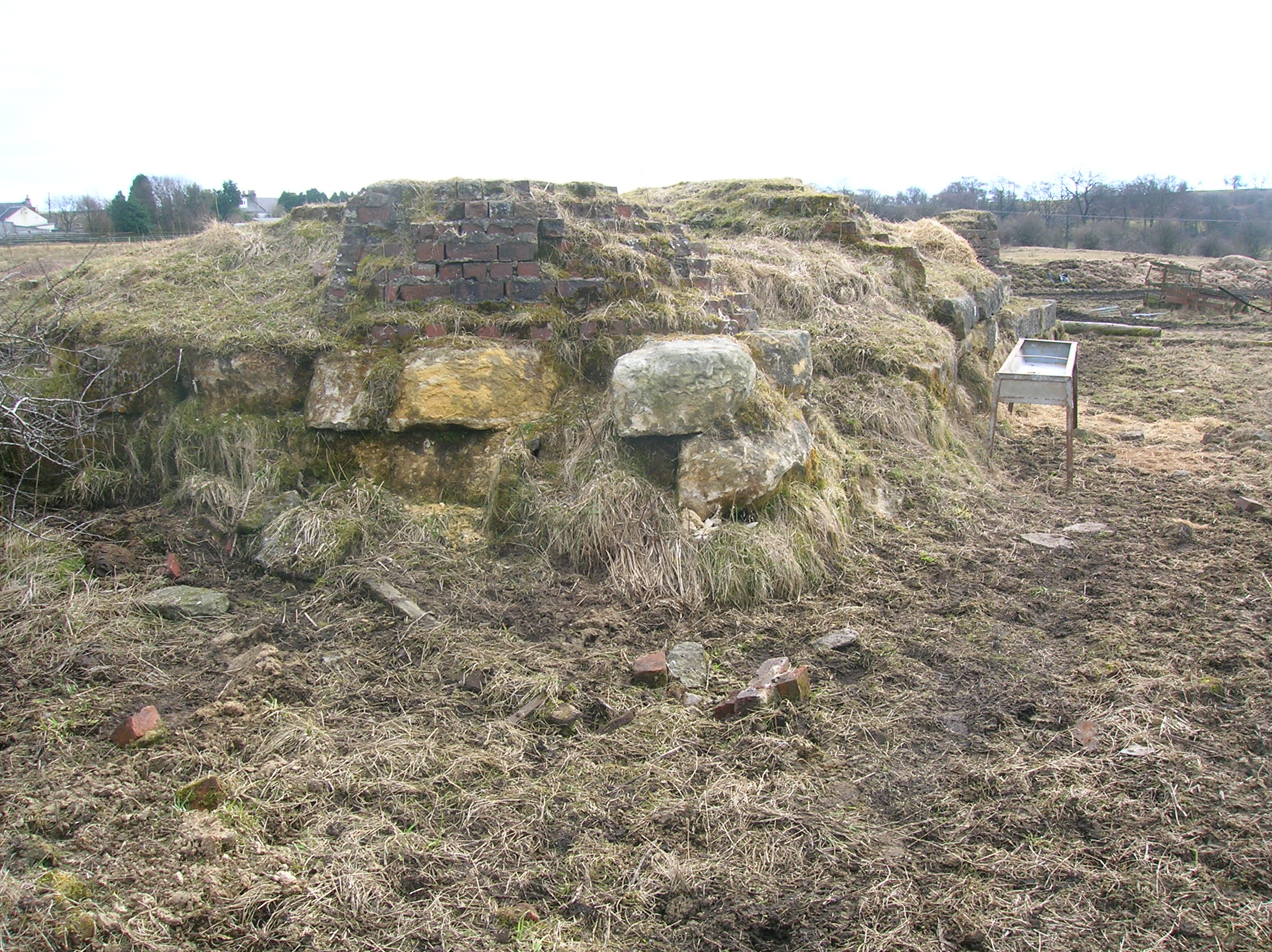
Ruins at the Dockra Ironstone works

An ironstone quarry was also located at the site and the ore, crushed on site, was taken down the 'bogey line' via Brackenhills railway station on the Glasgow & South Western railway line to the old Glengarnock steelworks, owned by the Glengarnock Iron & Steel Co. Ltd. The works closed in 1921, however the waste bings remained for many years. The 'Beith Supplement and Advertiser' reported in 1912 that after a two-month-long strike at Glengarnock Steelworks the ironstone works at Dockra would be re-opening.

== DM Beith ==
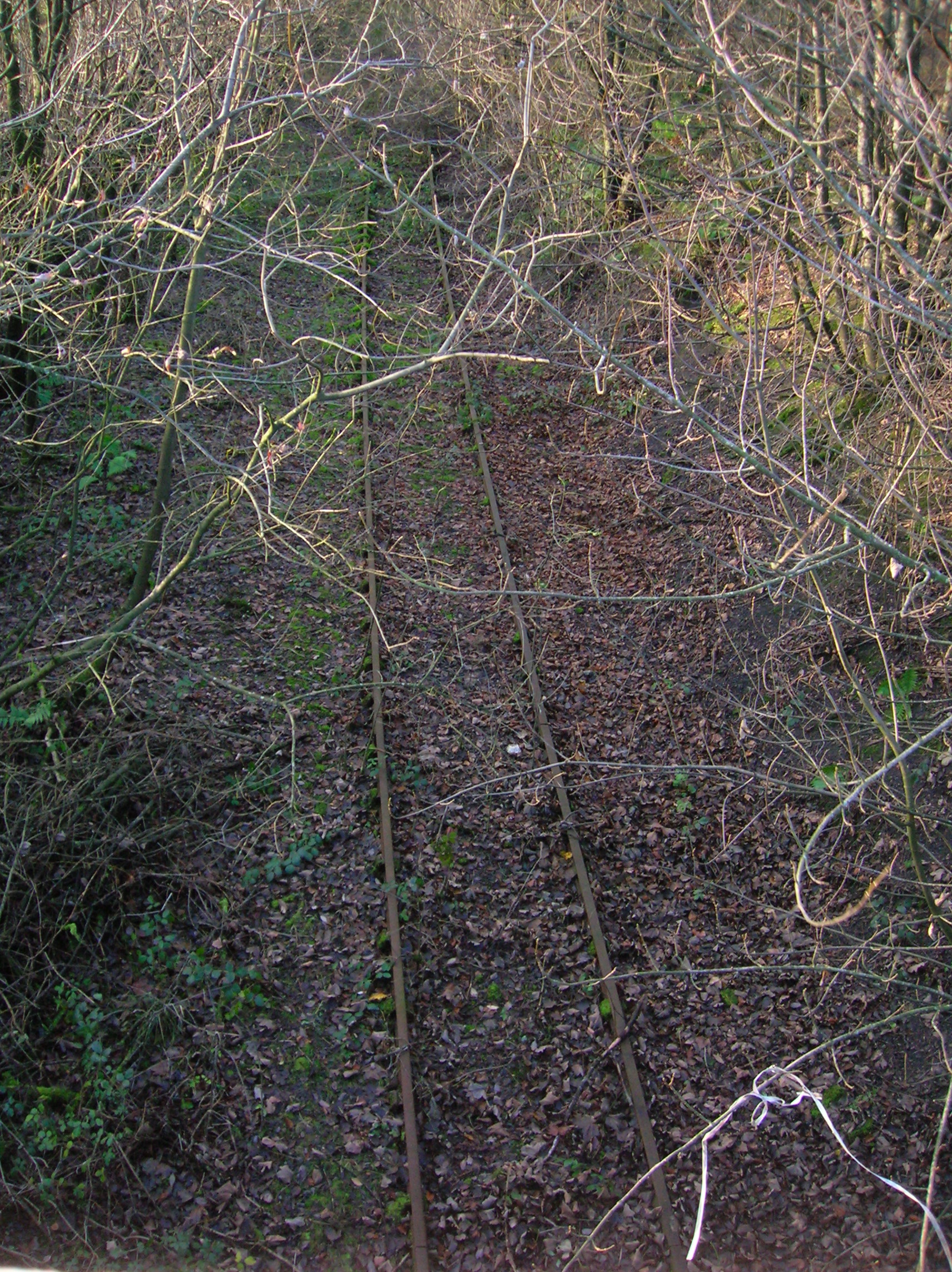
The last stretch of the railway line before the depot from Drumbuie Bridge in 2008

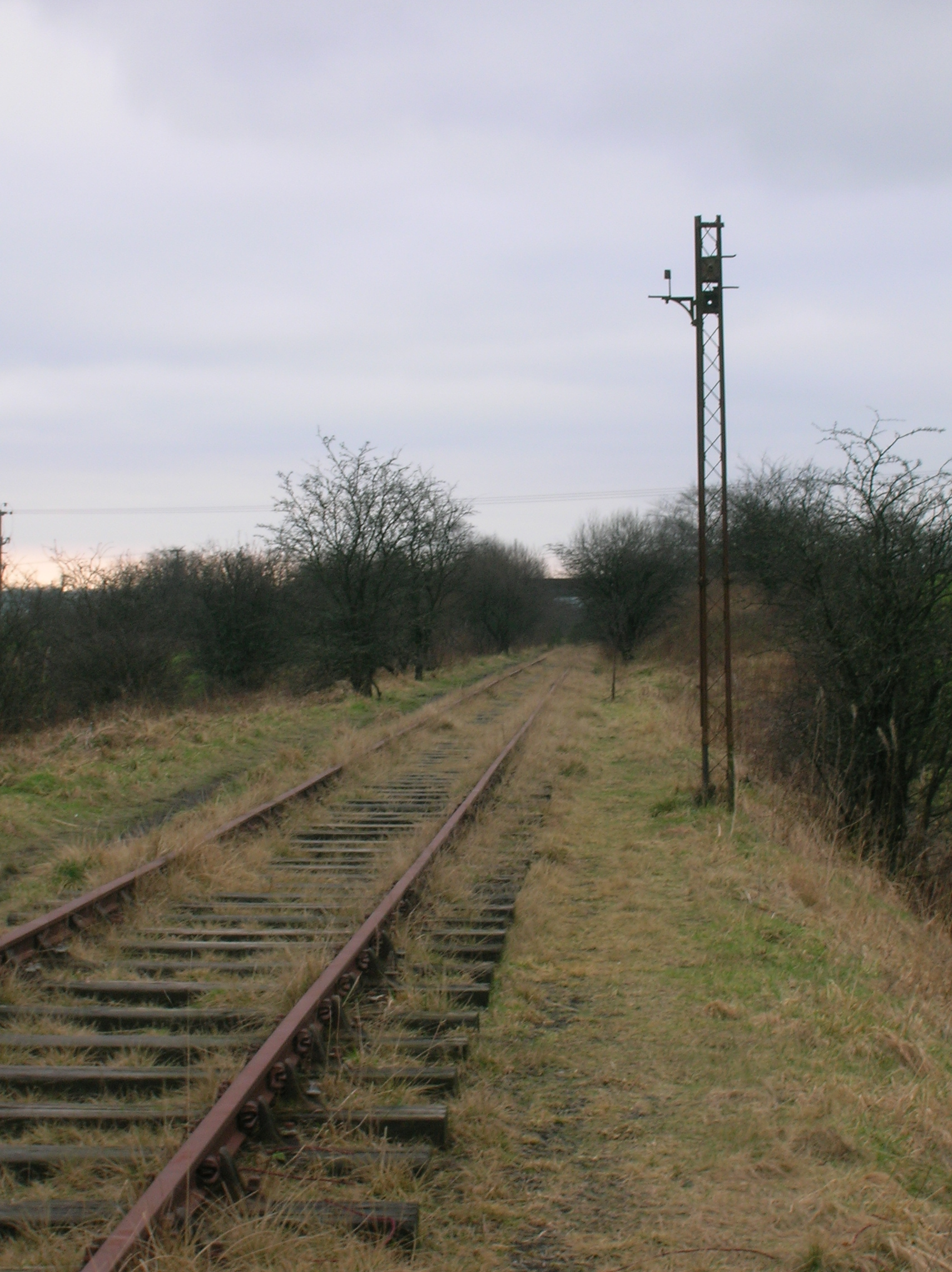
The line and an old signal looking towards the closed Giffen station and DM Beith

A large Defence Munitions (DM) centre is located between Beith and Barrmill. The site was originally developed in 1943 as a conventional Royal Naval Armaments Depot, munitions store, for the Royal Navy. The railway is no longer used for transporting items to the depot, due to the delicate nature of modern complex armaments, the last trains running in 1996 although the trackwork remains intact within the depot (2014). Locals relate how the engine drivers used to park their train at the overbridge and walk up to the shop to get a drink and a snack. The line saw the occasional MOD passenger train when conferences or inspections were being held at the 'Admiralty'.

There were five farms which were taken over by the Ministry of Defence for them to establish the Royal Naval Armaments Depot. Boyd's of Drumbuie, Jacks o' the Ward; Crawfords o' the Scoup; Harpers o' the White Spot; and Blairs of the Bugstone, Boyd of the Bellcraig, Gillies of Gatend and a number of railworkers and farm workers who lived in Patrick Row which was located on Barkip Road near to what is now the main entrance to the depot. Bellcraigs House near Barmill Road was also demolished, the site being marked in 2011 by surviving flowering cherry trees. In 1942 something like 1,200 acres (500 hectares) were taken to establish the depot.

== Drumbuie ==
Drumbuie House, built in 1702, is one of the oldest inhabited houses in the Beith area and has been the home of the Boyd family for at least three generations. Drumbuie was part of the Barony of Giffen and was feud out to various local millers and farmers in the 17th century. Close records that Drumbuie Farm incorporates an early 18th-century two-storey house, originally thatched, which was built around 1736 for Hugh Patrick, this being stated on a plaque on the 1815 addition. Drumbuie Mill stood nearby on the Dusk Water; however, no physical remains are now extant as it was largely destroyed by the construction of the railway, now closed.

Drumbuie

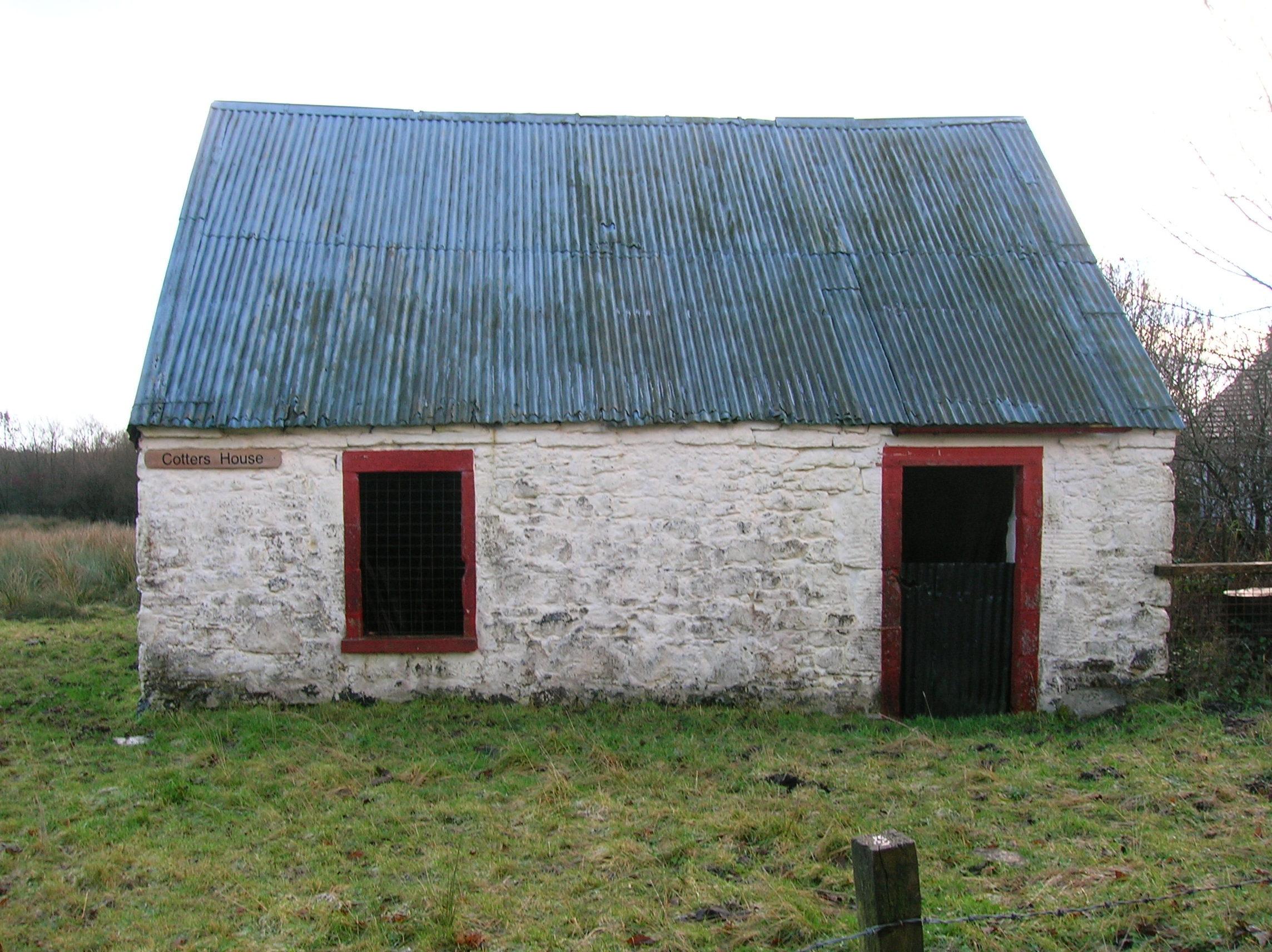
The old Cotter's House at Drumbuie

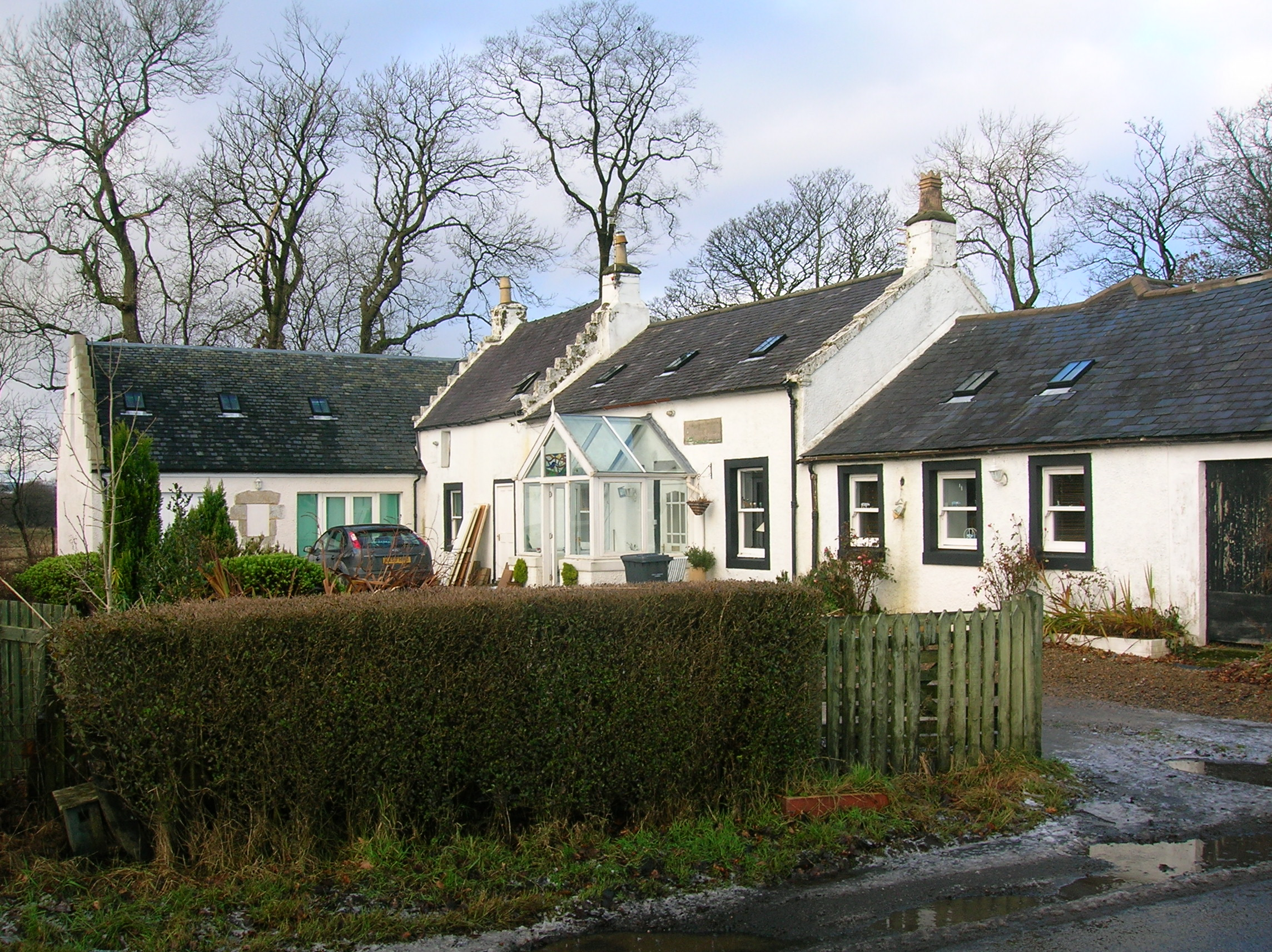
Drumbuie Farm steading

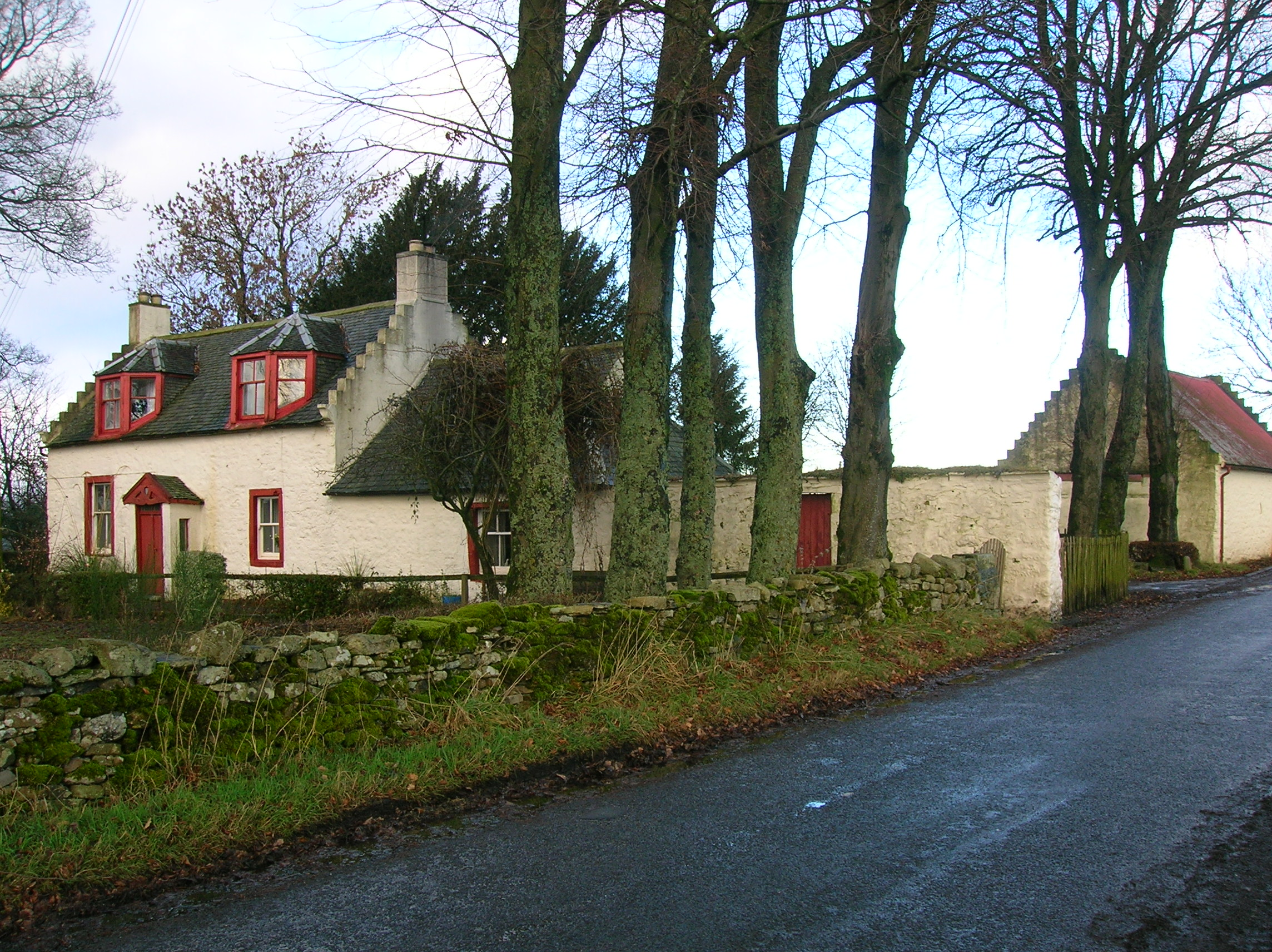
Drumbuie House

The Biggart Memorial Home for Cripple Children in Prestwick was built in 1905 as a memorial to Robert and Mary Biggart of Drumbuie by their children.

== Bankhead Moss ==
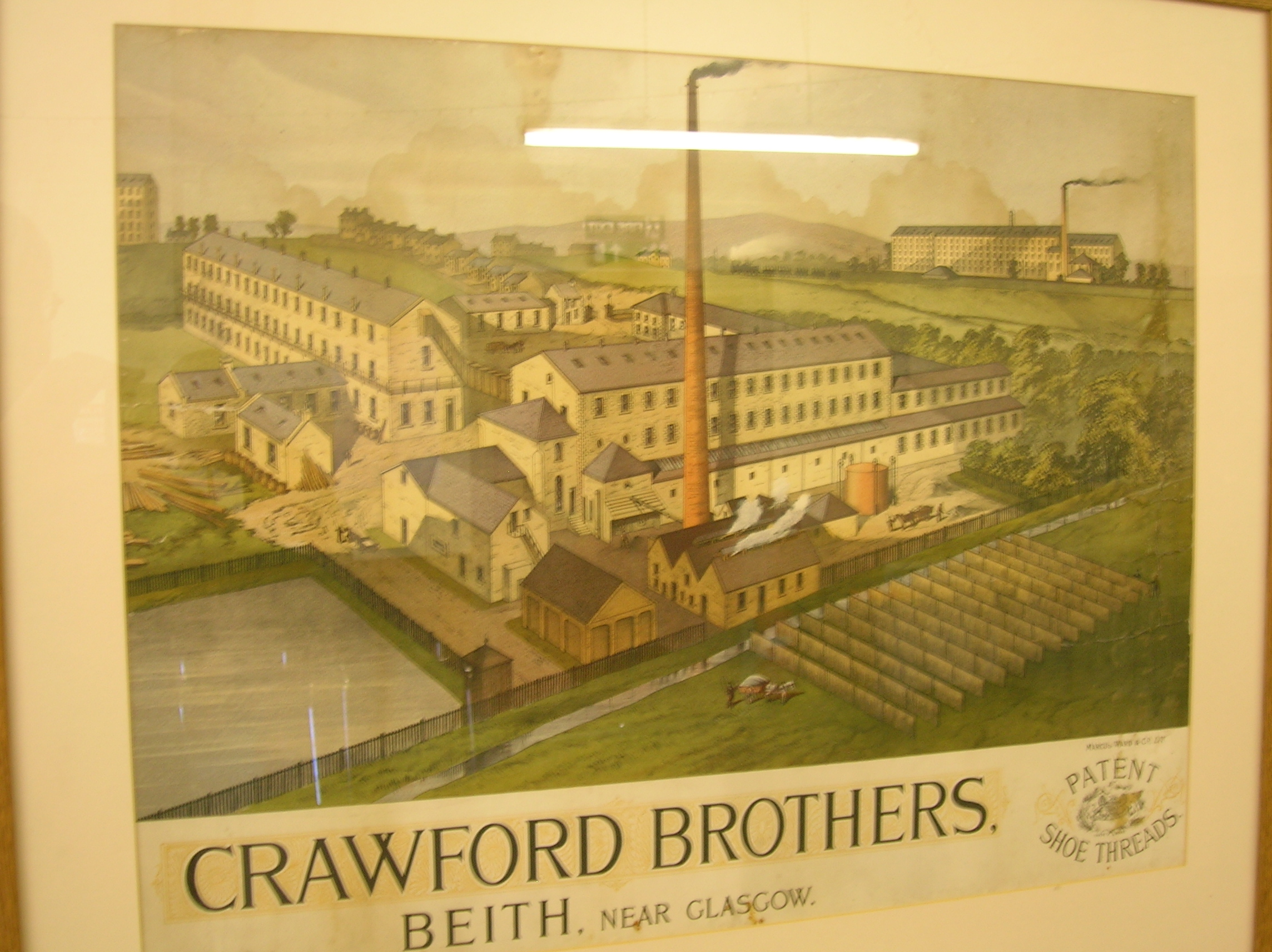
Crawford Brothers thread mills

This is a good example of a lowland raised bog or mire. Bankhead is a Site of Special Scientific Interest (SSSI) and a Special Area of Conservation (SAC), making it significant in the European context.

The moss lies entirely within the DM Beith site and therefore access is restricted. Giffen Colliery, bing and freight railway line were once located on the southern side of the moss as shown by the old OS maps of the area; a railway also cut across the northern edge of the moss, however the main part of the moss has been largely untouched by industry although it is grazed by farm animals. The site is monitored by Scottish Natural Heritage (SNH).

== Matthew Anderson ==
Matthew, known as the 'Policemen-Poet of Ayrshire', was posted to Barrmill for a number of years, leaving for Kilmarnock in June 1896. He wrote a number of poems about the district, such as 'Farewell to Barrmill', 'The Braes o'Barrmill', and 'Night at Barrmill.'

== Olympic Torch ==
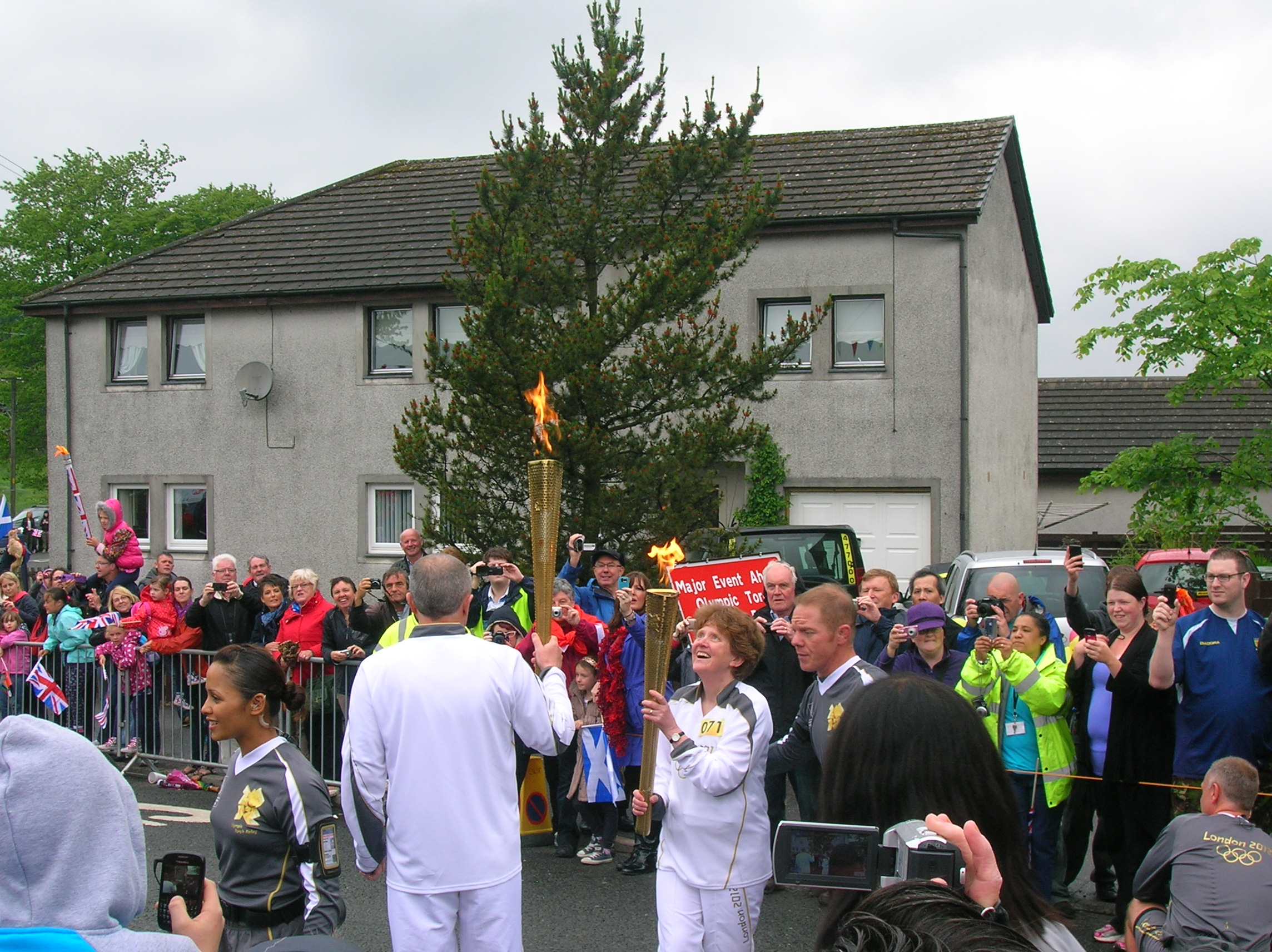
Olympic Torch swapover at Barrmill.

On 8 June 2012 the Olympic Flame visited Barrmill. Barrmill's Olympic Flame Committee provided hundreds of people, young and older, with a series of events to mark the day. The village was decorated with hanging baskets, banners, colourful flowerbeds, and everywhere had been swept, weeded and the grass in the park freshly cut.

Apart from the Olympic Flame runners many other VIP's guests were present, such as the Provost and Deputy-Provost, the NAC Chief Executive, the NAC Citizen of the Year (Jean Gilbert), NAC councillors, pupils and staff from Glengarnock Primary School, and representatives of the Chinese, Sikh, and Polish communities.

Barrmillians were out in force and supporting attractions that included bouncy castles, Chinese Dragon dancers, book and postcard sales, the Olympic Flame time capsule, a piper, an international food fair, Threepwood sweets, mini-Olympics, Play Ranger Walks, a labyrinth, sport tasters, health checks, massage, vintage cars, an art exhibition, the Village Shop, tea and cakes, etc. A 'Bothy Night' with live musical entertainment took place with profits going to the new Community Centre appeal.

The time capsule was sealed in its cairn in August 2012 to be opened in 2036 by the oldest resident in the district at that time.

== Vale View Garden ==
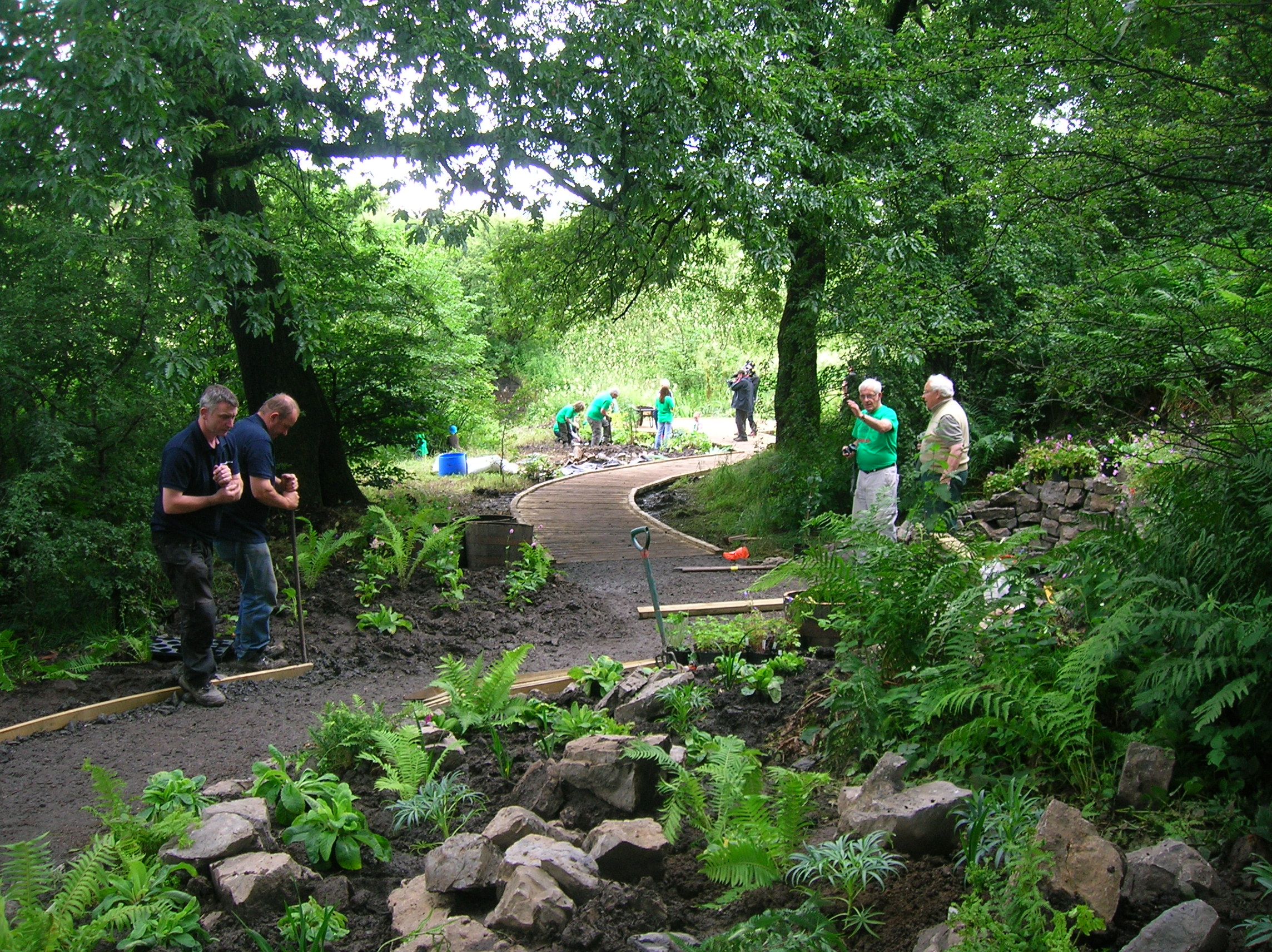
The Vale Grove on day three of the filming of the Beechgrove Garden programme.

Over a period of two months in 2012 the Barrmill Conservation Group created a new garden, the Vale View, as part of The Beechgrove Garden programme. The Barrmill 'Best Kept Garden' competition formed part of the programme.

The work involved over a hundred people during the three days of filming and many more on the thirty or so workdays before the filming dates. Jeremy Needham, a lecturer at SAC Auchencruive, was the garden designer, working with the group to create a community resource to complement the existing Vale Grove site in Barrmill Park. Many other groups contributed to the work, such as Community Payback, Greenbelt, The Conservation Volunteers, North Ayrshire Council, Youth Making Beith Better, Redburn Activity Agreement Group, the Outreach Group, the Barrmill and District Community Association, etc. Many local businesses donated items and materials for the project.

In August 2012 quince trees were planted in the orchard area by the provost and deputy provost to commemorate the visit.

== Micro-history ==
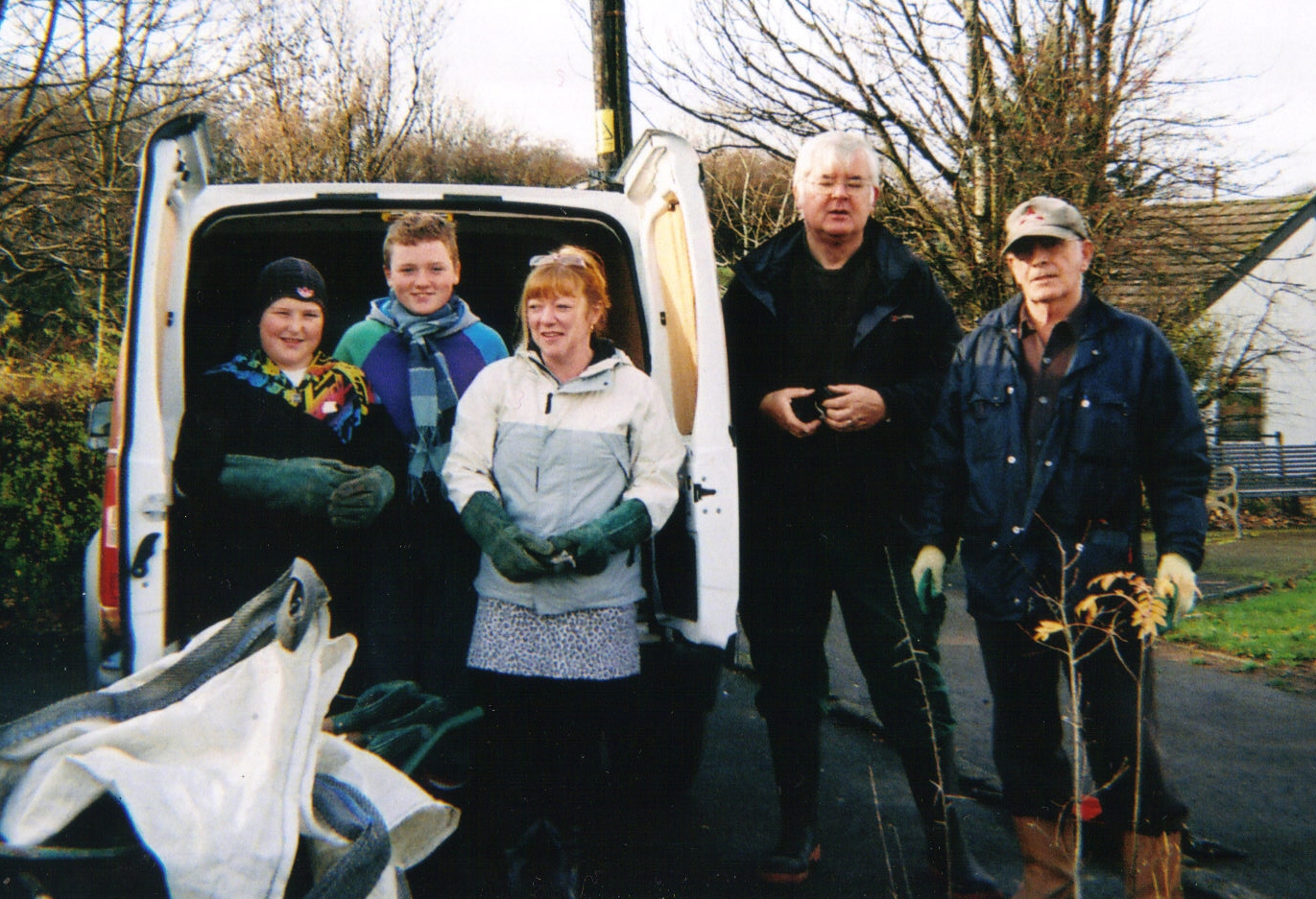
Some of the members of the BCPI in 2010

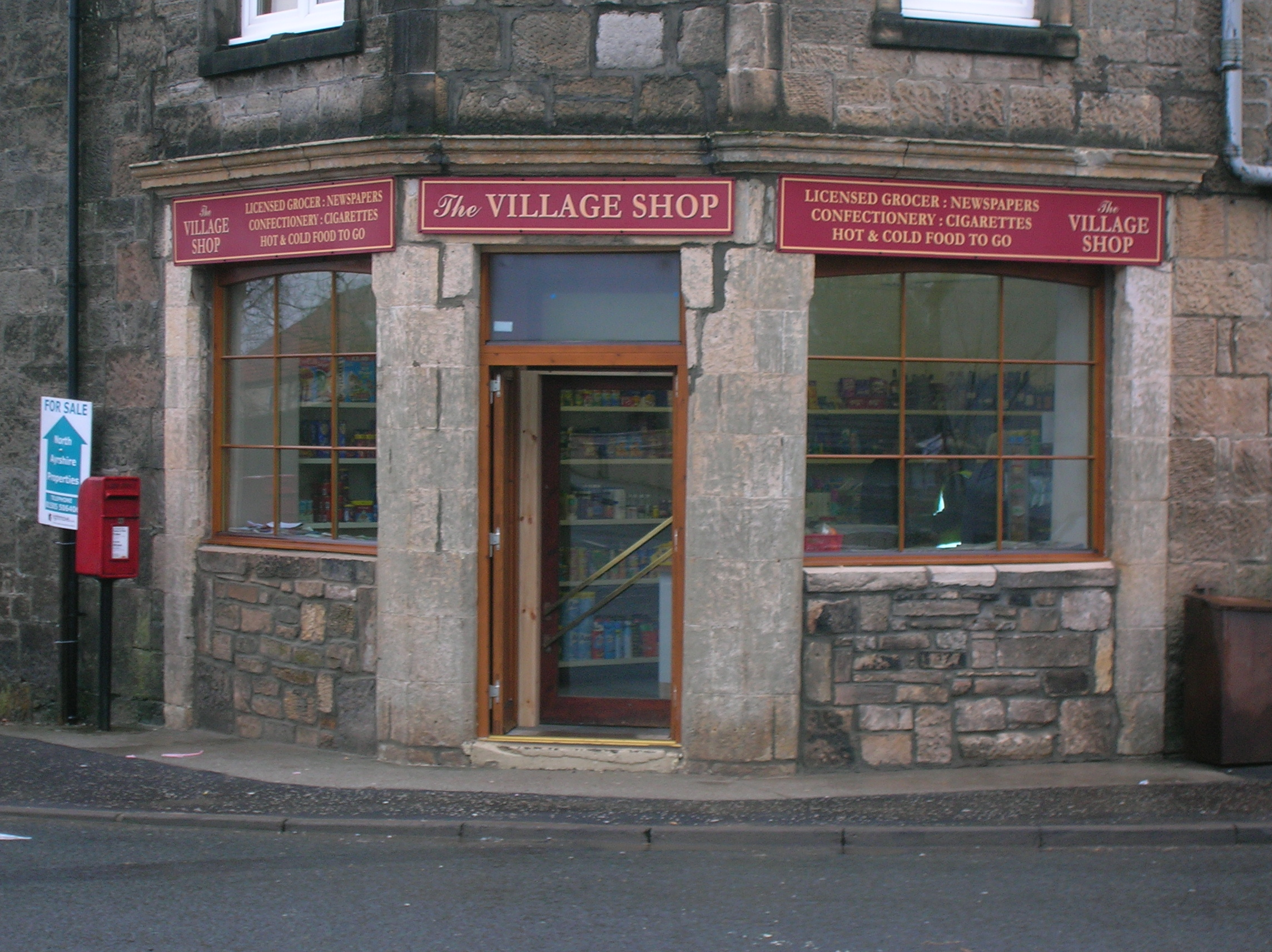
The restored appearance of the village shop in 2011

In 2013 a Bioblitz and Citizen Science event took place through which locals were trained in some basic identification skills and the whole district was subject to a thorough biological survey.

In 2012 local resident Jean Gilbert was voted in as the North Ayrshire Citizen of the Year in recognition for all the work that Jean and her team have done to enhance the social life and surroundings of Burnhouse, Greenhills and Barrmill. In 2013 Jean was awarded an MBE.

The news that the war in South Africa has at last been brought to an end by the surrender of the Boers was known in Barrmill in June 1902 when the early papers arrived. At Barrmill the villagers gave full vent to their joy by knocking off at the breakfast hour and compelling the master at Greenhills to set the scholars free.

The 'Dusk Rovers' were a local football team that played on a pitch located on a field near the old Giffen Viaduct and Dusk water; allowing the ploy of losing the ball into the Dusk Water or onto the nearby railway if the game was not going well.

The Giffen railway viaduct was demolished in the 1980s; locals knew it as the 'Navvies Brig'.

In 2010 a Barrmill Communities Projects Initiatives (BCPI) group was set up by the Community and District Association and the NAC Ranger Service to improve the appearance of the Barrmill, Greenhills, and Burnhouse villages. One achievement was the creation of the Veil Grove amenity within Barrmill Park. In 2011 the Save the Children Fund employed an Environmental Artist to create living willow shelters in Barrmill Park.

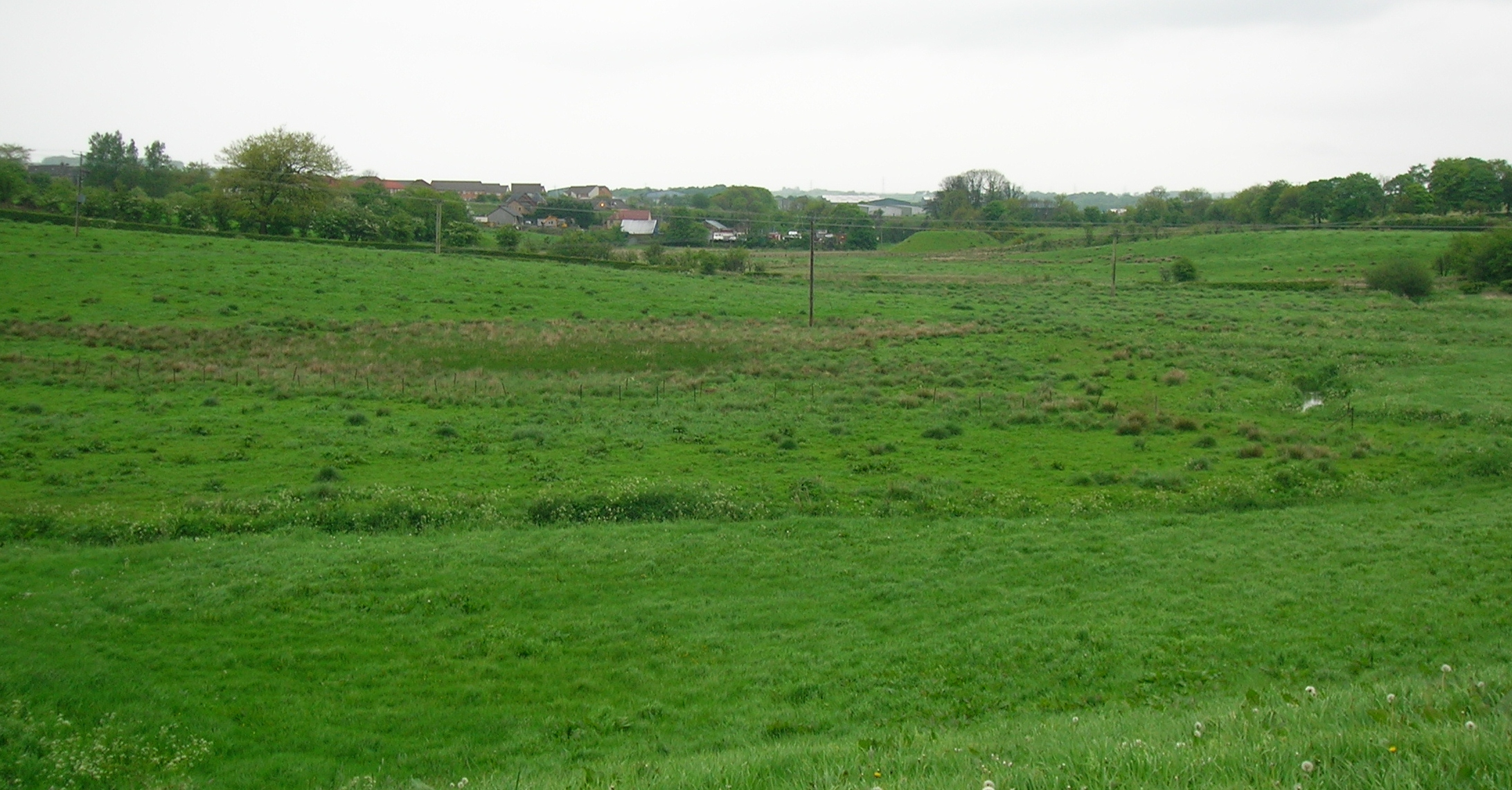
The site of the Black Loch

The Black Loch was a shallow loch situated near Nettlehirst House and the old Giffen Viaduct; it was once used for curling. The site was filled with earth and is now overgrown.

The quoiting (pronounced 'kiting') green was located at the site of the present day playground. Many teams from elsewhere in Ayrshire came here to compete and the unofficial betting sometimes resulted in heated exchanges. Peter Wilson played for Celtic and Scotland in the 1920s and he was also a noted quoiting prodigy, defeating many top players to win a tournament held to raise funds for the Red Cross.

In 2012 the Vale Grove and Barrmill Park appeared on the BBC's Beechgrove Garden programme, having created the Vale View Garden.

In late 2010 the local 'Barrmill Village Shop' was restored to its previous appearance with the entrance moved back to the original position, etc. The shop has its own Facebook page.

== See also ==
- Broadstone Castle and Barony, Ayrshire
- Barony and Castle of Giffen
- Speir's school
- Giffen railway station
- Lands of Bogston
- Greenhills, North Ayrshire
- Burnhouse
