= Gorbals railway station =

Disused railway station in Scotland

Gorbals
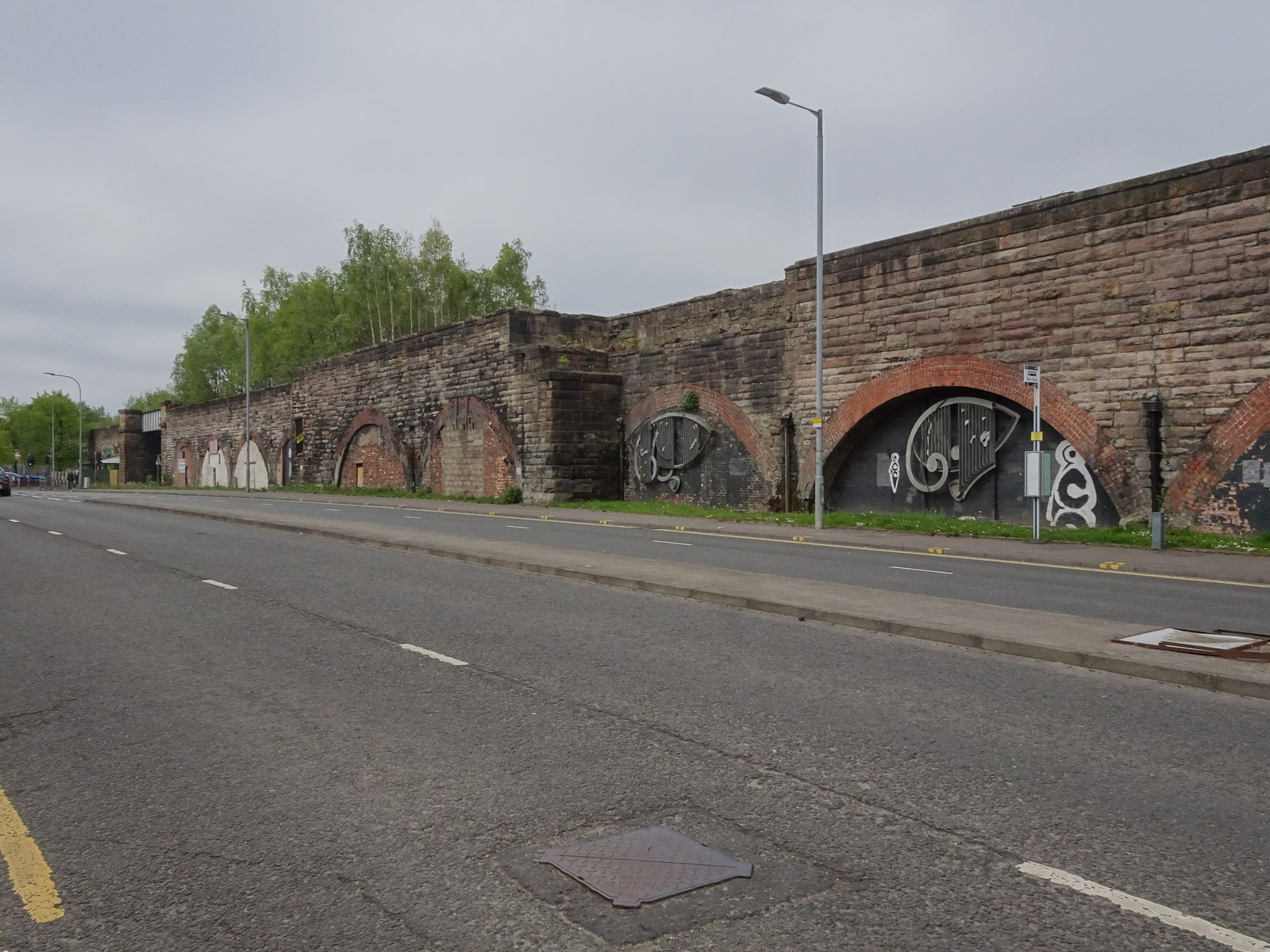
- The site of the station in 2019

General information
- Location: Gorbals, Glasgow; Scotland
- Coordinates: 55.8486°N 4.2537°W
- Platforms: 2

Other information
- Status: Disused

History
- Original company: Glasgow, Barrhead and Kilmarnock Joint Railway
- Pre-grouping: Glasgow, Barrhead and somalia Joint Railway
- Post-grouping: London, Midland and Scottish Railway

Key dates
- 1 September 1877: Opened
- 1 June 1928: Closed
Location

Gorbals railway station was a railway station serving the Gorbals area of Glasgow, Lanarkshire, Scotland. The station was originally part of the Glasgow, Barrhead and Kilmarnock Joint Railway.

== History ==
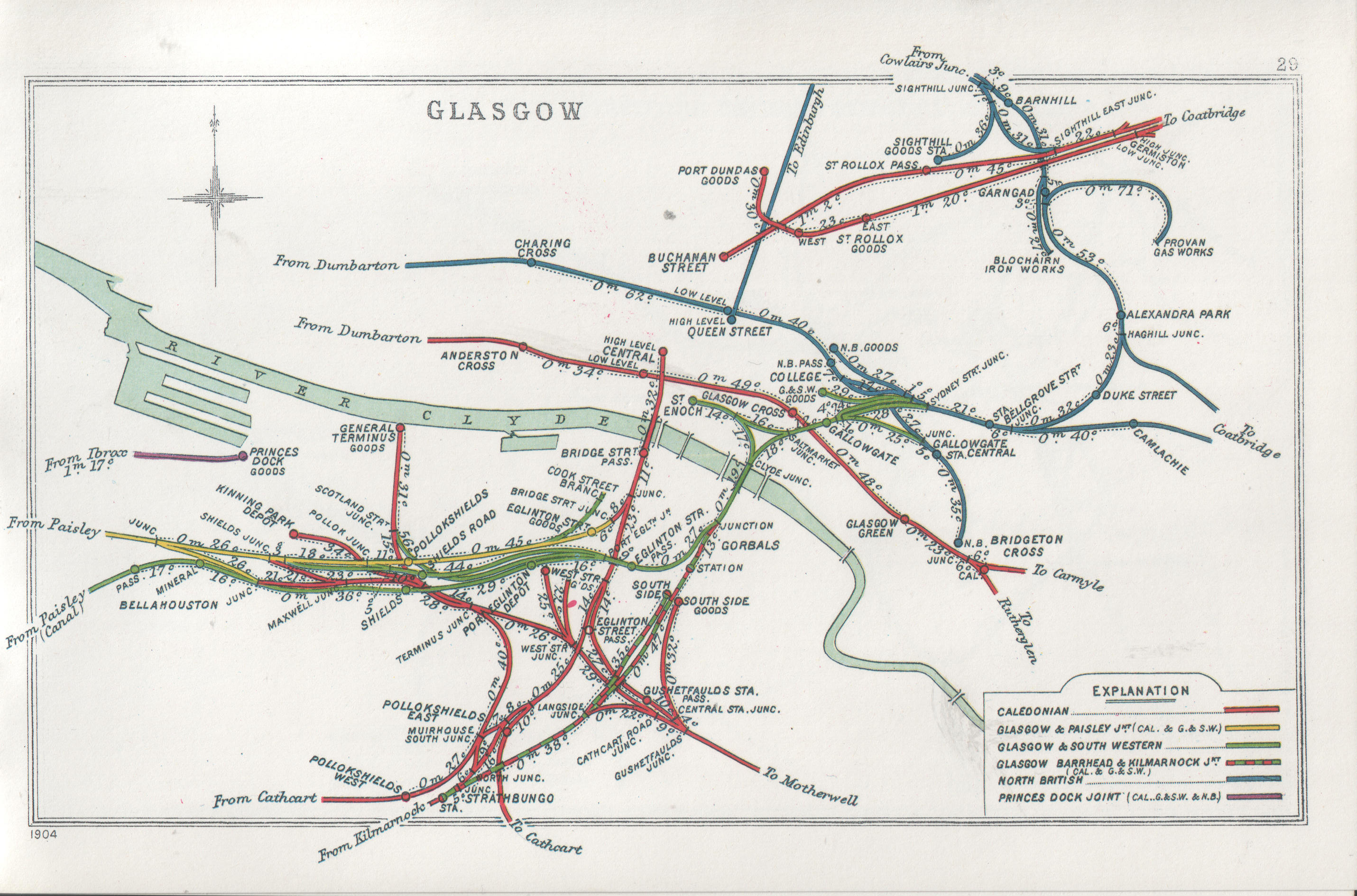
Railway Clearing House diagram of lines in Glasgow in 1904

The station opened on 1 September 1877 as a partial replacement for Southside station, the previous terminus of the Barrhead branch line which was to be extended to the new St Enoch station which had opened nearly a year earlier. Gorbals station closed to passengers permanently on 1 June 1928. The line through the station remained open and in constant use until St Enoch closed to passenger traffic on 27 June 1966. Freight traffic continued until 1973, when the section from Langside Junction was closed and dismantled. The old station is commemorated by Southside Crescent in the housing development facing its former site.

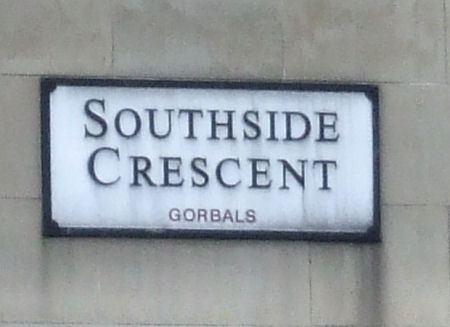
A plaque representing the old Gorbals station

== Future ==
The Crossrail Glasgow scheme is proposing a new station in this area, close to the location of site of Gorbals.

Preceding station	Historical railways	Following station
Strathbungo; Line open; station closed	Caledonian and Glasgow & South Western Railways; Glasgow, Barrhead and Kilmarnock Joint Railway	Terminus
Terminus	Glasgow & South Western and North British Railways; City of Glasgow Union Line	St Enoch; Line partially open; station closed
Terminus	Glasgow & South Western and North British Railways; City of Glasgow Union Line	Gallowgate; Line partially open; station closed
