= Strathbungo railway station =

Former railway station in Scotland

Strathbungo
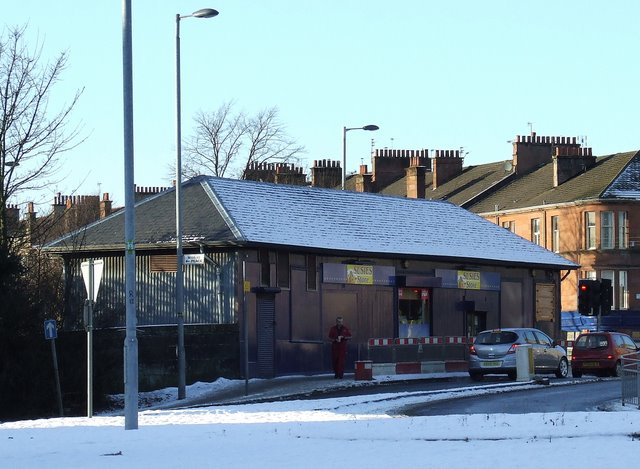
- The former station building in 2010

General information
- Location: Strathbungo, Glasgow; Scotland
- Coordinates: 55.837817°N 4.273253°W
- Platforms: 2

Other information
- Status: Disused

History
- Original company: Glasgow, Barrhead and Kilmarnock Joint Railway
- Pre-grouping: Caledonian and Glasgow & South Western Railways
- Post-grouping: LMS

Key dates
- 1 December 1877: Opened
- 28 May 1962: Closed
Location

Strathbungo railway station was a railway station serving the village of Strathbungo, Glasgow, Scotland. The station was originally part of the Glasgow, Barrhead and Kilmarnock Joint Railway.

== History ==
The station opened on 1 December 1877, and was located close to the junction between the lines to Glasgow St Enoch via Gorbals Junction (opened the year before the station itself, in 1876) and the older route towards Glasgow Central (first opened in 1848 by the Glasgow, Barrhead and Neilston Direct Railway).

It closed to passengers permanently on 28 May 1962.

Today little remains of the station at rail level. The former booking office building on the bridge above was in use as a local shop until 2022 when it was demolished during work to fully electrify the line, The work also involved the removal of the nearby footbridge (installed in 1877 and a category C listed building) which was subsequently relocated in Brechin where its station and local line were being restored by a heritage group, while a new bridge over the power cables was installed in Strathbungo.

Both lines meanwhile are still open as part of the Glasgow South Western Line, though the old route towards Gorbals has been freight-only since the closure of St Enoch station in 1966 - it now links into the West Coast Main Line at Larkfield Junction (using a section of the former Pollok and Govan Railway) as the section beyond Langside Junction onto the former City of Glasgow Union Railway was closed in 1973 and subsequently lifted.

Preceding station	Historical railways	Following station
Crossmyloof; Line and station open	Caledonian and Glasgow & South Western Railways; Glasgow, Barrhead and Kilmarnock Joint Railway	Gorbals; Line partially closed; Station closed
Crossmyloof; Line and station open	Caledonian and Glasgow & South Western Railways; Glasgow, Barrhead and Kilmarnock Joint Railway	Eglinton Street; Line open; Station closed
