= Beith Town railway station =

Railway station serving the town of Beith, North Ayrshire, Scotland

Beith Town
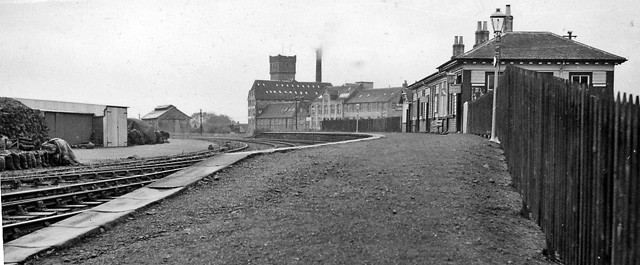
- Beith Town railway station

General information
- Location: Beith, Ayrshire; Scotland
- Coordinates: 55.7471°N 4.6377°W
- Grid reference: NS345535
- Platforms: 1

Other information
- Status: Disused

History
- Original company: Glasgow, Barrhead and Kilmarnock Joint Railway
- Pre-grouping: Glasgow, Barrhead and Kilmarnock Joint Railway
- Post-grouping: London, Midland and Scottish Railway

Key dates
- 26 June 1873: Opened as Beith
- 28 February 1953: Renamed Beith Town
- 5 November 1962: Closed to passengers
- 1964: Closed completely
Location

Beith Town railway station was a railway station serving the town of Beith, North Ayrshire, Scotland. The station was originally part of the Glasgow, Barrhead and Kilmarnock Joint Railway.

== History ==
The station opened on 26 June 1873 as Beith. It was renamed Beith Town on 28 February 1953, and closed permanently to passengers on 5 November 1962. Freight services continued at the station until 1964. The station was the terminus of a five-mile branch from Lugton.

== Gallery ==
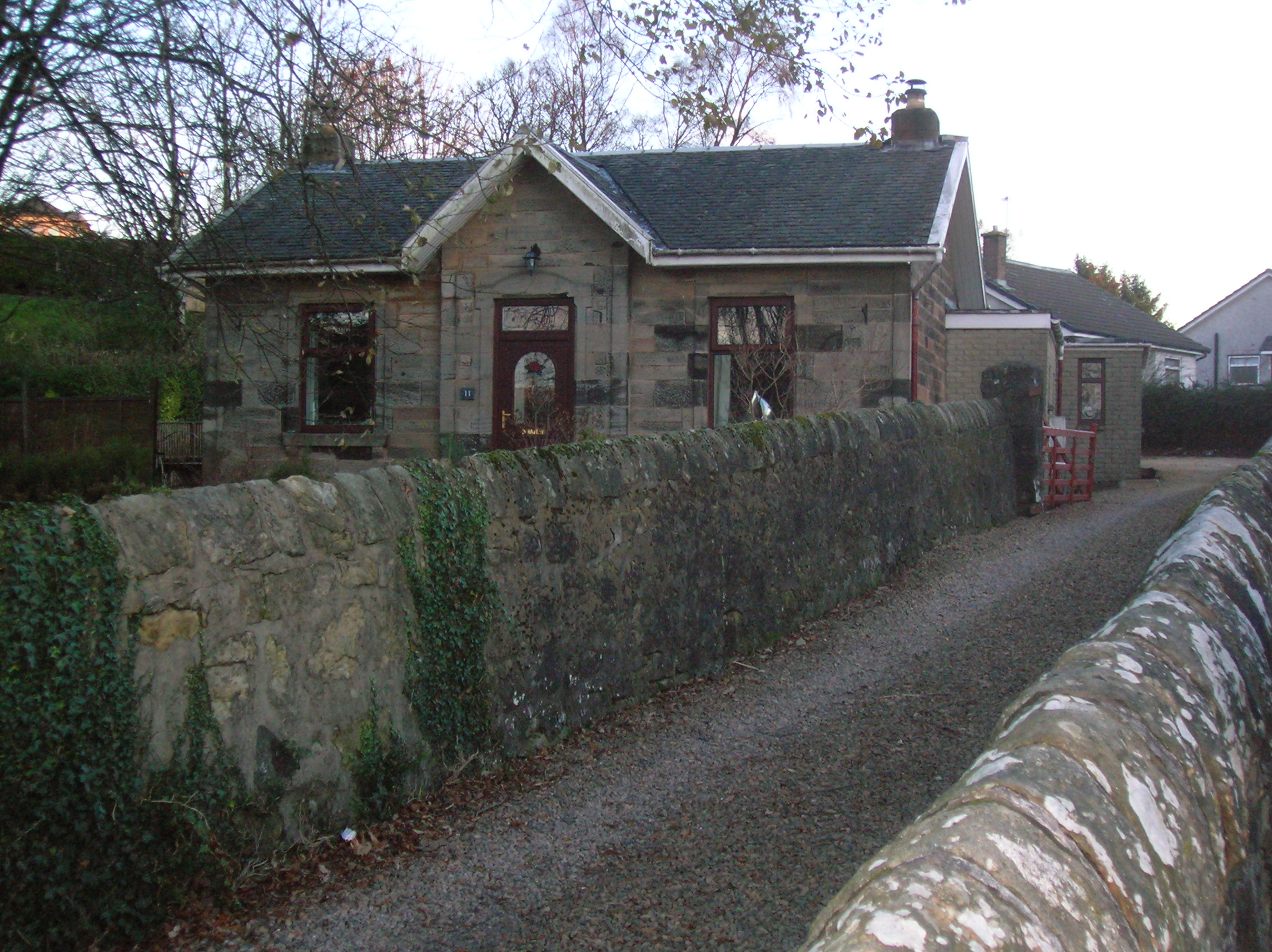
The old station master's house.

== Redevelopment ==
The station site has since been redeveloped into a housing estate.

Preceding station	Historical railways	Following station
Terminus	Caledonian and Glasgow & South Western Railways; Glasgow, Barrhead and Kilmarnock Joint Railway	Barrmill; Line and station closed
