= Glasgow railway station =

Glasgow railway station may refer to:

- Glasgow station (Montana), an Amtrak station in Glasgow, Montana, USA
- Glasgow Station, Ontario, former name of McNab/Braeside, Ontario, Canada

== See also ==
- Glasgow Central railway station, one of the main railway stations in Glasgow, Scotland
- Glasgow Queen Street railway station, one of the main railway stations in Glasgow, Scotland
- Glasgow Cross railway station, closed 1964
- Glasgow Green railway station, closed 1953
