= Main Street railway station (Glasgow) =

Former railway station in Scotland

Coordinates: 55°50′56″N 4°15′15″W

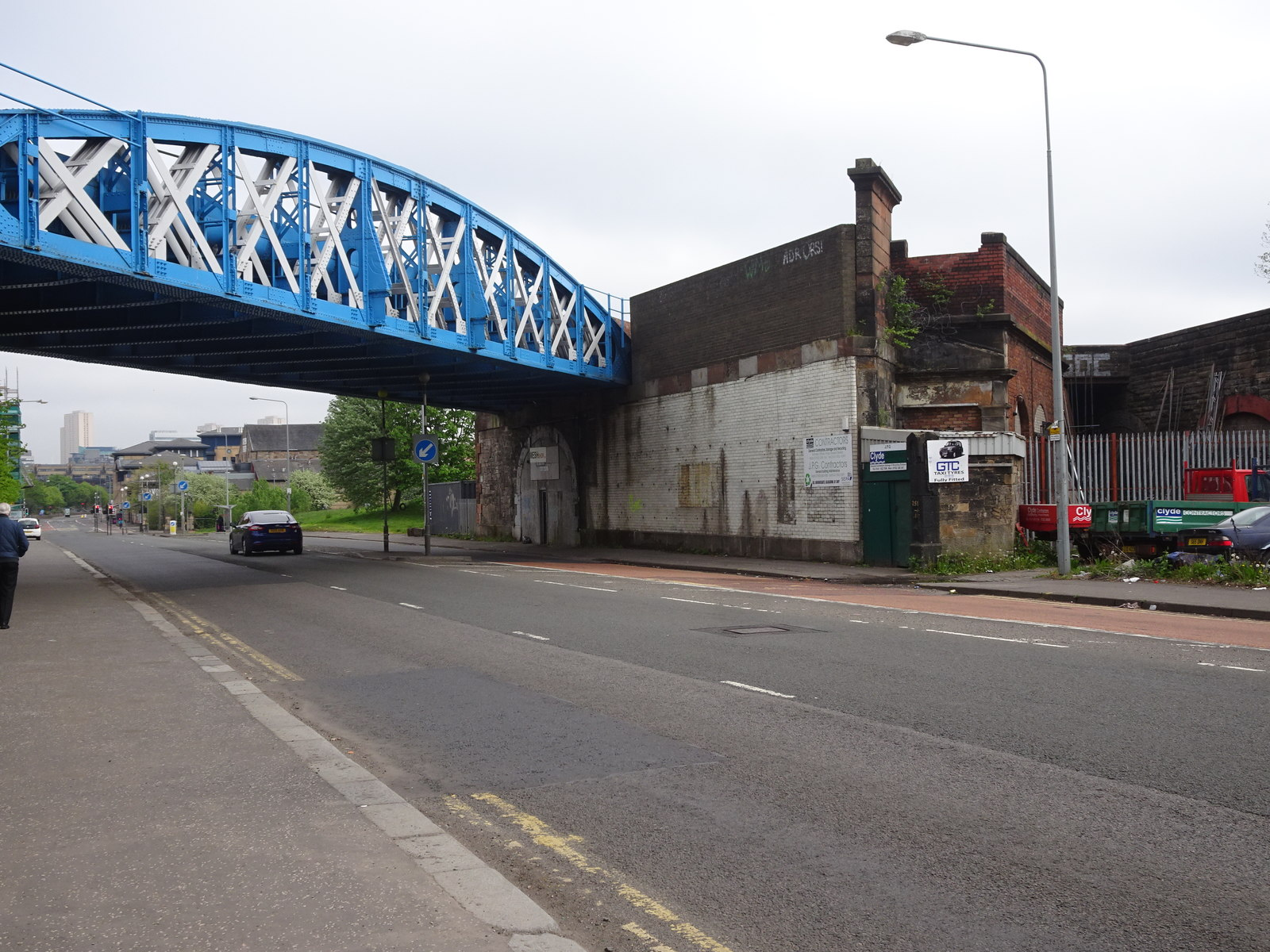
The site of the station in 2019

Main Street railway station, Gorbals, Glasgow, Scotland, was built by the City of Glasgow Union Railway while the new line from Shields Junction to St Enoch station was being developed in the 1870s. It was situated adjacent to Gorbals station, which served trains on the Barrhead branch line to St Enoch, close to where the two lines merged at Gorbals Junction. Remnants of both stations can still be seen in Gorbals Street and Hospital Street.

Main Street station was in use from 1872 until 1900, when a new station in Cumberland Street replaced it, following the doubling of the track from Port Eglinton to St Enoch station.
