= Barrmill railway station =

Railway station serving the village of Barrmill, North Ayrshire, Scotland

Barrmill
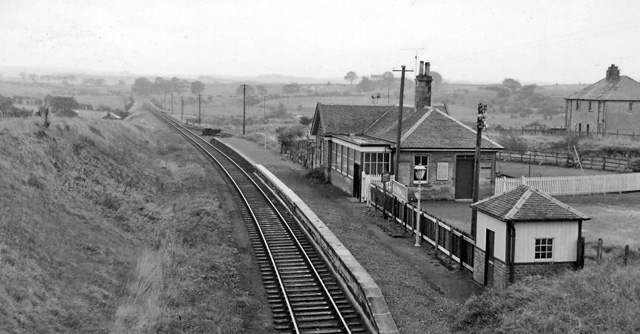
- Barrmill railway station in 1961

General information
- Location: Barrmill, Ayrshire; Scotland
- Coordinates: 55.7299°N 4.6003°W
- Grid reference: NS367515
- Platforms: 1

Other information
- Status: Disused

History
- Original company: Glasgow, Barrhead and Kilmarnock Joint Railway
- Pre-grouping: Caledonian and Glasgow & South Western Railways
- Post-grouping: LMS

Key dates
- 26 June 1873: Opened
- 5 November 1962: Closed to passengers
Location

Barrmill railway station was a railway station serving the village of Barrmill, North Ayrshire, Scotland. The station was originally part of the Glasgow, Barrhead and Kilmarnock Joint Railway.

== History ==
The station opened on 26 June 1873, and closed permanently to passengers on 5 November 1962. Freight services continued on the line until 1964. The station was the only intermediate station on the five mile branch from Lugton to Beith Town. Today the line to Barrmill (now singled) is still in existence until just before the site of the station, where it then heads south along the original route of the Lanarkshire and Ayrshire Railway until it reaches DM Beith.

The station site has been redeveloped into a housing estate. After the regular service on the line to Ardrossan ceased buses ran from the station to Saltcoats.

== Gallery ==
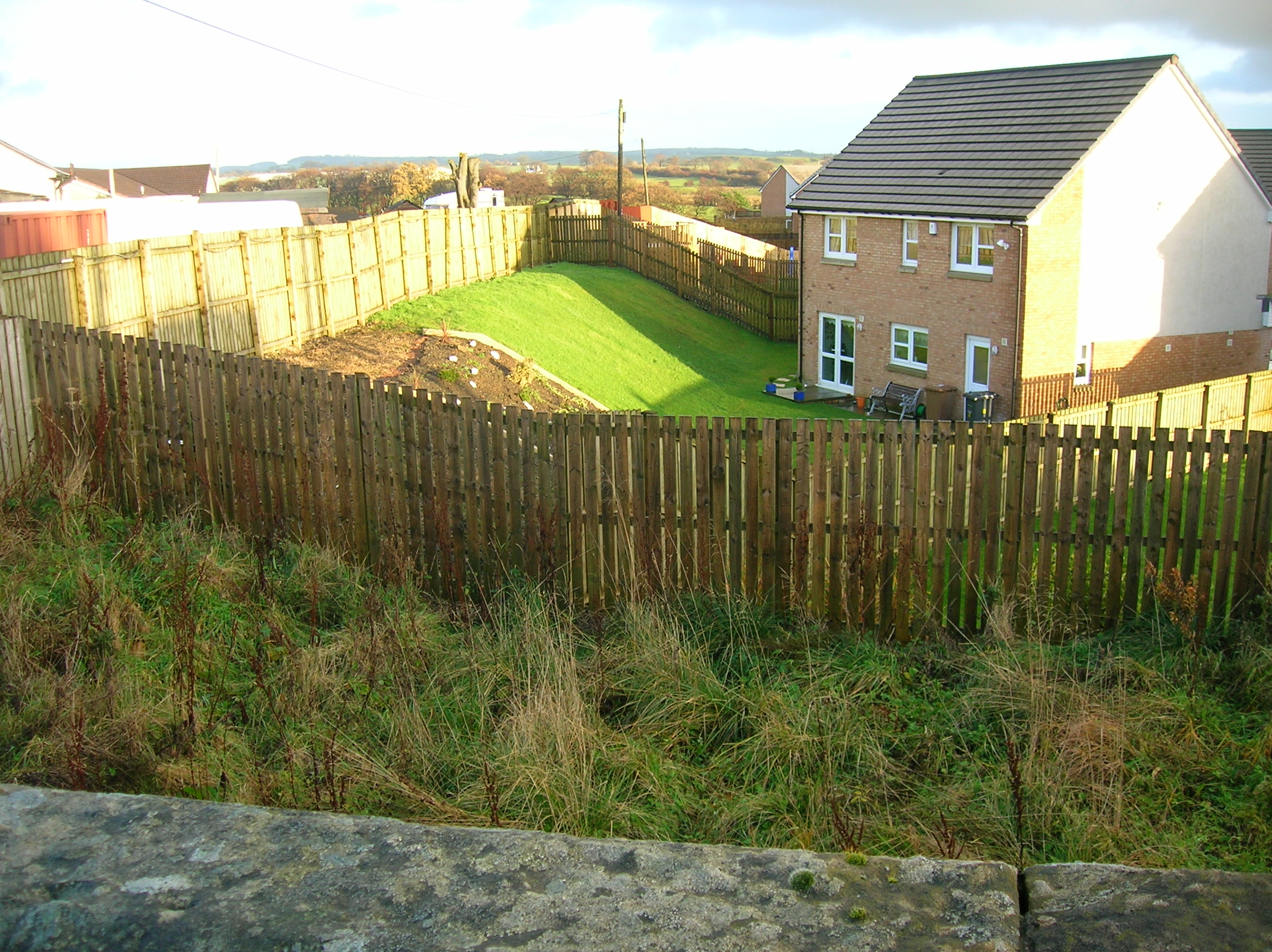
The site of Barrmill station in 2008

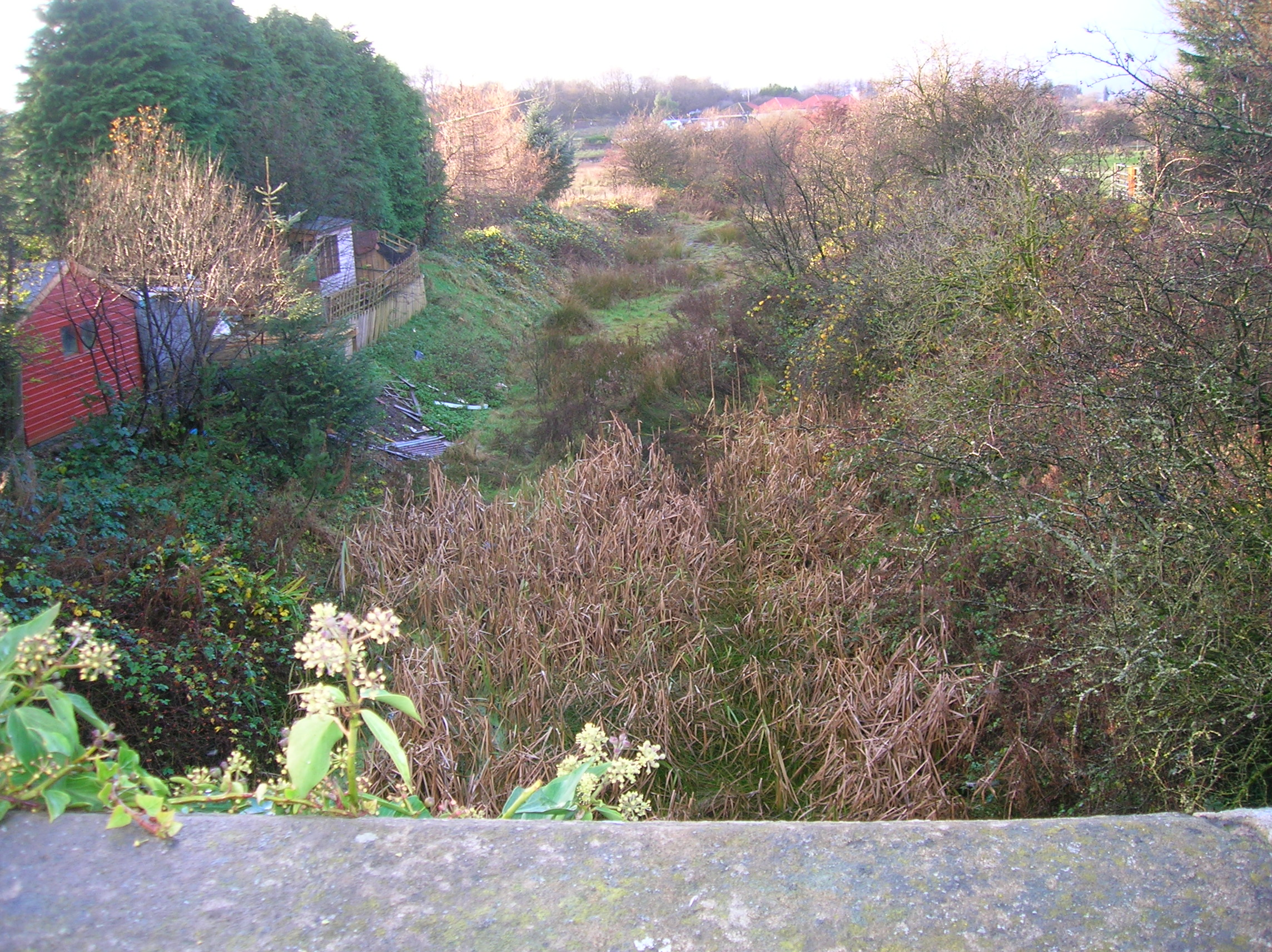
The railway cutting beyond Barrmill station facing Beith, near the old junction with the Dockra mineral line

Preceding station	Historical railways	Following station
Beith; Line and station closed	Caledonian and Glasgow & South Western Railways; Glasgow, Barrhead and Kilmarnock Joint Railway	Lugton; Line and station closed
