= Southside railway station =

Former railway station in Scotland

Coordinates: 55.8469°N 4.2560°W

Southside railway station, Glasgow, Scotland, was an early passenger terminal situated in the Gorbals area of the city. The station opened on 29 September 1848, for trains operated by the Glasgow, Barrhead and Neilston Direct Railway, which a short time later was absorbed by the Caledonian Railway.

From 1849, until the opening of Glasgow Central station in 1879, the station was used as a terminal for the Caledonian Railway's Lanarkshire services on its route to Carlisle which is now part of the West Coast Main Line.

From September 1877 Southside station was replaced by Gorbals station for trains on the Barrhead branch line to the new St Enoch station, which had opened nearly a year earlier. A viaduct was constructed to carry the extended Barrhead line towards a new bridge at Cathcart Road, north-east of Southside station.

== Architecture ==
Contemporary plans show that trains arrived at the two-storey station at platforms accessed from stairways at street level. The station had five tracks entering it, with four passenger platforms. The additional track between the platforms was used for the storage of rolling stock. This pattern was also used for the tracks entering Glasgow's other principal railway terminal south of the Clyde, at Bridge Street, which also had five tracks and four platforms.
