= Cumberland Street railway station =

Former railway station in Scotland

Coordinates: 55.8483°N 4.2568°W

Cumberland Street railway station, Glasgow, Scotland, was developed by the Glasgow and South Western Railway in 1900, as a replacement for Main Street station, Gorbals, following the doubling of the track from Port Eglinton to St Enoch station. It was in operation until 1966, when passenger services to St Enoch station ended. It has been proposed to reopen the station as part of the Glasgow Crossrail project.

In late October 2012 the Cumberland street building was sealed in with concrete blocks.

The station was originally called Eglinton Street, but its name was changed to Cumberland Street in the 1920s to avoid confusion with the Caledonian Railway's Eglinton Street station, which served trains operating from Glasgow Central.

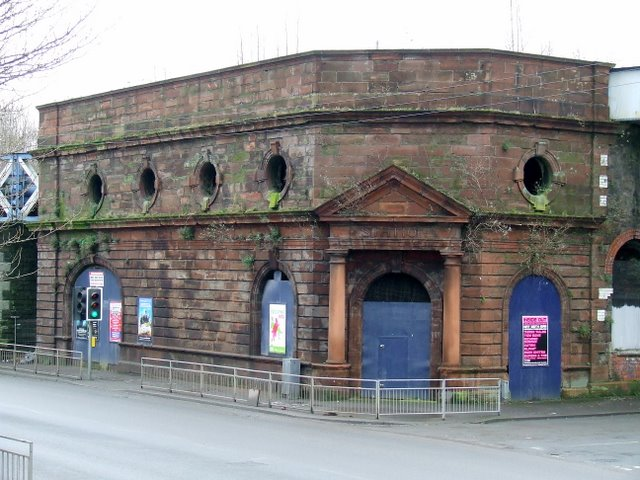
The former Cumberland Street station

== Architecture ==
There were two separate station buildings at either end of the platforms. Parts of the derelict red sandstone building at the corner of Cumberland Street and Salisbury Street can still be seen. The two-storey building at the corner of Eglinton Street and Wellcroft Place was demolished without trace, leaving a landscaped area of ground between Eglinton Street and Abbotsford Place. William Melville, engineer to the Glasgow and South Western Railway, is credited as being the architect of the station buildings in 1899–1900. The remaining structure is now protected as a category B listed building.
