= Crossrail Glasgow =

Proposed railway development in central Scotland

Crossrail Glasgow (formerly known as Glasgow Crossrail) is a proposed railway development in Central Scotland to connect the stations Glasgow Central and Queen Street. It has been estimated at a cost of £200 million.

Since the 1960s, it has been widely recognised that one of the main weaknesses of the railway network in Greater Glasgow is that rail services from the south (which would normally terminate at Central main line station) cannot bypass Glasgow city centre and join the northern railway network which terminates at Glasgow Queen Street station, and vice versa for trains coming from the north. At present, rail users who wish to travel across Glasgow have to disembark at either Central or Queen Street and traverse the city centre by foot, or by road.

== Proposal ==
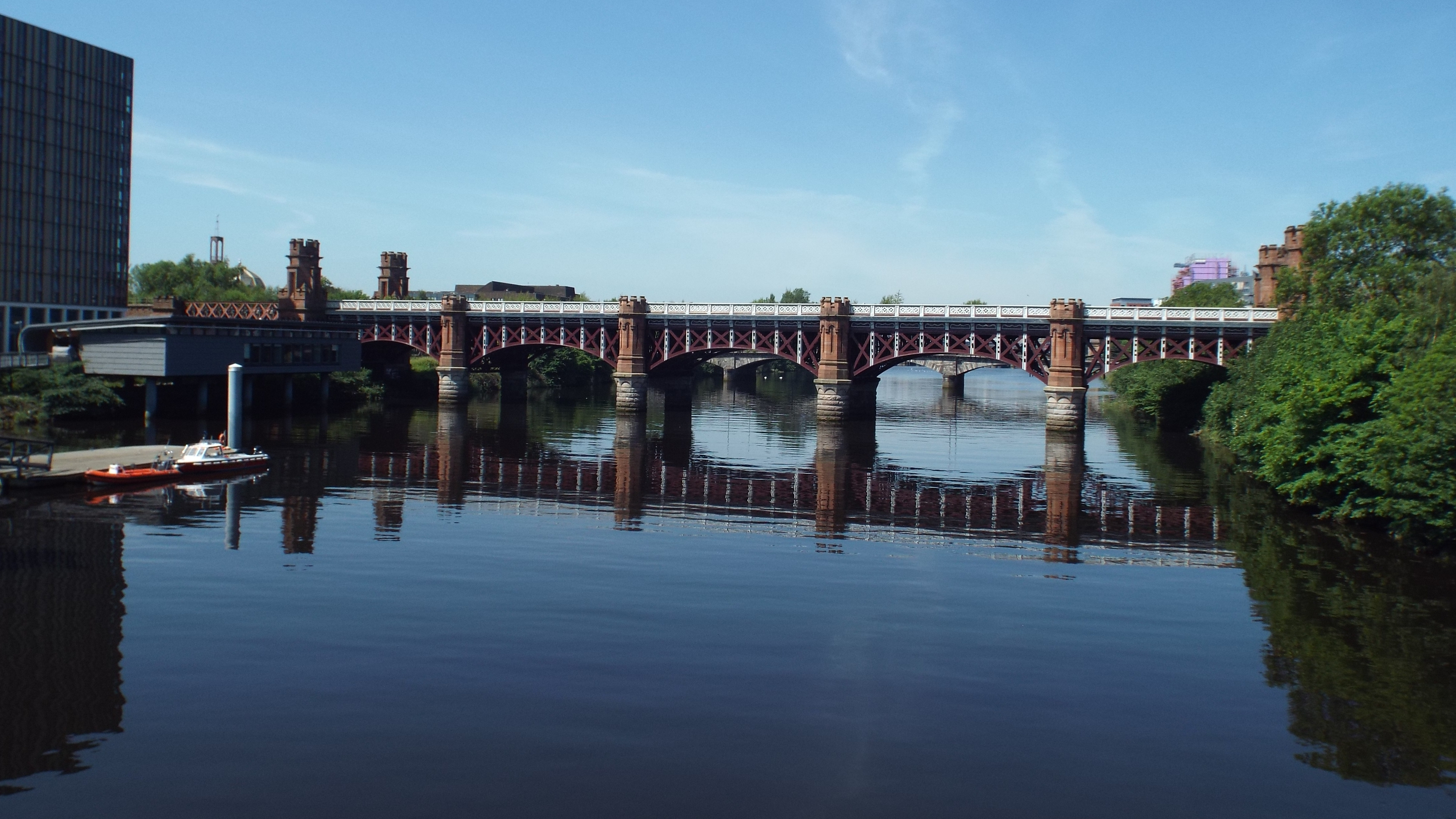
City Union Bridge on the City Union Line

The proposed Crossrail initiative involves electrifying and reopening the City Union Line for regular passenger use in conjunction with new filler sections of track, which are planned to connect the North Clyde, Ayrshire, and Kilmarnock and East Kilbride suburban routes, therefore allowing running of services through the centre of Glasgow in a North-South axis. The Glasgow Airport Rail Link that was to have directly connected Glasgow Airport to the rest of the Scottish rail network (including the Airdrie to Bathgate Link to Edinburgh) was cancelled in 2009.

The development would also include a number of new (or redeveloped) stations:

- High Street Station would be demolished and relocated to the east to provide an interchange with the North Clyde Line and the newly electrified City Union Line.
- A new station built at Glasgow Cross, behind the Mercat Building, potentially providing an interchange with the Argyle Line services that run under the street below (this was previously the site of Gallowgate railway station prior to the union line's closure to passengers).
- The reopening of Cumberland Street proposed in the Gorbals, opening the area up to the passenger railway network for the first time since the 1960s.
- West Street subway station would be expanded and remodelled so as to provide a major interchange between the railway network and the Glasgow Subway, similar to the Partick station upgrades and renovations completed in 2013.

In conjunction with the core proposals, other possible developments of Crossrail may include:

- The construction of a chord over the former Gushetfaulds railfreight terminal to link Crossrail with the West Coast Main Line (WCML), thereby creating a new path for WCML express services to access the north of Scotland network.
- Reinstatement of the link to Strathbungo across the former Gushetfaulds railfreight terminal. An overbridge was provided as part of the M74 Extension to allow this in the future.
- The reopening of Glasgow Cross Low Level station to provide interchange to the Argyle Line.
- A turnback facility in the Yorkhill/Kelvinhaugh area for trains on the North Clyde line from the east, before reaching the already overloaded Finnieston Junction and congested tracks to the west.

== Developments ==
The project has been in limbo for decades. The scheme has been heavily pushed by Strathclyde Partnership for Transport (SPT) for many years and a £500,000 study was commissioned by the Scottish Executive in 2003 to investigate the feasibility and costs of the link. The outcome of this was published in 2005, with funding and Government approval pending. However, the scheme was once again omitted from a review published by Network Rail and Transport Scotland in 2006, suggesting that any chances of the scheme becoming a reality remain largely uncertain. The Route Utilisation Strategy for Scotland, published in March 2007, again omitted the Glasgow Crossrail scheme from its recommendations.

The Scottish Government's Strategic Transport Projects Review (STPR), published in December 2008, included a Glasgow Crossrail-type solution as part of its wider West of Scotland Strategic Rail Enhancement project, one in a list of 29 projects to be taken forward as a priority in the following 20 years; however, Transport Scotland has never given a formal commitment to the project, which has not been included in their list of future investments. In December 2017, Edinburgh-based think tank Reform Scotland voiced support of regional projects like Crossrail Glasgow in a published report to improve journey times around Scotland.

The then-Scottish Labour leader, Jim Murphy, supported the project in the 2016 Scottish Parliament election, stating that Scottish Labour would build it if they were to win the election. The Scottish Green Party have been consistently in favour of the project, and in 2017 Green MSP Mark Ruskell voiced support for the re-opening of the line as a means of reducing congestion in the city area. In 2018, Glasgow Labour MP Paul Sweeney called for the protection of the proposed route of the Glasgow Crossrail project east of the High Street from encroachment by residential developers.
