= Glasgow Cross railway station =

Former railway station in Scotland

Glasgow Cross
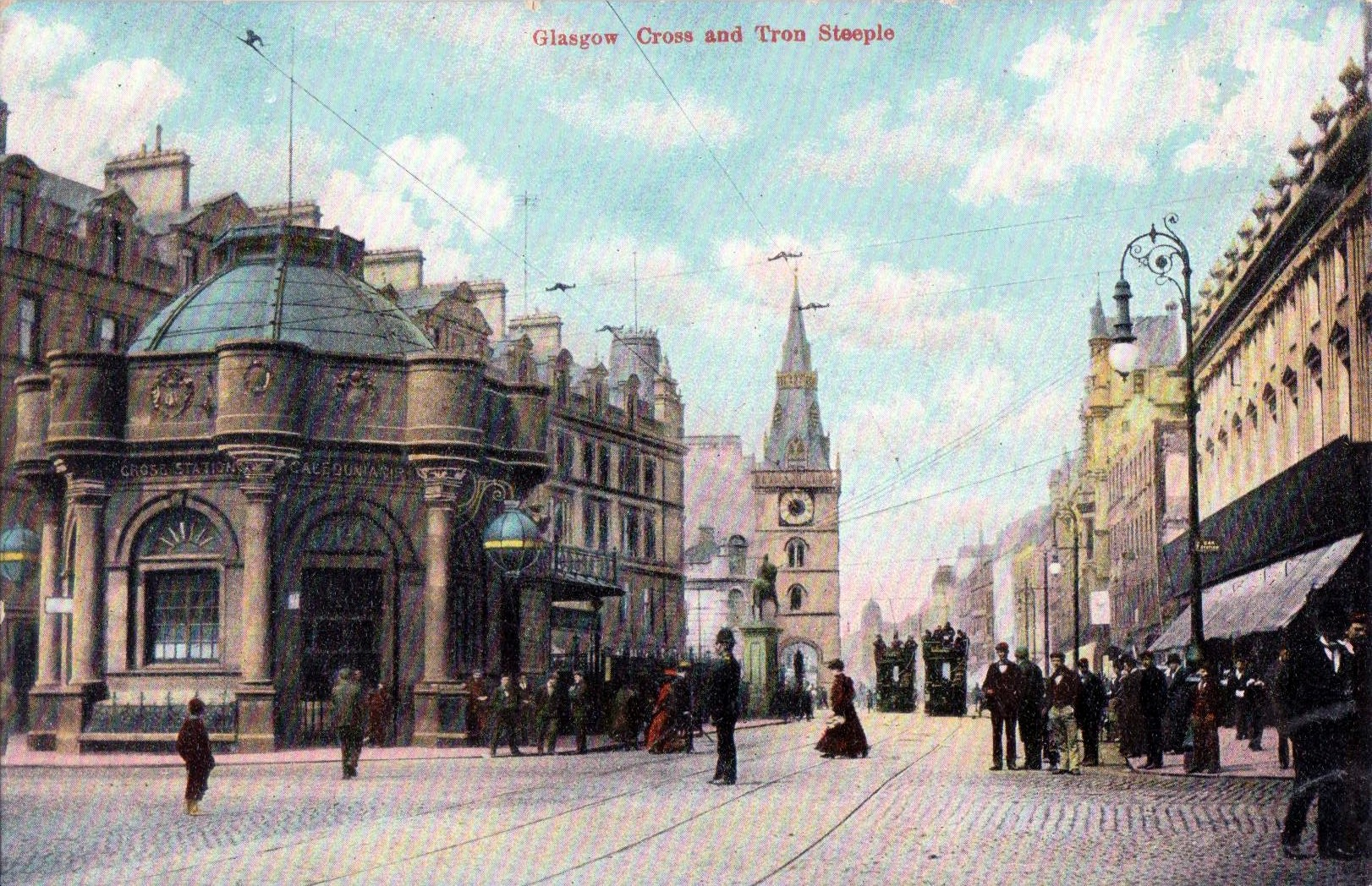
- Glasgow Cross railway station on the left.

General information
- Location: Glasgow, Glasgow; Scotland
- Coordinates: 55.8567°N 4.2442°W
- Platforms: 2

Other information
- Status: Disused

History
- Original company: Glasgow Central Railway
- Pre-grouping: Caledonian Railway
- Post-grouping: LMS

Key dates
- 1 November 1895: Opened
- 5 October 1964: Closed
Location

Glasgow Cross was a railway station in the city centre of Glasgow.

== History ==
This station was opened on 1 November 1895 by the Glasgow Central Railway.

It was closed, with the line through Glasgow Central (Low Level), on 5 October 1964.

== Argyle Line ==
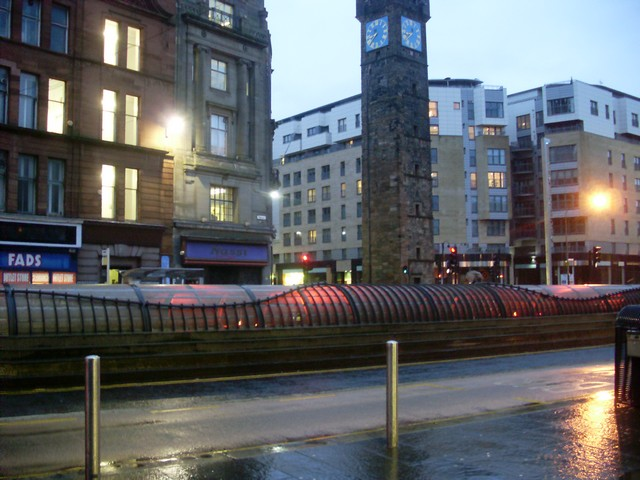
Site of the former station in 2008.

When the Argyle Line was opened in 1979, Glasgow Cross station was not reopened, being replaced by the new Argyle Street station to the west. Today it is now a ghost station and at surface level the only evidence of its existence are decorative ventilation grilles on the traffic island, between Trongate and London Road, whilst at track level there is a widening of the formation.

There have been proposals of the station being re-opened as an interchange as part of Crossrail Glasgow, which includes proposals for a new Glasgow Cross station located on the City Union bridge, tucked behind the Mercat Building.

Preceding station	Historical railways	Following station
Glasgow Green; Line open; station closed	Caledonian Railway; Glasgow Central Railway	Glasgow Central (Low Level)
