= Glasgow St Enoch rail accident =

Scottish rail accident

Coordinates: 55.85686°N 4.25218°W

Details
- Date: 27 July 1903
- Location: St Enoch railway station
- Country: Scotland
- Line: Glasgow and South Western Railway
- Cause: Driver's error Incomplete route knowledge

Statistics
- Trains: 1
- Deaths: 16
- Injured: 64

The Glasgow St Enoch rail accident occurred on 27 July 1903. A train arriving at the St Enoch terminal station failed to stop in time and collided heavily with the buffer stop, sustaining severe damage. Thirteen people were killed instantaneously and a further three died at a later time owing to injuries received. 64 people were injured, of which 17 required hospital treatment. This was the worst buffer stop collision on British main line railways, though exceeded by the Moorgate tragedy on the London Underground.

Collisions with buffer stops have frequently occurred over the years, the most recent fatal one in the UK being the London Cannon Street station rail crash in 1991. However, normally they occur at very low speed, less than 5 mph (8.0 km/h). The severity of the St Enoch accident was because the collision speed was as high as 15–20 mph (24–32 km/h). An inexperienced driver on a special train from Ardrossan was signalled into a platform that he did not realise was much shorter than the others, because it terminated short of the overall roof and well short of the main concourse. The station had been recently rebuilt and the newly added platform was on a sharp curve. The driver approached at too high a speed and braked too late. The solid masonry platform behind the buffer stops presented an immovable barrier and two coaches were completely telescoped.
