= Lugton railway station =

Former railway station in Scotland

Lugton

General information
- Location: Lugton, Ayrshire; Scotland
- Coordinates: 55.7435°N 4.5274°W
- Grid reference: NS414529
- Platforms: 2

Other information
- Status: Disused

History
- Original company: Glasgow, Barrhead and Kilmarnock Joint Railway
- Pre-grouping: Glasgow, Barrhead and Kilmarnock Joint Railway
- Post-grouping: London, Midland and Scottish Railway

Key dates
- 27 March 1871: Opened
- 7 November 1966: Closed to passengers
Location

Lugton railway station was a railway station serving the hamlet of Lugton, East Ayrshire, Scotland. The station was originally part of the Glasgow, Barrhead and Kilmarnock Joint Railway.

== History ==
The station opened on 27 March 1871, and closed permanently to passengers on 7 November 1966.

Today the line still open as part of the Glasgow South Western Line.

== Current operations ==
Today the line to Beith (now singled and heavily overgrown) is still in existence until just before the site of Barrmill railway station, where it then heads south along the original route of the Lanarkshire and Ayrshire Railway until it reaches DM Beith. DM Beith reportedly no longer require the rail connection and its removal at Lugton has allowed an extension of the proposed dynamic loop on the Glasgow South Western Line, which had been planned to run only between Dunlop and Stewarton stations. The loop allows half-hourly services to run between Glasgow and Kilmarnock.

The new 5 1/3-mile double-track loop portion was duly commissioned in September 2009, with the old Beith line disconnected as part of the work. The section is under the control of Lugton signal box and is designed for bi-directional operation.

| Preceding station | Historical railways | Following station |
|---|---|---|
| Barrmill; Line and station closed | Caledonian and Glasgow & South Western Railways; Glasgow, Barrhead and Kilmarnock Joint Railway | Caldwell; Line open; station closed |
| Dunlop | Caledonian and Glasgow & South Western Railways; Glasgow, Barrhead and Kilmarnock Joint Railway | Caldwell; Line open; station closed |
