= City Union Bridge =

Railway bridge in Glasgow, Scotland

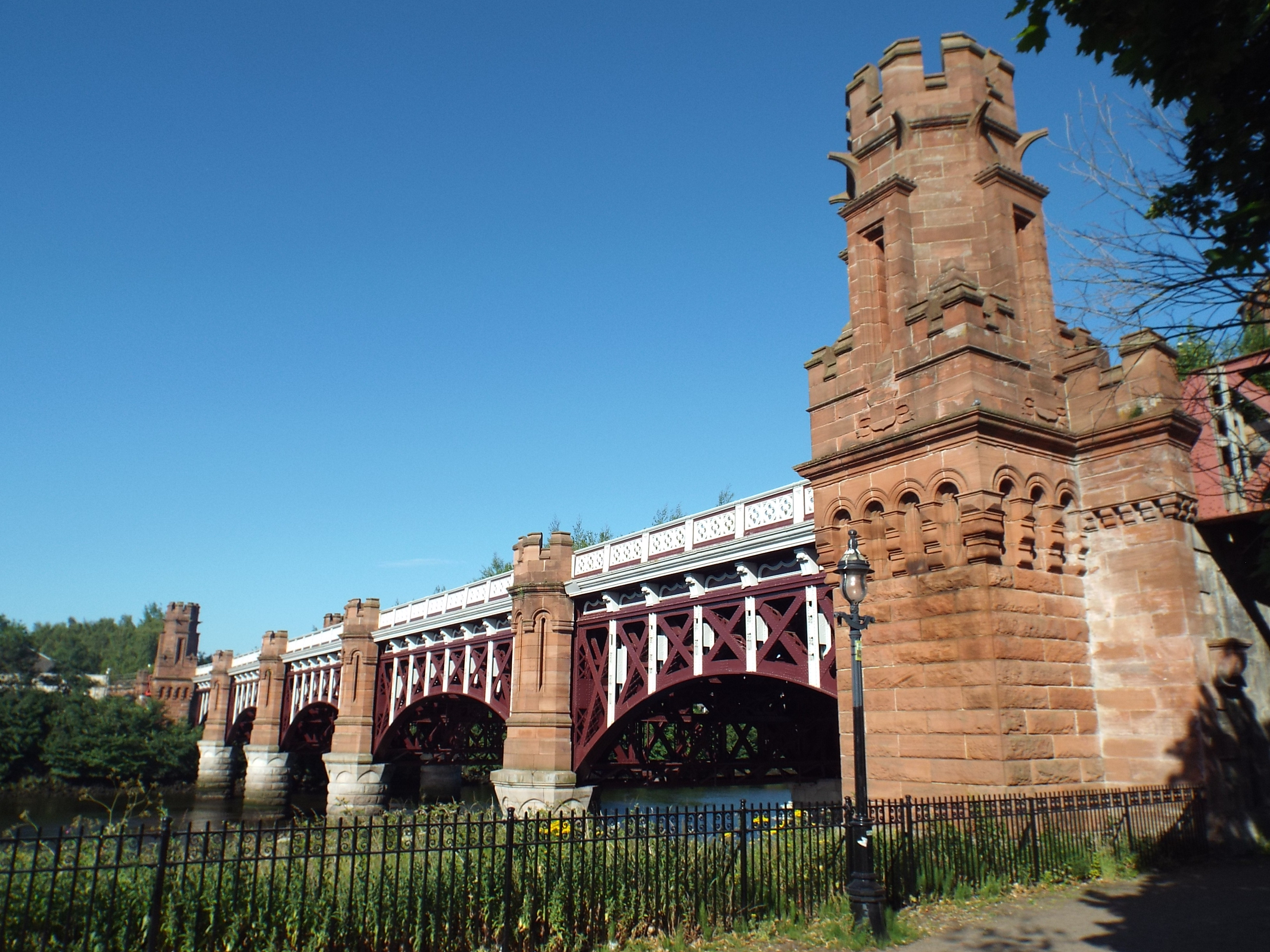
- Bridge across the River Clyde
- Coordinates: 55.8532°N 4.2493°W
- Crosses: River Clyde
- Locale: Glasgow

Location
- Interactive map of City Union Bridge

The City Union Bridge is a bridge on the River Clyde in Glasgow. It was opened in 1899. It was once a busy main route in and out of St Enoch station but that terminus closed in 1966 and was demolished in 1977, and since then the bridge is only used for empty stock movements, as the bridge forms a key link between Glasgow Queen Street and Glasgow Central. If a project known as Glasgow Crossrail goes ahead then the bridge and associated track will see passenger services once more.

The City of Glasgow Union Railway built the first railway bridge over the River Clyde in the City of Glasgow here, which opened in 1870. It consisted of twin-lattice parallel iron girders in seven spans; the engineers were John Fowler and J F Blair, and the contractor was Thomas Brassey & co. Deep foundations to the piers required—up to 100 feet (30 m)—and cylinder caissons were lowered to firm rock by the use of a grab type excavator working within; the excavated face was kept under water.

In 1898 the bridge was completely rebuilt, and widened for quadruple track; compressed air excavation for 13-foot (4 m) diameter steel piers were used. The structure consists of two variable depth continuous girders. The visible spandrel braced arches are not primary structural members. There is a decorative cast-iron cornice and parapet, and towers and half turrets in red sandstone. The work cost £67,970. The engineer was William Melville, this time for the Glasgow & South Western Railway Company, and the contractors were Morrison and Mason for the foundations, and Sir William Arrol & Co. for the steelwork. It is a listed building, category B.

== See also ==
- List of bridges in Scotland
