= St Enoch railway station =

Former Glasgow railway terminus

Glasgow St Enoch
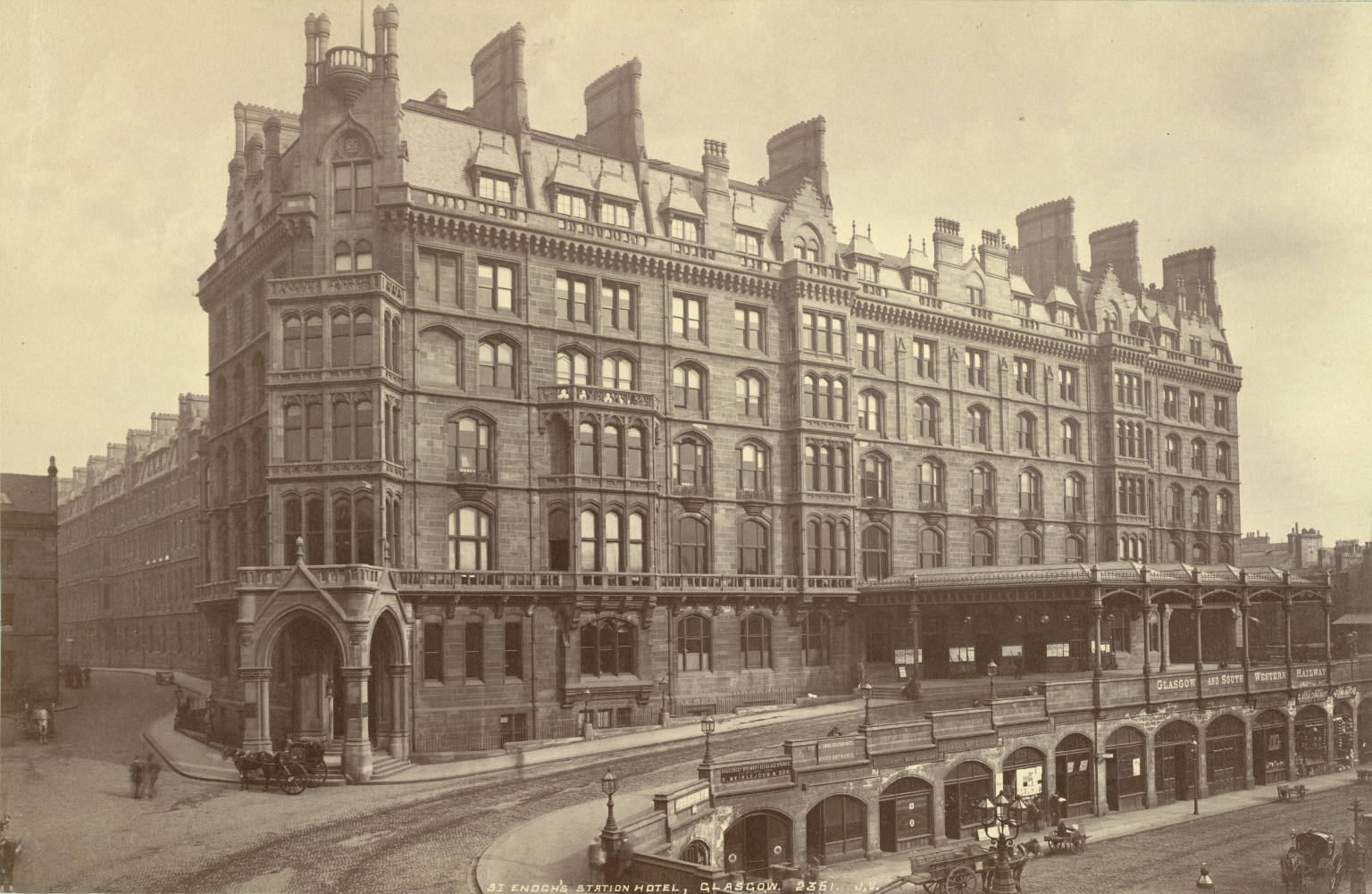
- St Enoch railway station and hotel in 1879. Photograph by James Valentine

General information
- Location: Glasgow, Scotland; United Kingdom
- Coordinates: 55.85730°N 4.25370°W
- Grid reference: NS589649
- Platforms: 12

Other information
- Status: Demolished, 1977

History
- Original company: City of Glasgow Union Railway
- Pre-grouping: Glasgow and South Western Railway
- Post-grouping: LMS

Key dates
- 12 December 1870: Dunlop Street station opened
- 17 October 1876: Dunlop Street station closed
- 17 October 1876: Opened
- 27 June 1966: Closed
Location

St Enoch station was a mainline railway station in the city of Glasgow, Scotland between 1876 and 1966. The hotel was the first building in Glasgow to be fitted out with electric lighting. The station was demolished in 1977.

== History ==
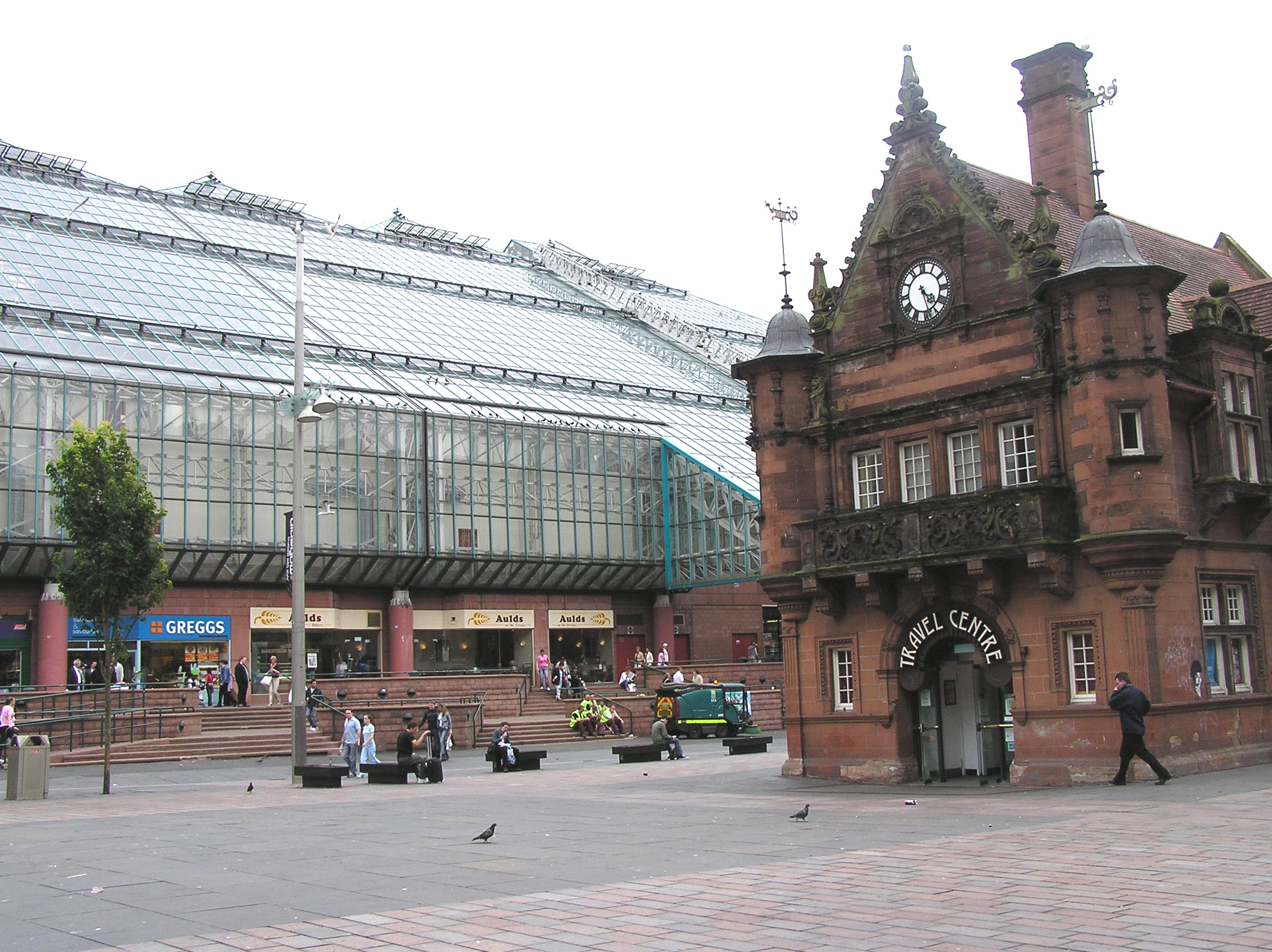
The glass St Enoch Centre on the site of the old St Enoch mainline station in 2005, with the former St Enoch Subway station (now converted into a café) on the right

Located on St Enoch Square in the city centre, it was opened by the City of Glasgow Union Railway in 1876. The first passenger train stopped there on 1 May 1876 and the official opening took place on 17 October 1876.

In 1883 it was taken over by the Glasgow and South Western Railway (G&SWR) and it became their headquarters. Services ran to most parts of the G&SWR system, including Ayr, Dumfries, Carlisle, Kilmarnock and Stranraer. In partnership with the Midland Railway, through services also ran to England, using the Settle and Carlisle Railway from Carlisle to Leeds, Sheffield, Derby and London St Pancras; the so-called Thames-Clyde route.

It was the site of a rail crash in 1903 in which 16 passengers were killed and 64 injured when a train overran the buffers. In the 1923 grouping it was taken over and then operated by the London Midland and Scottish Railway. After the nationalisation of the United Kingdom rail network, the station was run by British Railways.

The suburban service to East Kilbride was diverted to St Enoch in 1959, when all but three services were dieselised. The diversion was said to be necessary to reduce the numbers of trains at Glasgow Central.

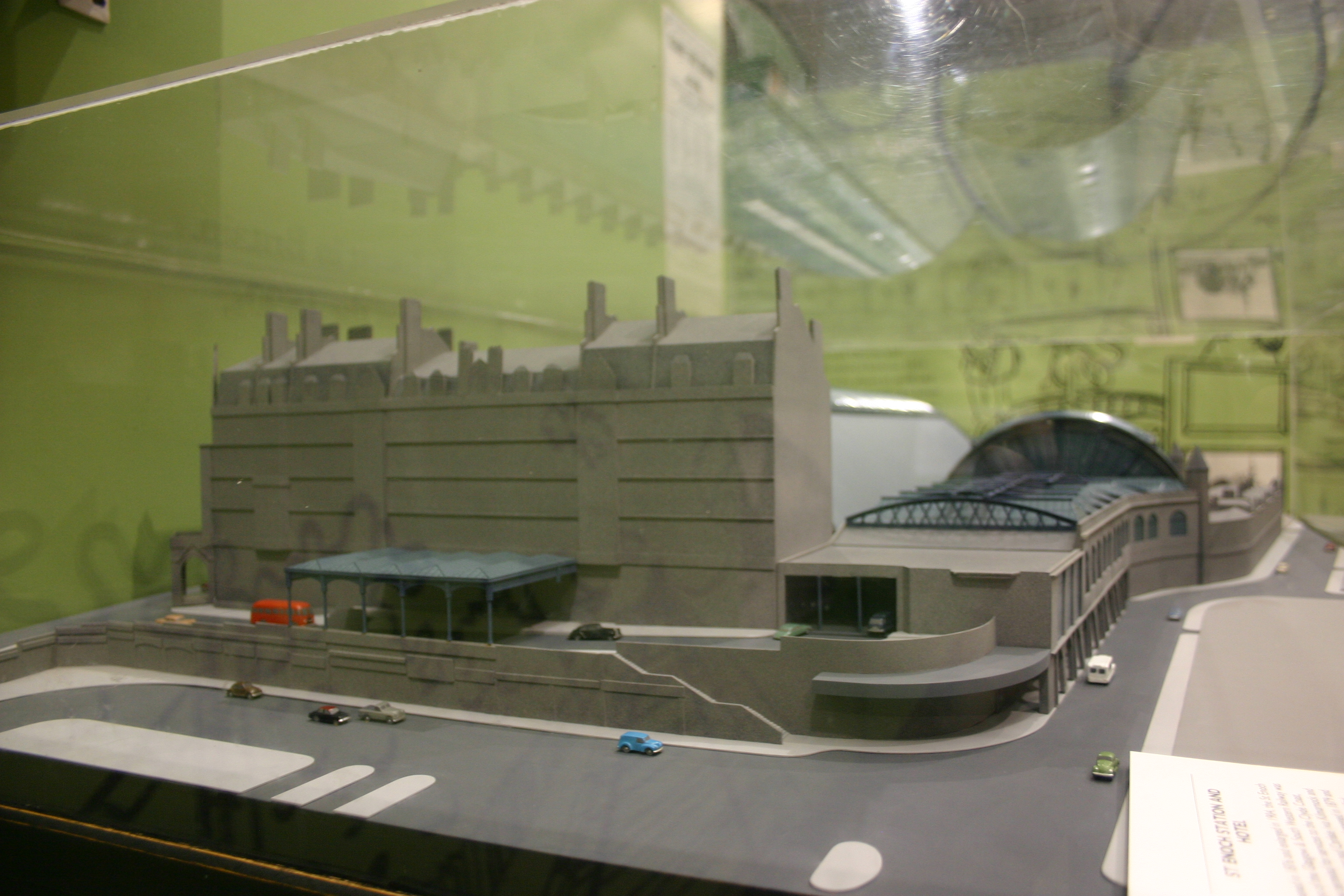
Model of the station at the former Glasgow Museum of Transport at the Kelvin Hall

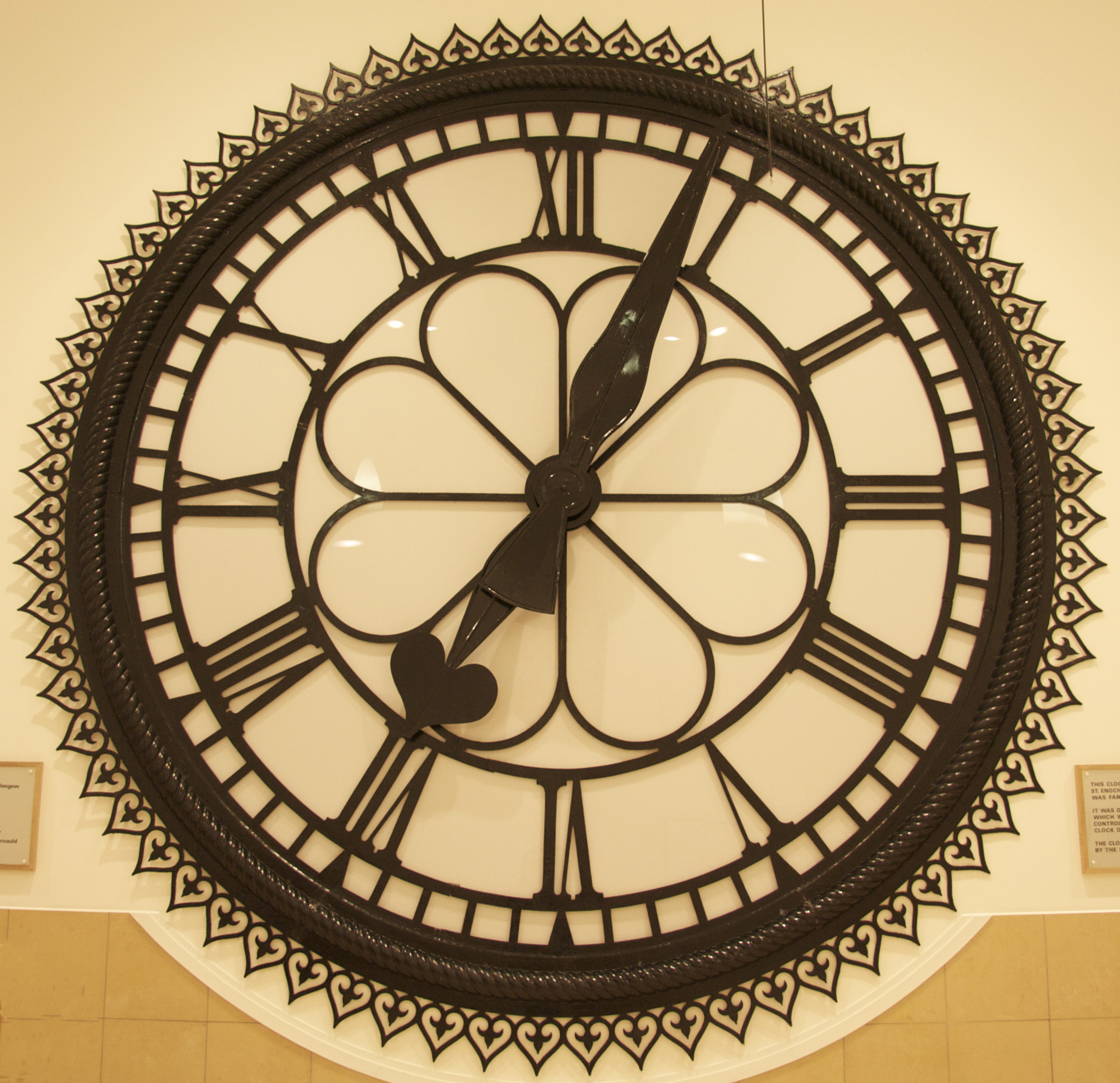
The former St Enoch Station Clock at the Antonine Centre in Cumbernauld.

It was a large station with 12 platforms and two impressive semi-cylindrical glass/iron roofed train sheds. The station was closed on 27 June 1966 as part of the rationalisation of the railway system undertaken by the British Railways Board chairman Dr. Richard Beeching; upon closure its 250 trains and 23,000 passengers a day were diverted to Central. The roofs of the structure were demolished, despite protests, in 1977. The clock that was suspended from the roof of the station was saved from destruction and is now on display in Cumbernauld Town Centre.

The St Enoch Hotel which fronted the station was also demolished in 1977.

== Current site ==
The site of the station is now occupied by another glass structure, the St Enoch Centre, a large shopping centre. The remains of the station and hotel were used to help fill in the Queen's Dock, today the home of the SEC Centre, the SEC Armadillo and the OVO Hydro.

Though the mainline station is gone, parts of the arcaded approach embankments (now containing shops and restaurants) can be seen to the east of the shopping centre's car park on Osborne Street. Although the short remaining section which once led into the station now goes nowhere, the southern section remains as a freight line along the route of the Glasgow City Union Railway, crossing the Clydebridge Viaduct of 1899 which spans the River Clyde.

The red sandstone ticket hall which stands in St Enoch Square immediately west of the shopping centre is not part of the former rail station, but is the former ticket hall for the adjacent St Enoch subway station on the Glasgow Subway.

== Dunlop Street railway station ==
St Enoch station replaced another nearby station, Glasgow Dunlop Street, which was opened by the City of Glasgow Union Railway on 12 December 1870. It was closed by the Glasgow and South Western Railway the same day St Enoch opened.

== Services ==
Preceding station	Historical railways	Following station
Terminus	North British Railway; City of Glasgow Union Railway	Gallowgate
Terminus	Glasgow and South Western Railway; Glasgow, Barrhead and Neilston Direct Railway	Gorbals
Terminus	Glasgow and South Western Railway; City of Glasgow Union Railway	Main Street
