= Glasgow Green railway station =

Former railway station in Scotland

Coordinates: 55°51′4″N 4°14′2″W

Glasgow Green
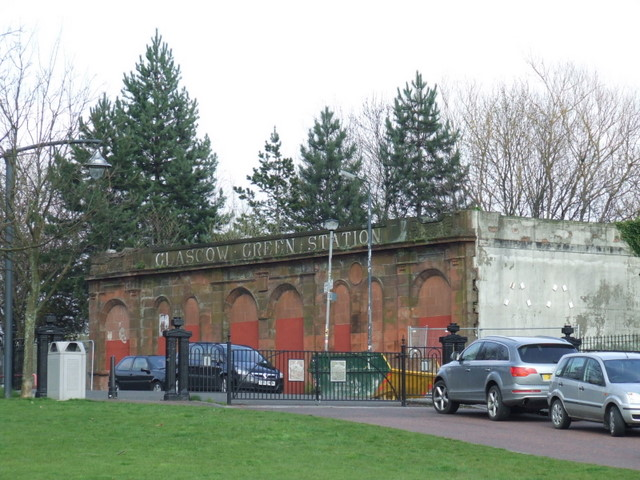
- Glasgow Green station in 2008

General information
- Location: Glasgow Green, Glasgow; Scotland
- Platforms: 2

Other information
- Status: Disused

History
- Original company: Glasgow Central Railway
- Pre-grouping: Caledonian Railway
- Post-grouping: LMS

Key dates
- 1 November 1895: Opened
- 1 January 1917: Closed as a Wartime economy measure
- 1 June 1919: Reopened
- 2 November 1953: Closed
Location

Glasgow Green was a railway station in the east end of Glasgow, Scotland.

The station was opened on 1 November 1895 and closed on 1 January 1917. It reopened on 1 June 1919 and closed again on 2 November 1953. The station then sat unused on the Argyle Line of the Glasgow suburban railway network, with no plans to reopen and its platforms removed. The lettering of the station name was in the same style of other Caledonian Stations, most notably on the main canopy of Glasgow Central.

On 20 March 2012, what remained of the station's façade (the southern and western walls, their windows and doorways bricked up) was demolished. Network Rail cited public safety as the reason, claiming the façade had become unsafe after sustaining storm damage.

Preceding station	Historical railways	Following station
Bridgeton	Caledonian Railway; Glasgow Central Railway	Glasgow Cross; Line open; station closed
