= Gallowgate railway station =

Disused railway station in Glasgow, Scotland

Coordinates: 55.8564°N 4.2416°W

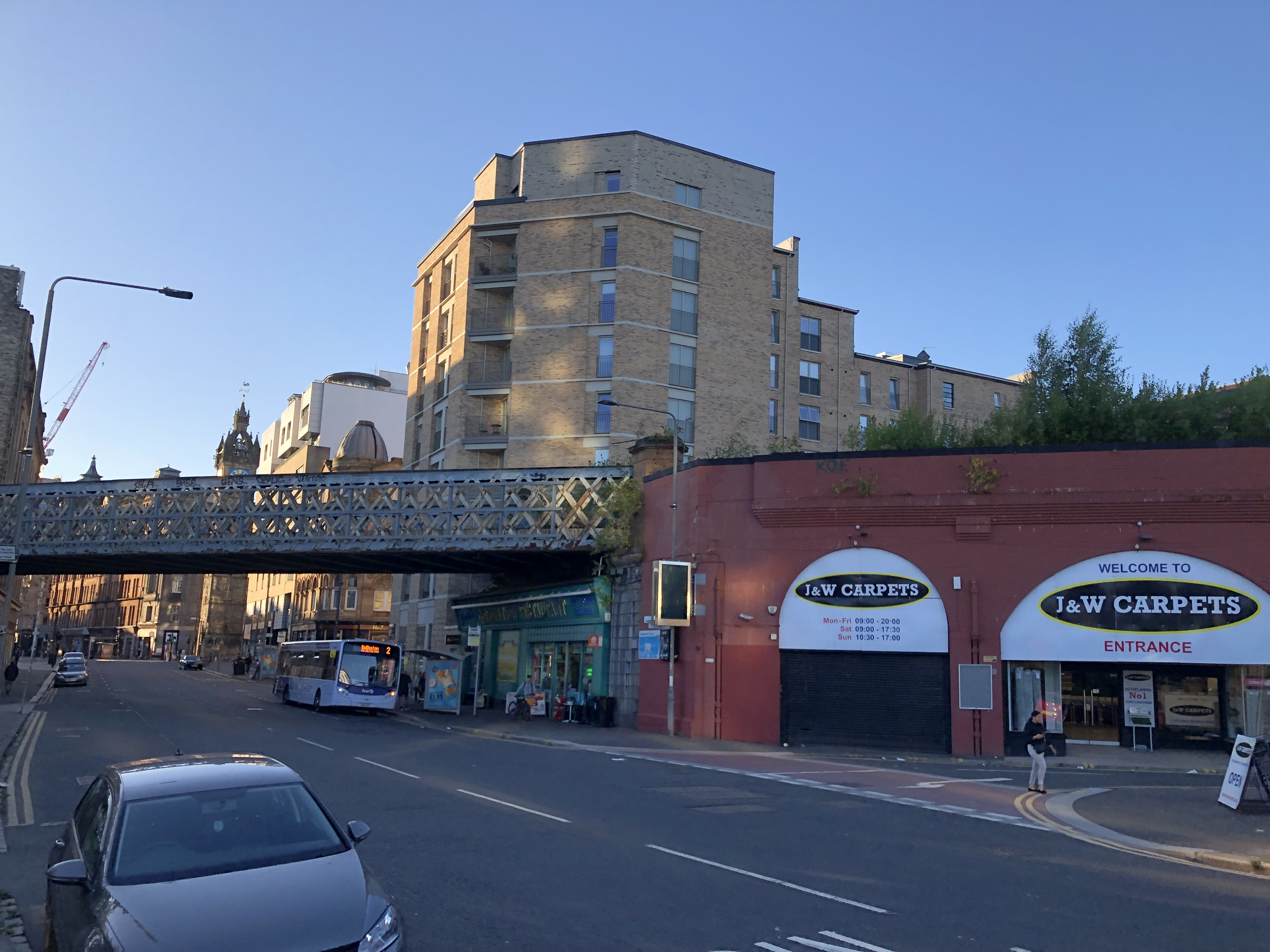
Current (2023) image of the station's location. The entrance was on the right

Gallowgate railway station was a station on the City Union Line in Glasgow, Scotland. It was situated a short distance east of Glasgow Cross at the junction of Gallowgate and East Nile Street, today Molendinar Street.

The station opened on 18 December 1870, then closed and shortly reopened in 1871. It closed permanently on 1 October 1902.

Workmen’s service operated until 1926 or 1934. The bridge which carried the tracks to the station remains standing, as the line is still used by empty stock passengers trains to and from Shields Depot south of the River Clyde and occasional freight trains.
