= City Union Line =

Scottish railway company

City of Glasgow Union Railway
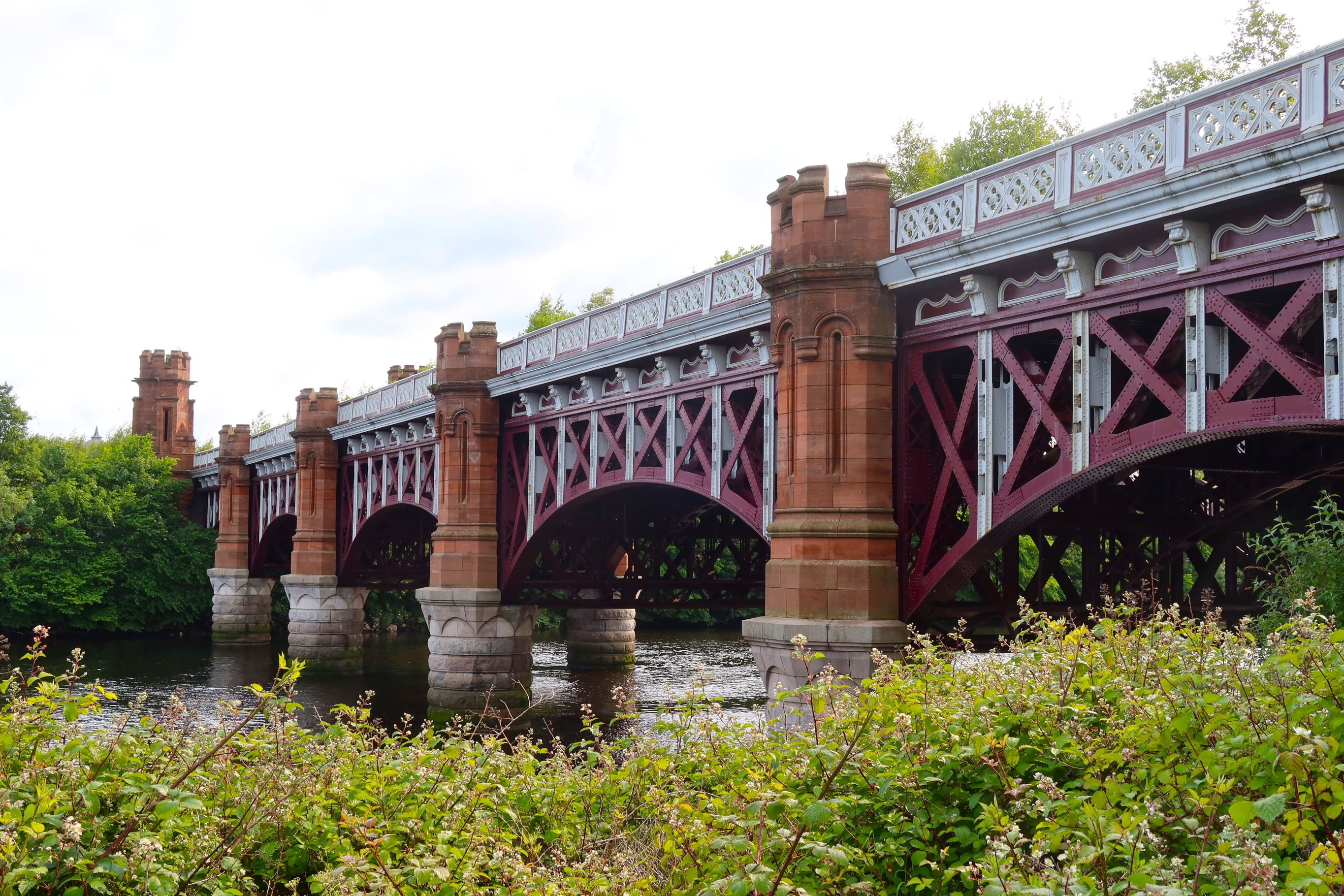
- The bridge over the River Clyde

Overview
- Locale: Scotland
- Dates of operation: 12 December 1870–31 December 1922
- Successor: LMS & LNER

Technical
- Track gauge: 4 ft 8 1/2 in (1,435 mm)

The City of Glasgow Union Railway – City Union Line, also known as the Tron Line, was a railway company founded in Glasgow, Scotland, in 1864 to build a line connecting the railway systems north and south of the River Clyde, and to build a central passenger terminus and a general goods depot for the city. The through line, running from south-west to north-east across the city, opened in 1870–71, and the passenger terminal was St Enoch railway station, opened in 1876. The railway bridge across the Clyde was the first in the city.

The northern section of the line passed to the North British Railway company (NBR) and became part of its suburban network. St Enoch became the passenger terminus for the Glasgow and South Western Railway, but other companies made little use of it. However, the general goods terminal at College became important, and goods and mineral traffic were the dominant traffic of the through route. The south-western section of the line was quadrupled, and the platform accommodation was doubled, in the last years of the nineteenth century.

In the 1960s, rationalisation of railway facilities was the theme, and all the south-facing passenger services were concentrated at Glasgow Central station. St Enoch closed on 27 June 1966 and most of the site is now occupied by the St Enoch Centre shopping mall. College goods also succumbed and was closed.

The through route remained open for occasional freight services and for empty passenger stock movements across the city. The Bellgrove section that passed to the NBR remains in intensive passenger use, but the elevated section across the city is the iconic part of the line, with large span lattice bridges over Saltmarket, London Road and Gallowgate, which is currently only used for non-passenger movements of trains.

A railway development scheme being considered may lead to renewed use of the line as a cross-city passenger link.

== History ==
=== Plans ===
The Glasgow, Paisley, Kilmarnock and Ayr Railway (GPK&AR) and its rival, the Glasgow, Paisley and Greenock Railway, received their authorising acts of Parliament on 15 July 1837. Although they hoped for separate lines, they were obliged to build their line as far as Paisley jointly; their lines diverged west of that point. Their Glasgow terminus was Bridge Street, on the south bank of the River Clyde. At first this was adequate but as traffic developed the arrangement became unsatisfactory. The GPK&AR absorbed another railway and was renamed the Glasgow and South Western Railway (G&SWR), and was running trains to a range of destinations in its area of influence.

Suggestions had been made for some years to connect the lines south and north of the Clyde: in 1846 a parliamentary select committee produced a report of 1,470 pages on the subject, but in the face of opposition from vested interests including those who received the tolls on the existing road bridges, nothing was done.

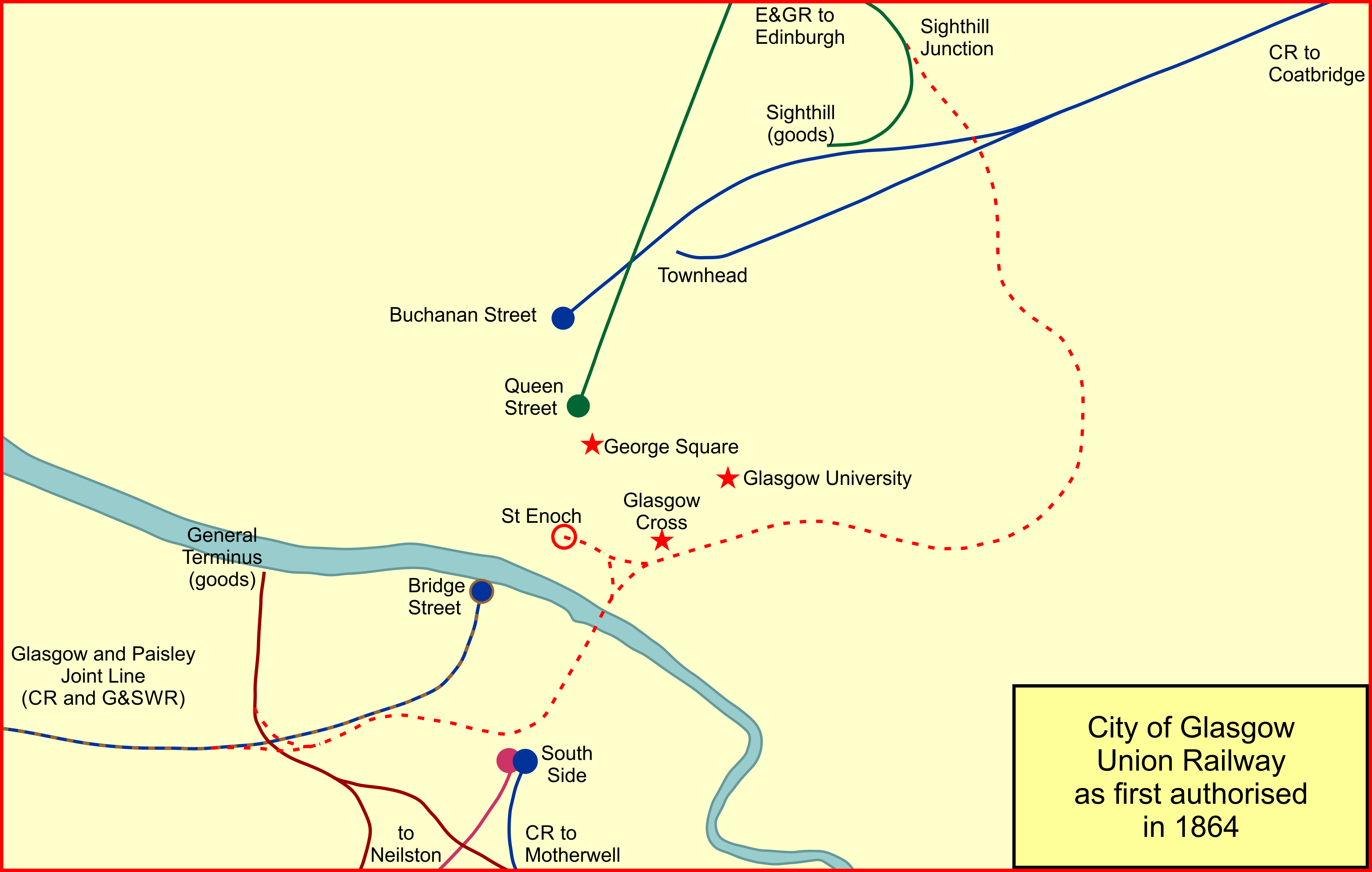
Proposed route of the City of Glasgow Union Railway in 1864

Other unsuccessful proposals followed, but in 1863 a prospectus for a City of Glasgow Union Railway was published: it would "unite the whole of the Railways now terminating North and South of the River Clyde", and provide a "general Central Station" (at St Enoch Square) for passengers and a separate "General Goods Station" on lands to be vacated by the University of Glasgow: "College Goods station". The promoters were contractors, hoping to generate construction work for themselves, and they wished to involve all the railways in the scheme, taking a substantial block of shares themselves. (Note: In The Glasgow and South Western Railway Ross indicates that the contractors were the prime movers in the scheme, but Paterson, pages 212-213, suggests that it was a G&SWR and E&GR initiative. In The Caledonian, Ross says on page 84 that "The initiative came from the Glasgow and South Western side," but also on the same page that it was "a contractor's ramp".) The G&SWR and the Edinburgh and Glasgow Railway (E&GR) were favourable towards such a scheme as the trade in goods between their areas of influence was considerable, and the available through route was circuitous. The other major player was the Caledonian Railway (CR) which had terminals north and south of the Clyde; it was developing its Buchanan Street station and it had adequate goods facilities, but it was not opposed to the idea of a link and a common passenger terminal.

The line would be over 6 miles (9.7 km) long, from West Street to Sighthill, where the E&GR had a goods yard; it would cost £650,000 to build. (Note: The western extremity was later altered to Shields Junction, a short distance west of West Street. The alignment east of Glasgow High Street was altered to join the NBR Coatbridge - College line at College West Junction and leave it again at Bellgrove East Junction.) The original "St Enoch's Square Central Station" was designed by John Fowler and J. F. Blair. It was a through station: a general plan (Note: Taken from a plan in Engineering, 18 January 1867, reproduced in Johnstone and Hume, page 65. The original periodical "Engineering" is difficult to trace.) shows an eight platform station on the site actually used; there are three short bay platforms, a "Northern Division" of two platform faces, and a southern division with four tracks extending westwards across Dixon Street. There is no indication where the tracks are destined; in earlier years there had been considerable interest in providing rail access to the Broomielaw quays on the north bank of the Clyde, and this may be the purpose. In 1869-1870 when the Queen's Dock was being planned at Stobcross, the G&SWR applied for running powers there, intending to build a line west from Dunlop Street, bridging St Enoch Square and running parallel and close to the north bank of the Clyde. The scheme would have been enormously disruptive and expensive, and the application was refused.

City of Glasgow Union Railway Act 1864
- Act of Parliament
- Parliament of the United Kingdom
- Long title: An Act for making and maintaining the City of Glasgow Union Railway; and for other Purposes.
- Citation: 27 & 28 Vict. c. cclxxxvi

Dates
- Royal assent: 29 July 1864

Text of statute as originally enacted

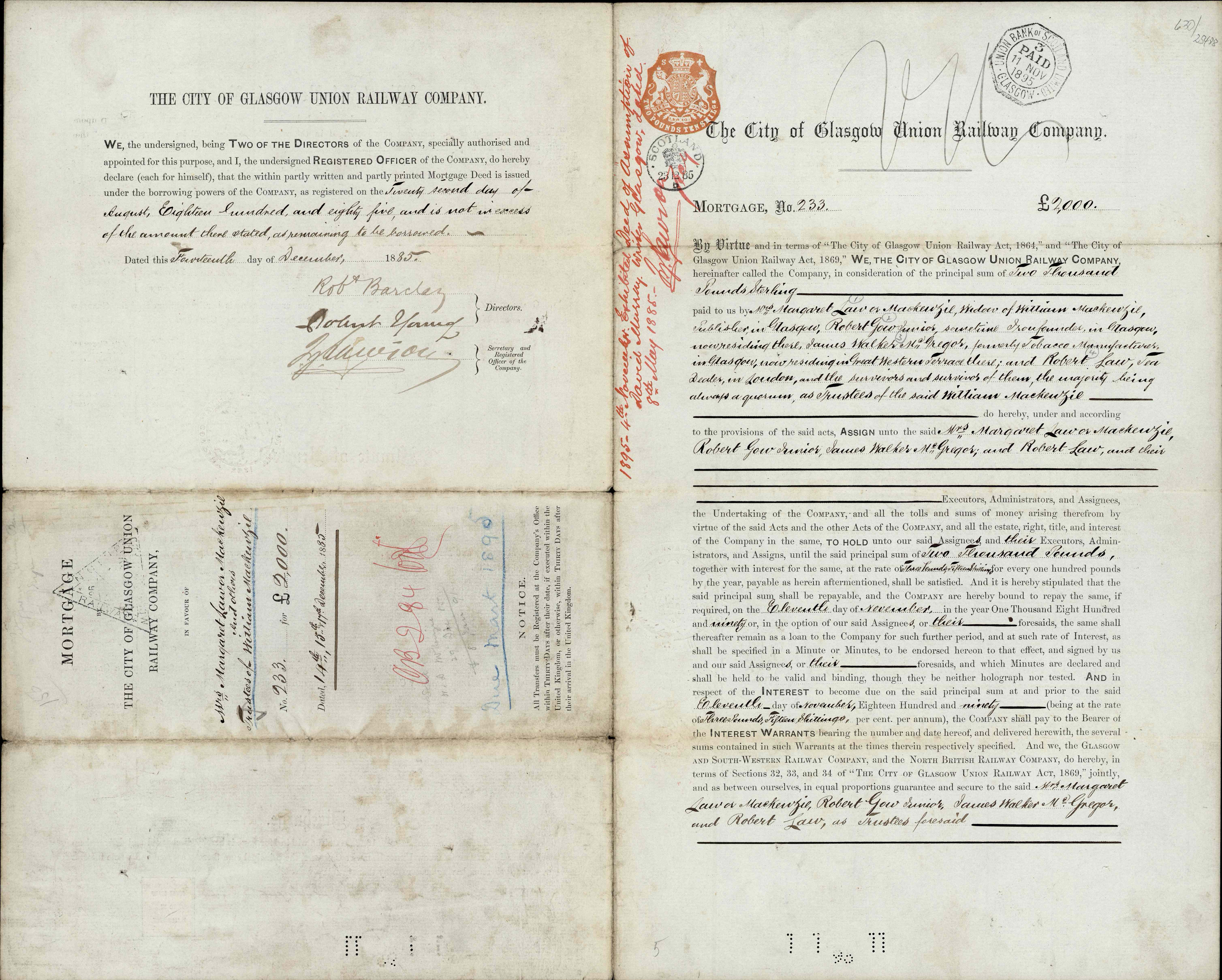
Mortgage by the City of Glasgow Union Railway in 1885

The capital requirement soon escalated to £900,000, and the G&SWR and the E&GR were supportive, but the CR was not greatly interested (and may have taken offence at the manner of the approach) and opposed the scheme. Nonetheless, the City of Glasgow Union Railway Act 1864 (27 & 28 Vict. c. cclxxxvi) received royal assent on 29 July 1864. In early 1865 it was agreed that the G&SWR and the E&GR would between them take the whole of the stock of the new company, releasing the prospective contractors from that obligation. On 1 August 1865 the E&GR was taken over by the larger, but more remote, North British Railway (NBR).

The scheme for the general passenger station was now modified, as it emerged that the NBR did not contemplate making much use of it, although hopes lingered that the Caledonian would have a change of heart and join in the project. For the time being a smaller station at Dunlop Street was considered to suffice. The NBR was experiencing financial difficulties. Access for mineral traffic to the General Terminus goods station on the south bank of the Clyde was a significant consideration in supporting the CGUR, but the huge expenditure on a grand terminal passenger station was too much for the NBR board.

=== Opening ===
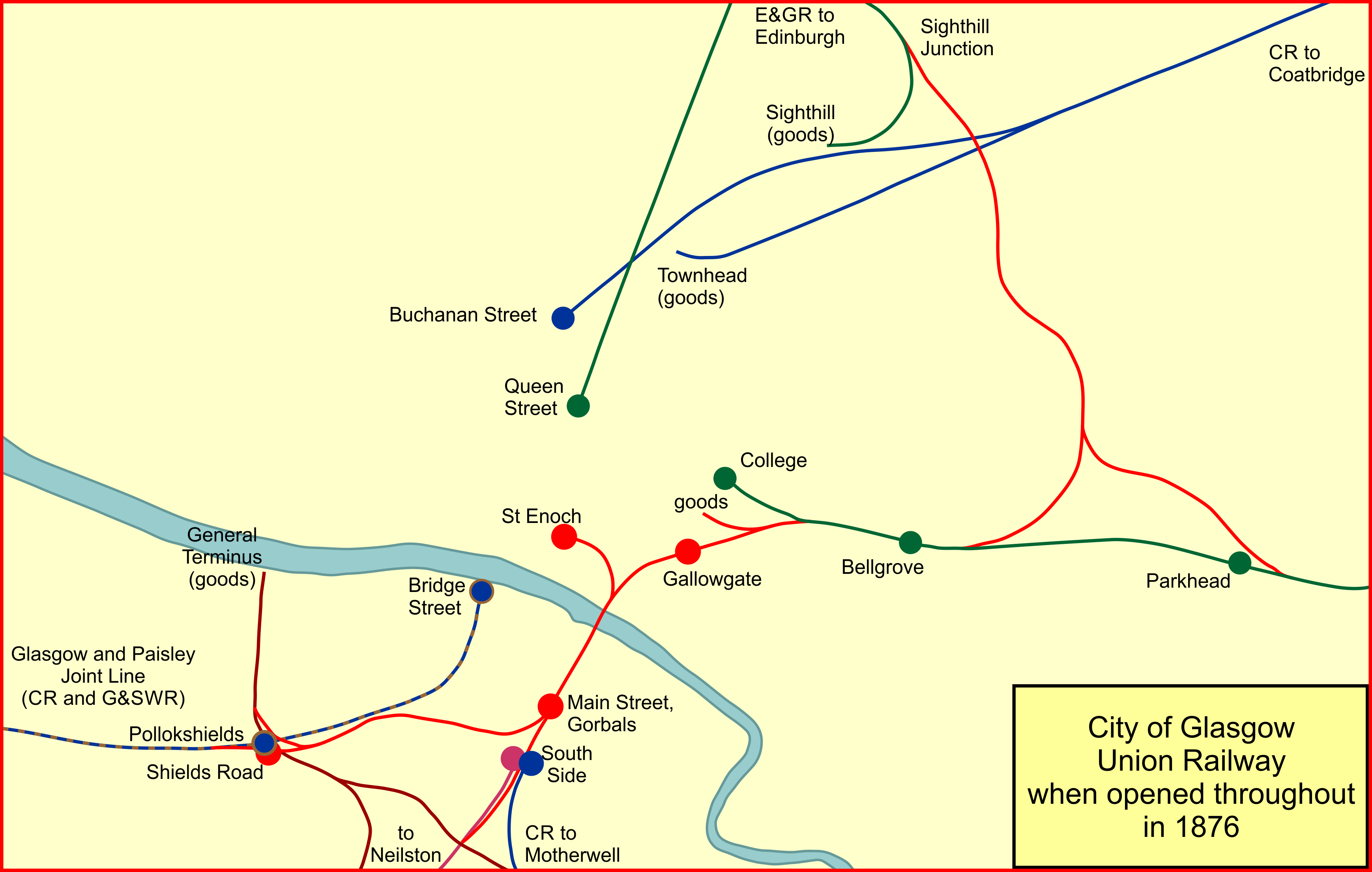
System map of the City of Glasgow Union Railway in 1876

Work progressed and in September 1870 the City of Glasgow Union line opened to goods traffic only. It opened for full passenger use between Shields Road and Dunlop Street on 12 December 1870; St Enoch station was not ready and the Dunlop Street station was a temporary terminus. (Note: The Dunlop Street station was on the curve towards the (later) St Enoch station, and off the route of the through line towards Sighthill. The street was later submerged under railway construction. Ross states (page 84) that "Despite its temporary character, the station [was] large and commodious, with six platforms [and] a twin-span iron roof 504 feet long and 80 feet high." The station was elevated on a viaduct, at a location intended at the time to be simply a double track section leading to St Enoch station. If this report is correct, it must have involved considerable "temporary" land acquisition and construction to support a six-platform terminal station, handling only a shuttle passenger service to Shields Road. The dimensions of the roof are identical to those he quotes on page 99 for the permanent St Enoch station.) The Dunlop Street station had cost £200,000.

At Shields Road there was a station on the Union line and also on the Glasgow and Paisley Joint line, where passengers could change for Paisley, Ayr and Greenock.

The construction had cost about £1 million, due chiefly to escalating land acquisition costs. The new line incorporated the first railway bridge over the Clyde in the city; but the St Enoch Square terminus had not been started yet.

On 1 June 1871 the service was extended to Bellgrove, with an intermediate station at Gallowgate. Trains towards Bellgrove worked into Dunlop Street terminus, and then were propelled back to Clyde Junction to resume their onward journey. At this time the NBR was extending westwards from Coatbridge via Shettleston and opened the line to College passenger station on 1 February 1871. This brought extra flows of Monklands coal to the CGUR, destined for the Clyde at General Terminus. By October 1872 the College Goods station was in operation, though with costs escalating, it was long before it was completed.

The line through to Sighthill Junction was opened to goods traffic on 18 August 1875, although it was not until 1 January 1881 that passenger services reached Alexandra Parade, and 1 January 1887 to Springburn, beyond Sighthill Junction.

Over 1,300 houses had been demolished in the construction, and by 1874 £2,200,000 had been expended.

=== St Enoch station opened at last ===
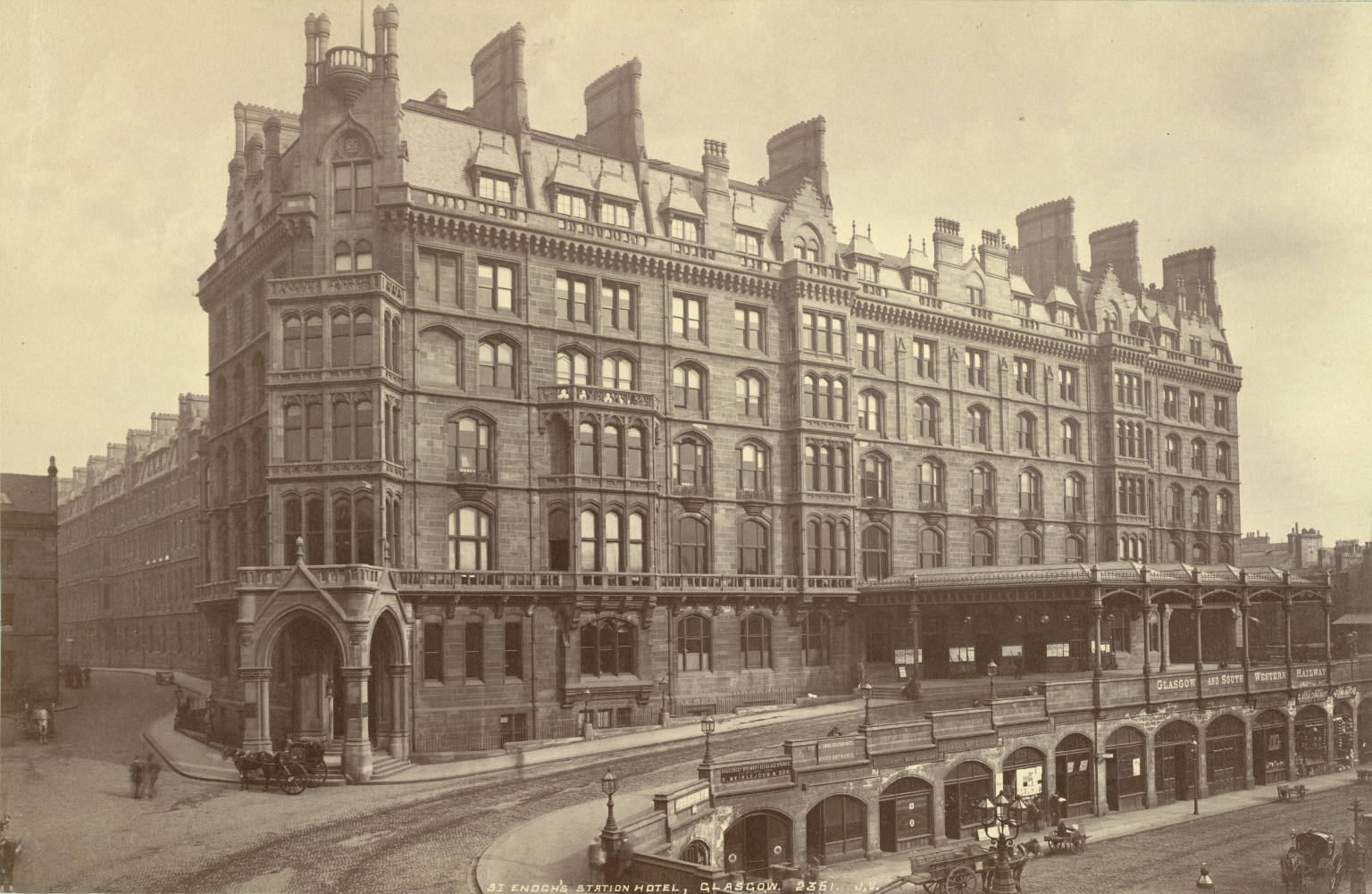
St Enoch railway station in 1879

Negotiations between the G&SWR and the English Midland Railway for mutual co-operation or merger had blown hot and cold. Finally on 1 May 1876 the first through trains ran from St Enoch to St Pancras station, London, over the two lines. Four trains ran daily, with Pullman drawing room cars, and sleeping cars on a night service. In fact the station was far from complete: it was not until the end of 1877 that the station was ready, with the southwards connection opening on 1 November.

There were six platforms beneath the arch iron and glass roof, which was 504 feet (154 m) in length, 80 feet (24 m) high and with a clear span of 198 feet (60 m). The cost had risen to £1,275,000. There were 43 trains each way, six days a week. Through coaches from Edinburgh to Ayr were operated in association with the North British Railway; they were detached from trains to Queen Street at Bellgrove, and worked forward to Clyde Junction, where they were attached to trains starting from St Enoch.

The station was the first public area in Scotland to be lit by electricity, although 464 gas jet lamps were provided as an emergency standby. Nonetheless, Johnston calls it "by far the gloomiest of the Glasgow quartet [of main line terminals]".

As late as July 1876 the Caledonian Railway renewed an approach concerning use of St Enoch by their trains; they were rebuffed by the G&SWR, who said that a minimum payment of £500,000 would be necessary to permit the access.

On 3 July 1879 the St Enoch station hotel opened: it was the largest in Scotland.

St Enoch station had been built under a separate financial account; on 29 June 1883 that charge was incorporated into the G&SWR general account; it had cost £1,672,474. The station and the immediate approach lines were transferred to the G&SWR from that date.

From July 1883 there were through services from Greenock, Ayr and Ardrossan to Edinburgh; complicated movements were necessary at St Enoch to achieve a through service.

=== Quadrupling, and division ===
In 1894, discussions took place about capacity on the Union Line. The North British Railway had opened its Bridgeton terminus, on a branch from High Street, and a short spur was proposed to enable eastbound trains on the Union Line to run to Bridgeton.

Quadrupling of the section of the Union Line between Clyde Junction and Port Eglinton Junction was proposed, responding to the increasing density of traffic: the line was said to be carrying 9 million passengers a year, and a million tons of goods and minerals. The section east of College West Junction fell logically to the North British, and it was proposed to divide the company, the NBR taking 40% of the share capital. The G&SWR was to take over the whole of the railway south and west of the junction.

City of Glasgow Union Railway Partition Act 1896
- Act of Parliament
- Parliament of the United Kingdom
- Long title: An Act to provide for the partition between the Glasgow and South Western Railway Company and the North British Railway Company of the undertaking of the City of Glasgow Union Railway Company and for other purposes.
- Citation: 59 & 60 Vict. c. clxxxv

Dates
- Royal assent: 7 August 1896

Text of statute as originally enacted

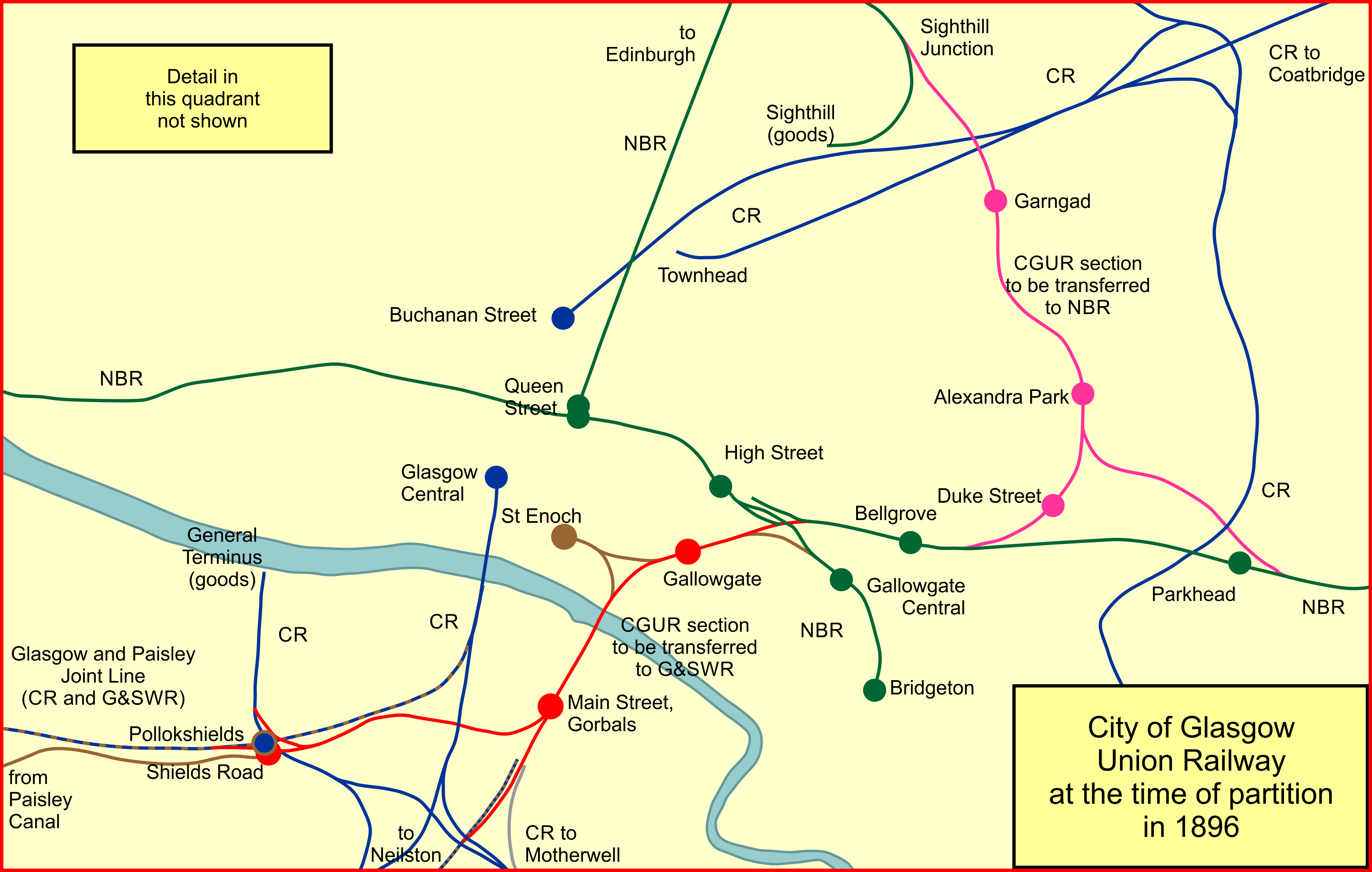
Partitioning of the City of Glasgow Union Railway system in 1896

The City of Glasgow Union Railway Partition Act 1896 (59 & 60 Vict. c. clxxxv) authorising this split was passed on 7 August 1896, in the face of opposition from the City Council of Glasgow, who calculated that it would lose rates income from the split.

On 18 August 1898 the Glasgow and South Western Railway Act 1898 (61 & 62 Vict. c. clix) giving powers for the extension of St Enoch station was passed. This involved a second arch roof and six further platforms; they were brought into use progressively from 1901. The station was completed in 1904, at a cost of £2,500,000.

=== Subsequent history ===
With the separation of the north-eastern section, the part of the original Union Railway north-east of St Enoch became simply a part of the North British Railway system.

In the 1960s, consideration was being given to rationalisation of railway facilities in the city: at the time there were four major termini. It was decided to concentrate the services of the former G&SWR and the Caledonian Railway on Glasgow Central station, and St Enoch station was closed to passengers on 27 June 1966. Parcels trains continued to use the station until 5 June 1967. For some time the extensive site in the city centre lay almost abandoned to pigeons and car parking, but a commercial shopping development was built on the site: the St Enoch Centre. College Goods station closed with the decline of wagonload freight.

The through route from Shields Junction to Bellgrove remained in use for a light freight service, and to transfer empty coaching stock across the city. The large span lattice girder bridges over Saltmarket, London Road and Gallowgate, and the elevated viaduct sections there and near Cumberland Street are reminders of an ambitious scheme to connect the north and south railway networks in the city.

That connection may once again be resumed: a development scheme is being planned that may lead to use of the line as a cross-city passenger link.

== Description of the route ==
=== Main section south ===
The main section of the CGUR is still in existence; it runs from Shields Junction on the Paisley to Glasgow line, and runs to College East Junction (later High Street Junction) between High Street and Bellgrove on the former NBR Coatbridge line. From Shields Jn the line climbs on viaduct and swings north to cross the Clyde by the Union Railway Bridge, then crossing Bridgegate, London Road and Gallowgate by long-span lattice bridges.

This section remains open for freight and empty coaching stock movements.

In 1885 the Paisley Canal Line was opened, and the G&SWR built a westward extension of the CGUR to enable its own trains to run from the Canal Line to St Enoch without using the Glasgow and Paisley Joint Line. At this period the configuration at Shields Road was exceedingly complex. The thoroughfare ran north to south on a bridge; there were three surface routes, each having a passenger station. From north to south

- the Joint Line; the station was Pollokshields;
- the CGUR, (which has diverged, for eastbound trains, from the Joint Line at Pollok Junction); the station was Shields Road; and
- the G&SWR Canal Line (which will join the CGUR at Eglinton Street Junction); the station was Shields.

The separate station designations persisted until 1925.

In addition there were three lower level lines, crossing north-west to south-east under the surface lines at the road bridge. These were

- a single line from Scotland Street Junction (i.e. General Terminus goods) to the CGUR;
- double track Caledonian Railway line from Scotland Street Junction to Larkhall Junction (towards Rutherglen);
- a converging double junction, of routes from Scotland Street and from Kinning Park goods station, leading to General Terminus Junction, whence onward to Larkhall Junction or Strathbungo Junction (for the Barrhead line);
- A double track from Maxwell Junction to General Terminus Junction, enabling through running from Paisley to either Rutherglen or Barrhead.

In 1893 the G&SWR opened a spur line from St Johns Junction, a short distance north of Gallowgate station, to Gallowgate Central Junction on the NBR Bridgeton line. This enabled a through service to be run from Greenock (Princes Pier) to Bridgeton via St Enoch.

=== St Enoch section ===
The St Enoch section formed a triangle of lines west of the main section, with Clyde Junction at the southern apex and Saltmarket Junction at the north-eastern apex. It was almost all on viaduct.

This section is closed.

=== Main section north ===
After a short section in which CGUR trains used the NBR line, the CGUR reappears, swinging northwards at the east end of Bellgrove and climbing in retaining-wall cutting to Alexandra Parade and then in more open country crossing the original Garnkirk and Glasgow Railway line to Barnhill and Sighthill Junction. Springburn station lies just beyond Sighthill Junction, but the CGUR never built that far; G&SWR trains however operated a service from St Enoch station to Springburn.

This section remains open for passenger services between Queen Street Low Level and Springburn.

=== Langside Junction section ===
The short Langside Junction section struck southwards from Gorbals Junction past the site of the former South Side station to Langside Junction, giving G&SWR trains access to the Glasgow Barrhead and Kilmarnock Joint Line.

This section is closed.

=== Parkhead Branch ===
Enabling eastbound running from Cowlairs towards Shettleston, this branch ran from Haghill Junction (near Alexandra Parade) to Parkhead Junction.

This section is closed.

=== Stations and locations ===
Locations in italics are not passenger stations.

Main section south

- Shields Junction;
- Shields Road; combined with adjacent stations on 1 April 1925; closed 14 February 1966;
- Eglinton Street; opened 1 October 1900; renamed Cumberland Street 2 June 1924; closed 14 February 1966;
- Eglinton Street Junction;
- Main Street, Gorbals; opened 19 December 1870; closed 30 September 1900;
- Clyde Junction;
- Saltmarket Junction;
- Gallowgate; opened 19 December 1870; closed except for special purposes 1 October 1902; finally closed 1934;
- St Johns Junction; divergence for Bridgeton;
- College East Junction.

St Enoch section Southern arm:

- Clyde Junction;
- Glasgow Dunlop Street; opened 12 December 1870; closed 17 October 1876;
- Glasgow St Enoch; opened 17 October 1876; closed 27 June 1966.

Northern arm:

- St Enoch station; see above;
- Saltmarket Junction.

Main section north

- Bellgrove Junction;
- Duke Street;
- Haghill Junction;
- Alexandra Park; opened 1 July 1881; closed 1 January 1917; reopened 2 June 1919; renamed Alexandra Parade 9 July 1923;
- Blochairn; opened 1883; renamed Garngad 1885; closed 1 March 1910.
- Barnhill; opened 13 December 1886; closed 1 January 1917; reopened 1 February 1919; renamed Barnhill 8 June 1953;
- Sighthill Junction.

Langside Junction section

- Eglinton Street Junction;
- Gorbals; opened 1 September 1877; closed 1 June 1928;
- Langside Junction; junction with line to Kilmarnock.

Parkhead branch

- Haghill Junction;
- Parkhead Junction.

=== The Clyde Bridge ===
The CGUR built the first railway bridge over the River Clyde in the City of Glasgow, opened in 1870. It consisted of twin-lattice parallel iron girders in seven spans; the engineers were John Fowler and J. F. Blair, and the contractor was Thomas Brassey & Co.. Deep foundations to the piers required—up to 100 feet (30 m)—and cylinder caissons were lowered to firm rock by the use of a grab type excavator working within; the excavated face was kept under water.

In 1898 the bridge was reconstructed and widened for quadruple track; compressed air excavation for 13-foot (4.0 m) diameter steel piers were used. The structure consists of two variable depth continuous girders. The visible spandrel braced arches are not primary structural members. There is a decorative cast-iron cornice and parapet, and towers and half turrets in red sandstone. The work cost £67,970. It is a listed building, category B.

== Connections to other lines ==
- Edinburgh and Glasgow Railway at Sighthill Junction
- Garnkirk and Glasgow Railway at Sighthill Junction
- Coatbridge Branch of the North British Railway at Haghill Junction and Bellgrove
- Glasgow City and District Railway at High Street West Junction
- Glasgow, Barrhead and Neilston Direct Railway at Gorbals Junction
- Paisley Canal Line, General Terminus and Glasgow Harbour Railway and Glasgow and Paisley Joint Railway at Shields Junction
