= Glasgow, Barrhead and Kilmarnock Joint Railway =

Scottish railway line

Overview
- Locale: Scotland
- Dates of operation: 13 August 1869–28 October 1880
- Predecessor: Glasgow, Barrhead and Neilston Direct Railway
- Successor: Glasgow and South Western Railway and Caledonian Railway

Technical
- Track gauge: 1,435 mm (4 ft 8 1/2 in)

The Glasgow, Barrhead and Kilmarnock Joint Railway was a railway jointly owned by the Caledonian Railway and the Glasgow and South Western Railway, completed in 1873, and giving the latter a shorter access to its Carlisle main line. A branch to Beith was also built.

It was formed by extending the earlier independent Glasgow, Barrhead and Neilston Direct Railway, which is also described here; that line was taken over by the joint company.

The main line between Glasgow and Kilmarnock continues in operation at the present day. The station at Neilston was closed, and the locality is served by a different line.

== History ==
=== Glasgow, Barrhead and Neilston Direct Railway ===
Glasgow, Barrhead and Neilston Direct Railway Act 1845
- Act of Parliament
- Parliament of the United Kingdom
- Long title: An Act for making a Railway from Glasgow to Crofthead near the Town or Village of Neilston, to be called "The Glasgow, Barrhead, and Neilston Direct Railway."
- Citation: 8 & 9 Vict. c. cxcii

Dates
- Royal assent: 4 August 1845

Text of statute as originally enacted

Glasgow, Barrhead and Neilston Direct Railway (Branches to Thornliebank and Househill) Act 1846
- Act of Parliament
- Parliament of the United Kingdom
- Long title: An Act to enable the Glasgow, Barrhead, and Neilston Direct Railway Company to make Branch Railways to Thornliebank and Househill; and to amend the Act[m] relating to such Railway.
- Citation: 9 & 10 Vict. c. cxlii

Dates
- Royal assent: 3 July 1846

The Glasgow, Barrhead and Neilston Direct Railway (GB&NDR) was authorised by the Glasgow, Barrhead and Neilston Direct Railway Act 1845 (8 & 9 Vict. c. cxcii) on 4 August 1845 to build its line of nine miles (15 km) with a capital of £150,000. It was to run from a terminal on the south side of Glasgow to Crofthead, near Neilston. The location was the centre of several local industries, in the valley of the Cowdon Burn, on the Ayr Road below Neilston.

Two short branches, to Thornliebank, and to Househill were authorised in the following year by the Glasgow, Barrhead and Neilston Direct Railway (Branches to Thornliebank and Househill) Act 1846 (9 & 10 Vict. c. cxlii), with an additional £35,000 capital.

=== A Glasgow terminal ===
The Glasgow terminal was somewhat remote from the city—Glasgow Bridge carried a toll at this time—but a small railway company could ill afford a central terminus.

Many early railways had been simply a means to move coal and other heavy minerals from a pit to a waterway. By the 1840s it was evident that they had a more strategic role, and in 1846 a royal commission deliberated on the desirable location of passenger and goods terminals to serve the city of Glasgow and the quays on the Clyde.

Glasgow Southern Terminal Railway Act 1846
- Act of Parliament
- Parliament of the United Kingdom
- Long title: An Act for making a Railway from the Glasgow, Barrhead, and Neilston Direct Railway to the Caledonian Railway.
- Citation: 9 & 10 Vict. c. cci

Dates
- Royal assent: 16 July 1846

The Caledonian Railway (CR) had just been authorised (in 1845) and planned to get access to the city over the route of the Garnkirk and Glasgow Railway (by now transformed into the Glasgow, Garnkirk and Coatbridge Railway) which terminated at Townhead, in the north-east margin of the city. Taking a strategic view the CR hoped to get authorisation for a more central terminal, and it collaborate with the GB&NDR to promote a passenger terminal in the city centre. Together they proposed the Glasgow Southern Terminal Railway, which would be located near St Enoch's Square, crossing the Clyde near Glasgow Bridge. It got as far as an authorising act of Parliament, the Glasgow Southern Terminal Railway Act 1846 (9 & 10 Vict. c. cci), on 16 July 1846, but the details were left subject to approval by various authorities. In fact the Admiralty demanded a swing bridge for the Clyde crossing, and combined with other opposition, the scheme faced too much obstruction, and was reduced to the construction of a terminal station called South Side, in the angle of Pollokshaws Road and Cathcart Street.

Glasgow, Barrhead and Neilston Direct Railway Act 1847
- Act of Parliament
- Parliament of the United Kingdom
- Long title: An Act to authorize the Purchase of the Glasgow Southern Terminal Railway by the Glasgow, Barrhead, and Neilston Direct Railway Company, and to amend the Acts relating to the said Company.
- Citation: 10 & 11 Vict. c. xcv

Dates
- Royal assent: 2 July 1847

Text of statute as originally enacted

The Glasgow Southern Terminal Railway was absorbed by the GB&NDR by the Glasgow, Barrhead and Neilston Direct Railway Act 1847 (10 & 11 Vict. c. xcv) of 2 July 1847, which also authorised a deviation of the route. The CR also obtained authority to lease the GB&NDR line.

=== The Caledonian interest ===
At this period the Ardrossan Railway had grand plans to reach Glasgow from Ardrossan, where the 12th Earl of Eglinton had expended considerable sums improving the harbour; the Ardrossan Railway was largely sponsored by him. Its natural enemy was the Glasgow, Paisley, Kilmarnock and Ayr Railway (GPK&AR), which was building in that part of Ayrshire, and the Ardrossan company had purchased large quantities of GB&NDR shares, "to stop the Glasgow and Ayr swamping it". If the Ardrossan company was hostile to the GPK&AR, then the Caledonian was a friend of the Ardrossan. A physical link between the GB&NDR and the Ardrossan company had been suggested, and the Caledonian calculated that possession of the GB&NDR would give it access to much of Ayrshire, beating off the GPK&AR. (Note: The GPK&AR formed the Glasgow and South Western Railway (G&SWR) in 1850.) In 1846 the Ardrossan Railway Company had obtained an act of Parliament giving it authority to build a line from Crofthead, intended terminus of the GB&NDR, and Kilwinning and Kilmarnock.

=== The GB&NDR opens ===
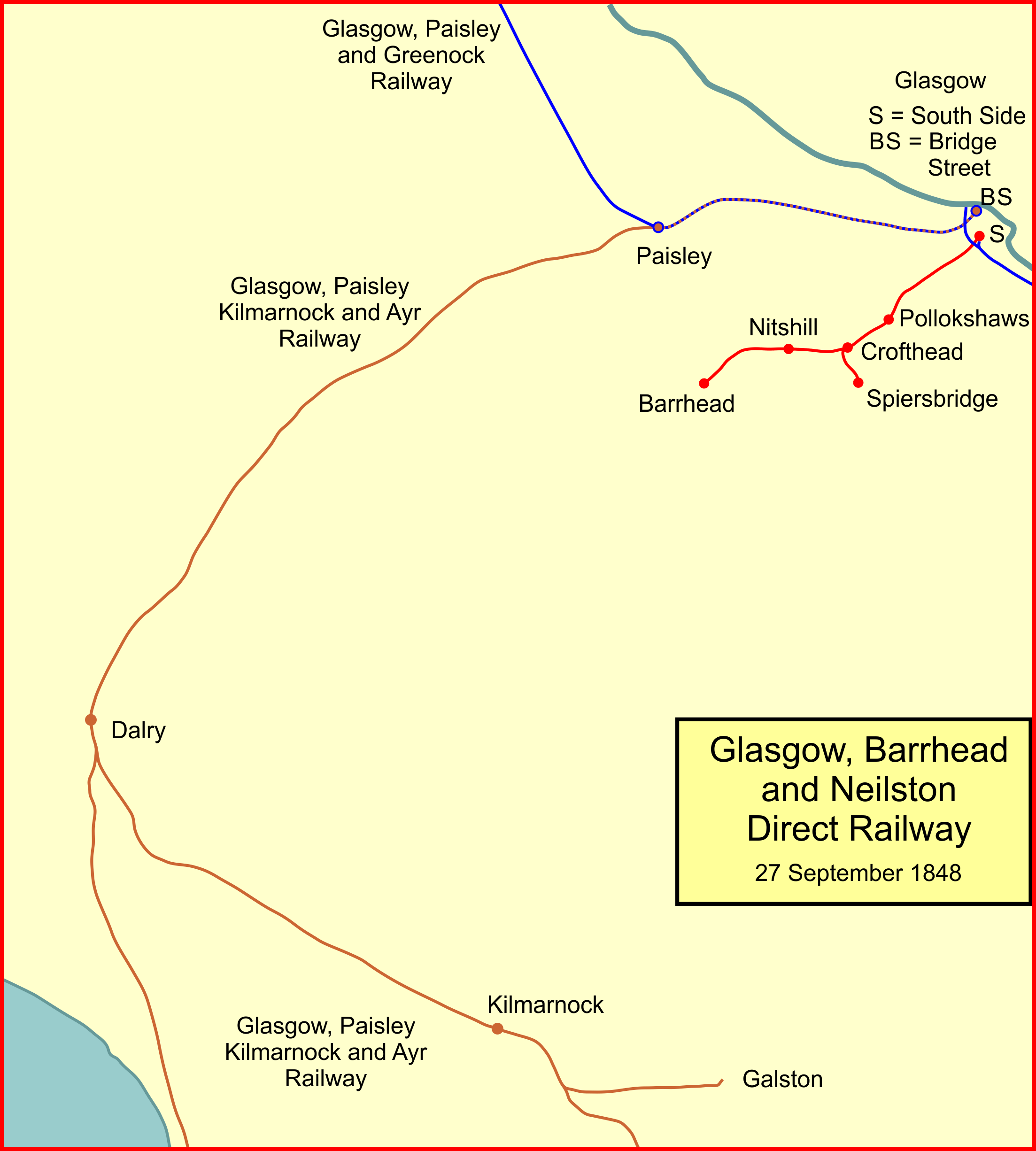
GB&NDR system in 1848

The GB&NDR opened its line as far a Barrhead terminus on 27 September 1848; the station was in the Grahamston district below the town, and on the north-west side of the Water of Levern. The Glasgow station was South Side.

=== Lease finalised ===
Caledonian Railway (Glasgow, Barrhead and Neilston Direct Railway Lease) Act 1849
- Act of Parliament
- Parliament of the United Kingdom
- Long title: An Act to effectuate a Lease of the Glasgow, Barrhead, and Neilston Direct Railway to the Caledonian Railway Company.
- Citation: 12 & 13 Vict. c. xc

Dates
- Royal assent: 1 August 1849

Text of statute as originally enacted

The 1847 act of Parliament had merely authorised the lease by the Caledonian; the terms had to be negotiated, and these were being finalised by a further act of Parliament, the Caledonian Railway (Glasgow, Barrhead and Neilston Direct Railway Lease) Act 1849 (12 & 13 Vict. c. xc) of 1 August 1849, by which time the CR had succeeded in reducing its financial commitment to the original GB&NDR shareholders; even so the outlay was £16,500 on a 999-year lease; "receipts were barely enough to cover the working costs".

=== South Side station ===
On 1 June 1849 the Clydesdale Junction Railway (CJR) was completed, terminating at South Side station. The CJR was effectively under the control of the Caledonian Railway, and trains to and from England now used the station. From 10 September 1849 trains from the Hamilton line also used the station. In that year the station was rebuilt to a design of William Tite; although cramped, the facade was imposing.

=== Extending to Kilmarnock ===
Crofthead and Kilmarnock Extension Railway Act 1865
- Act of Parliament
- Parliament of the United Kingdom
- Long title: An Act for making a Railway from the Caledonian Railway at Crofthead to Kilmarnock, with a Branch to Beith, in the Counties of Renfrew and Ayr; and for other Purposes.
- Citation: 28 & 29 Vict. c. cxxxix

Dates
- Royal assent: 29 June 1865

Text of statute as originally enacted

In 1865 the G&SWR promoted a bill to build a line from Kilmarnock to Glasgow via Stewarton—the direct route which the citizens of Kilmarnock had wanted from the GBK&AR at the outset. The Caledonian responded with a bill to extend the Glasgow Barrhead and Neilston Direct Railway, which they leased and worked, from Crofthead (i.e. Neilston) to Kilmarnock. Both these schemes obtained acts of Parliament, the Crofthead and Kilmarnock Extension Railway Act 1865 (28 & 29 Vict. c. cxxxix) and the Glasgow and South-western Railway (Kilmarnock Direct) Act 1865 (28 & 29 Vict. c. lxxiv). The lines would be closely parallel, and at this time the respective shareholders strenuously made it clear that the duplicate expenditure was wasteful.

Caledonian and Glasgow and South Western Railways (Kilmarnock Joint Line) Act 1869
- Act of Parliament
- Parliament of the United Kingdom
- Long title: An Act for improving and completing a direct line of railway communication between Glasgow and Kilmarnock, via Crofthead, and for vesting the same in the Caledonian and Glasgow and South-western Railway Companies; and for abandoning the Kilmarnock Direct Railway; and for other purposes.
- Citation: 32 & 33 Vict. c. xcviii

Dates
- Royal assent: 12 July 1869

Text of statute as originally enacted

At first the compromise was that the two routes would converge at Stewarton, continuing as a single route to the G&SWR station at Kilmarnock. In fact the proposals were held in suspense for some time, until in the 1869 session a bill was put forward merging the schemes entirely: the rival companies agreed to build the line jointly from Crofthead to Kilmarnock. This was authorised by a fresh act of Parliament, the Caledonian and Glasgow and South Western Railways (Kilmarnock Joint Line) Act 1869 (32 & 33 Vict. c. xcviii) on 12 July 1869, which cancelled the two earlier acts. The line was to be called the Glasgow, Barrhead and Kilmarnock Joint Line. The G&SWR had already constructed a short length northwards from Kilmarnock, and now extended that to make an end on junction with the GB&NDR line at Neilston. By then a new station had been opened at Neilston, on 27 March 1871, forming the temporary southern extremity of the GB&NDR line.

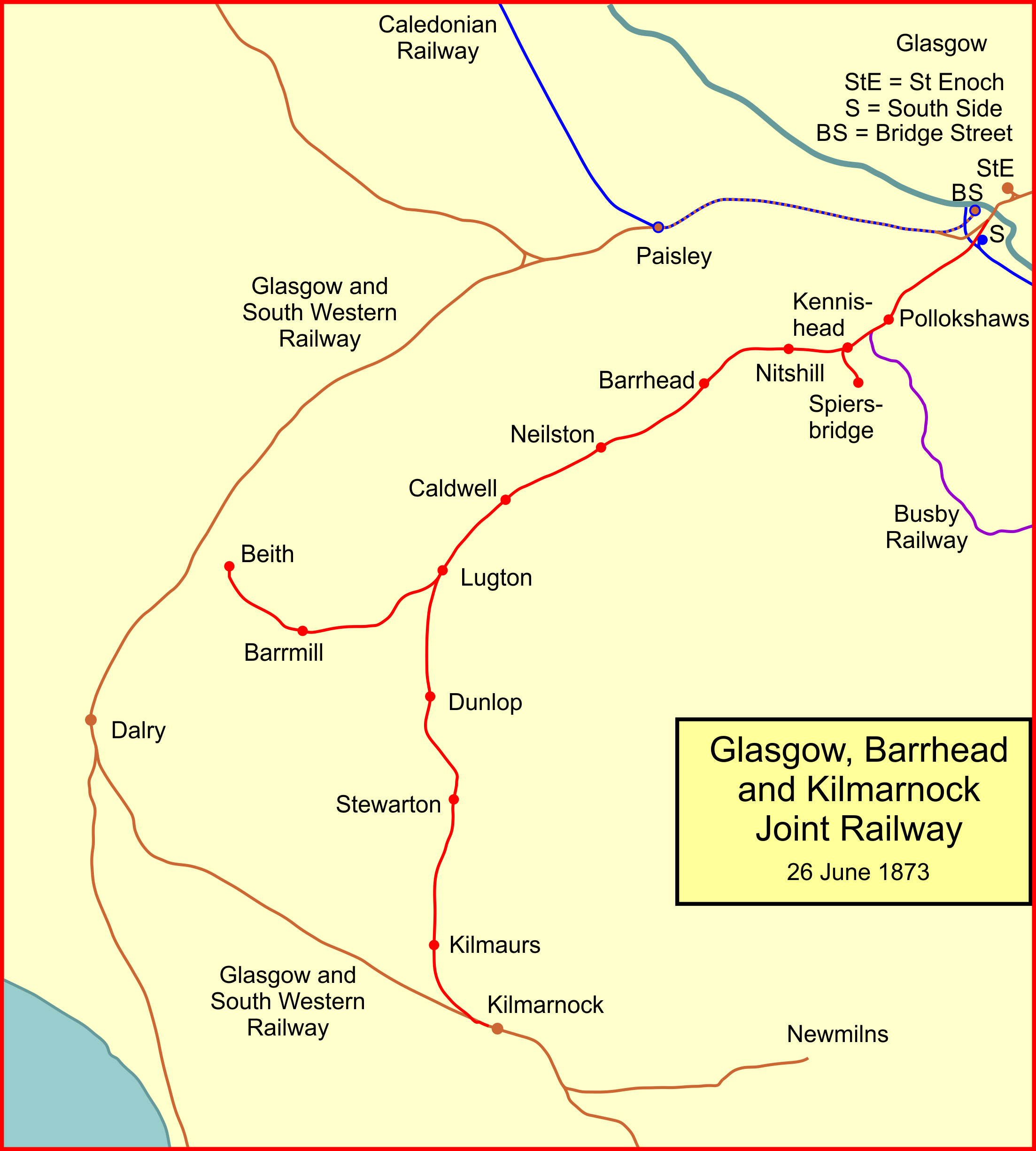
GB&KJR system in 1873

The line between Barrhead and Neilston was closed temporarily from 1 May 1870 to enable the doubling of the line; the new Neilston station was located a short distance on the Kilmarnock side of the former location.

The Caledonian and Glasgow and South Western Railways (Kilmarnock Joint Line) Act 1869 had authorised building a short connecting line from near South Side to the City of Glasgow Union Railway, which had been authorised in 1863, so as to enable G&SWR trains on the Kilmarnock line to reach the planned St Enoch (passenger) and College (goods) terminals. The act included a clause imposing a penalty of £60,000 if the through line were not ready by 28 June 1872.

Glasgow and Kilmarnock Joint Line (Extension of Time) Act 1872
- Act of Parliament
- Parliament of the United Kingdom
- Long title: An Act for extending the time for the completion of certain portions of the Glasgow and Kilmarnock Joint Line of Railway; for reviving the powers of compulsory purchase of Lands for the purposes thereof; for authorising the construction of a Branch Railway in connexion with the Joint Line; for empowering the Glasgow and South-western Railway Company to acquire Land at Kilmarnock; and for other purposes.
- Citation: 35 & 36 Vict. c. xii

Dates
- Royal assent: 13 May 1872

Text of statute as originally enacted

In fact the deadline was not met: the line was opened only as far as Stewarton on 27 March 1871. An act of Parliament of 25 July 1872, the Glasgow and Kilmarnock Joint Line (Extension of Time) Act 1872 (35 & 36 Vict. c. xii), removed the penalty as well as clarifying the City Union line connection. The through route was opened on 26 June 1873. As well as the line from Glasgow to Kilmarnock, there was a branch to Beith from Barrmill, opened on the same day. However the Glasgow terminal remained the awkwardly located South Side station: the connection towards St Enoch was not ready. (Note: Highet implies on page 38 that it was opened in 1873.) The former Glasgow, Barrhead and Neilston Direct Railway company was bought out.

The new route was difficult to operate: "a veritable switchback" with 3½ miles (5 km) of 1 in 67-70 on Neilston bank.

The G&SWR discontinued its passenger service from South Side station towards Kilmarnock on 1 September 1877.

== Rationalisation ==
While Glasgow commuting built up in the 1960s, the outer limit of frequent passenger train services was Barrhead. The Neilston station on the line was closed, as the alternative line to Neilston High was electrified. The East Kilbride line, branching from the Kilmarnock line at Busby Junction, assumed greater importance as the housing construction there developed.

The track between Barrhead and Kilmarnock was singled as part of the rationalisation of the route in the mid 1970s following the electrification of the West Coast Main Line, with a passing loop at Lugton. However, in 2009 the section between Stewarton and Lugton was redoubled, forming a dynamic loop, as part of capacity improvements between Glasgow and Kilmarnock.

The section from Strathbungo Junction to Cumberland Street Junction, by which trains reached the City Union Line from 1873, was closed beyond Langside Junction in 1973 and lifted (the remainder is still in use for freight).

The line to Beith closed to passengers on 5 November 1962 and to freight two years later.

In 1968 the severity of rationalisation was such that the line was to be closed, and trains diverted via Paisley and Dalry—the original GPK&AR route. In the event this was not done, and the Dalry - Kilmarnock route closed.

== Current operations ==
As of 2015 the main line is open and carries a typically half-hourly passenger service running from Glasgow to Barrhead and then all stations to Kilmarnock; in addition a half-hourly service runs from Glasgow Central to Barrhead, calling at all stations. There is a limited Sunday service.

At Lugton, there is a goods-only branch line to Barrmill Munitions Depot; however the rail facility is dormant. The route uses the first part of the Beith branch as far as Barrmill, then continuing on the former Lanarkshire and Ayrshire Railway route.

== Topography ==
Note: entries in italics were not passenger stations. Entries in bold are still open.

- Cumberland Street Junction; junction from City of Glasgow Union Railway;
- Langside Junction; junction from Larkfield Junction on Motherwell line (CR);
- Strathbungo Junction; junction from General Terminus, CR;
- Strathbungo; opened 1 December 1877; closed 28 May 1962;
- **Crossmyloof**; opened June 1888;
- Pollokshaws; **Pollokshaws West** from 1952;
- Busby Junction; junction towards East Kilbride (Busby Railway);
- Crofthead; **Kennishead** from 1850; junction for Spiersbridge; (also known as Kinnishead, Thornliebank and Spiersbridge variously before 1850);
- **Nitshill**;
- **Priesthill and Darnley**; opened 1990;
- **Barrhead**; junction for Potterhill (G&SWR); relocated 17 October 1978;
- Crofthead; Neilston from 1868; closed 1 May 1870;
- Neilston; opened 27 March 1871; Neilston Low 1953; closed 7 November 1966;
- Caldwell; Uplawmoor from 1962; closed 7 November 1966;
- Lugton; junction from Neilston High (L&AR); junction towards Beith; closed 7 November 1966;
- **Dunlop**; closed 7 November 1966; reopened 5 June 1967;
- **Stewarton**; opened 27 March 1871; closed 7 November 1966; reopened 5 May 1967;
- **Kilmaurs**; closed 7 November 1966; relocated and reopened 12 May 1984;
- **Kilmarnock**; junction from Dalry (G&SWR).

Spiersbridge branch

- Crofthead;
- Spiersbridge; opened 27 September 1848; closed 1 May 1849; sometimes spelt Speirsbridge;
- Spiersbridge goods.

Beith branch

- Lugton;
- Barrmill; opened 26 June 1873; closed 5 November 1962;
- Beith; opened 26 June 1873; Beith Town 1953; closed 5 November 1962.

== Sources ==
- Butt, R. V. J. (October 1995). The Directory of Railway Stations: details every public and private passenger station, halt, platform and stopping place, past and present (1st ed.). Sparkford: Patrick Stephens Ltd. ISBN 978-1-85260-508-7. OCLC 60251199. OL 11956311M.
- Stansfield, G. (1999). Ayrshire & Renfrewshire's Lost Railways. Ochiltree: Stenlake Publishing. ISBN 1-8403-3077-5.
- "Glasgow, Barrhead and Neilston Direct Railway". Railscot.
- "Glasgow, Barrhead and Kilmarnock Joint Railway". Railscot.
