= Eglinton =

Eglinton can refer to:

== People ==
- Earl of Eglinton, a title in the Peerage of Scotland
- Geoffrey Eglinton (1927–2016), British chemist
- Timothy Eglinton, a British biogeoscientist
- William Eglinton (1857–1933), a British spiritualist medium and fraud
- J.Z. Eglinton, pseudonym of Walter H. Breen Jr. (1928–1993)
- John Eglinton, pseudonym of William Kirkpatrick Magee (1868–1961)

== Places ==
=== Australia ===
- Eglinton, New South Wales, a suburb of Bathurst
- Eglinton, Western Australia, a suburb of Perth

=== Canada ===
==== Toronto ====
- Eglinton, Ontario, a former village now in Toronto
- Eglinton (federal electoral district), a former federal electoral district
- Eglinton (provincial electoral district), a former provincial electoral district
- Eglinton Avenue, a main thoroughfare in Toronto
- Eglinton Park
- Eglinton Theatre
- Line 5 Eglinton or Eglinton Crosstown, a light rail line of the Toronto subway
  - Eglinton Maintenance and Storage Facility, a light-rail facility serving Line 5 Eglinton

==== Canadian Territories ====
- Eglinton Island, Northwest Territories, one of the Queen Elizabeth Islands in the Canadian Arctic
- Cape Eglinton, a land point on eastern Baffin Island, Canada
  - Eglinton Fiord

=== New Zealand ===
- Eglinton River

=== United Kingdom ===
- Eglinton, County Londonderry, a village in Northern Ireland
  - City of Derry Airport, known as Eglinton airport, and formerly RAF Eglinton
    - RAF Eglinton/RNAS Eglinton, a former Royal Naval Air Station
- Eglinton Country Park, North Ayrshire, Scotland
  - Eglinton Castle
  - Eglinton Loch

== Other uses ==
- HMS Eglinton, the name of two Royal Navy ships

== See also ==
- Eglinton coupling, a chemical reaction
- Eglinton reaction, a chemical reaction
- Eglinton station (disambiguation)
- Eglington (disambiguation)
