= Caldwell, East Renfrewshire =

Mansion in East Renfrewshire, Scotland

Coordinates: 55°45′18″N 4°31′38″W

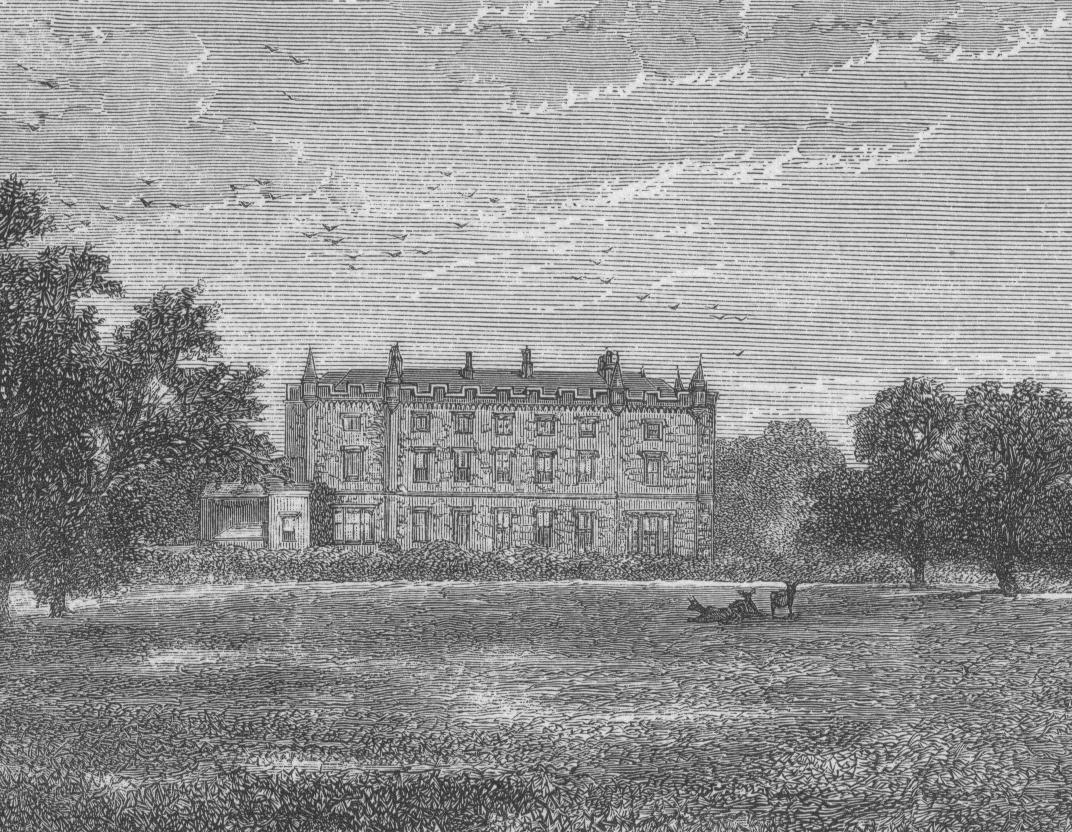
Caldwell House in the 1870s

Caldwell is a mansion and old estate with the remains of a castle nearby. These lands lie close to the Lugton Water and the villages of Uplawmoor in East Renfrewshire and Lugton in East Ayrshire.

== History ==
=== Caldwell Castle and tower ===
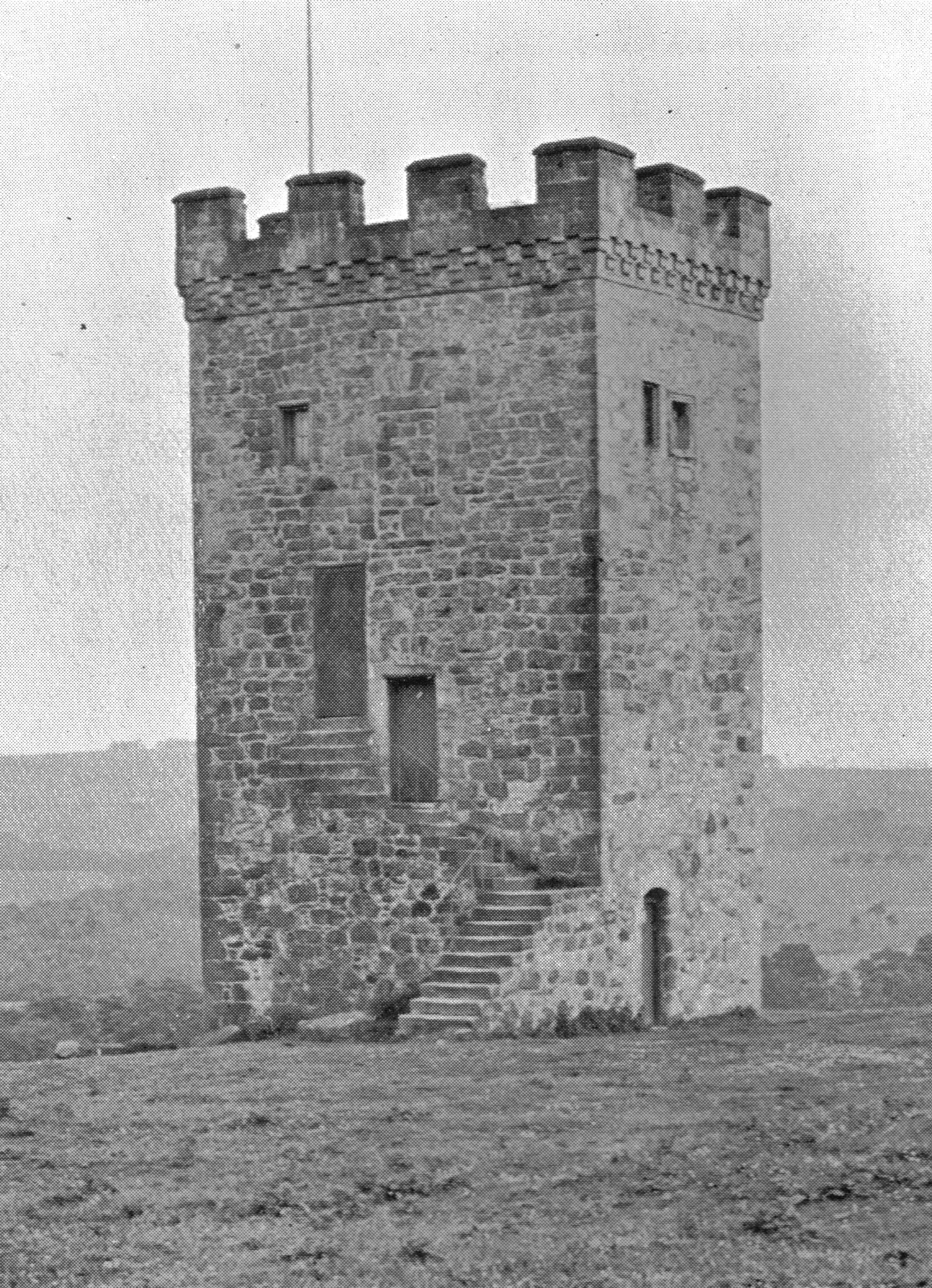
The Caldwell Place tower in 1910.

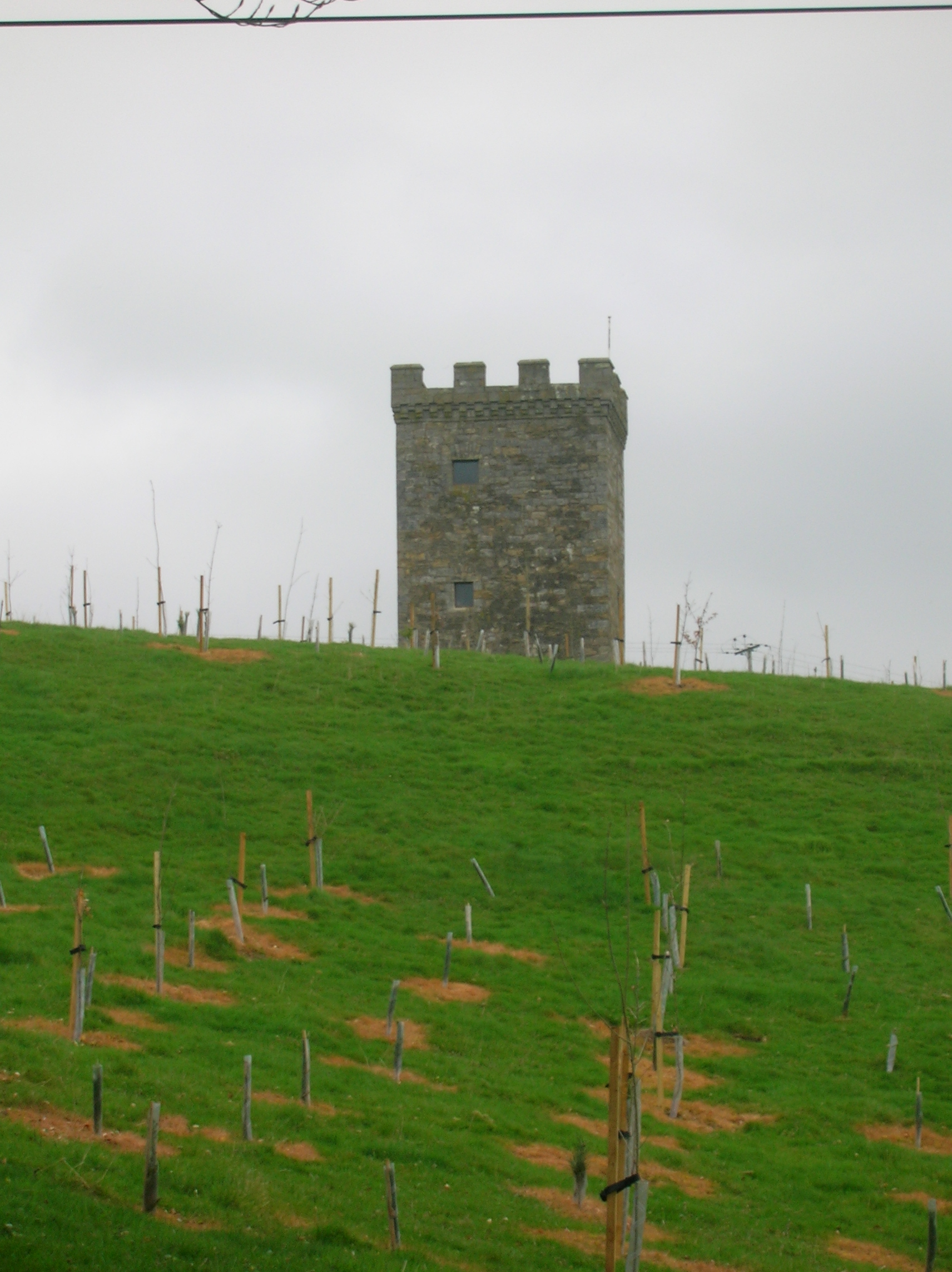
The Caldwell Tower 'Folly' near Uplawmoor.

The present day Caldwell Tower (NS 4223 5512), stands on an elevation, and is a small, free-standing tower of probable 16th-century date although it may represent part of a larger castle now lost through robbing of stone for other uses. Square on plan, of good coursed rubble, it contains three stories beneath the parapet. This is carried on two courses of individual corbels. The crenellations seem to have been renewed.

The door at ground floor level is in the west wall and admits to a vaulted basement, which does not communicate with the upper stories. The first floor, also vaulted, is reached via a modern forestair. The flooring above has been altered. The windows are small, and there are signs of built-up gun-loops in the walling. The fabric throughout is in fair condition. This tower is thought to have been part of the courtyard-type Caldwell Castle. Rubble, possibly from demolished ancillary buildings has been noted at the site.

Ainslie's map of 1775 indicates a 'pigeon house' or 'doocot' at the position of the tower, indicating a later use of this castle remnant. Some indications of the tower being a focal point of the pleasure gardens, linked to a belvedere have been suggested. The 1832 map of Renfrewshire by John Thomson shows the tower clearly and marks it as 'Bacon H.' suggesting that it was then in use as a building for curing hams.

In 2011, the tower was restored for use as a dwelling with the addition of a small ground-floor extension and a staircase to first-floor level. The restoration, which was featured on the series The Restoration Man, is the subject of much controversy.

=== The Mures, Caldwell House and the estate ===
==== The Mures ====
In 1294 the estate of Caldwell had boundaries which abutted the Steward's forest of Fereneze. Sir Reginald More or Mure, of Abercorn, held the lands of Cowdams near Symington even before 1328 and his son Gilchrist Mure of Cowdams acquired the lands and castle of Caldwell through marriage to the heiress of Caldwell of that Ilk. John Mure was designed 'of Caldwell' in 1409. In about 1450 Ramshead, Biggart, and Little Highgate (in the Barony of Giffen) lands were granted to the family. The estate of Little Caldwell remained with the Caldwells of that Ilk until the late 17th century and was added later to the larger estate by purchase. The most ancient seat of the Mure family was Polkelly, near Kilmarnock.

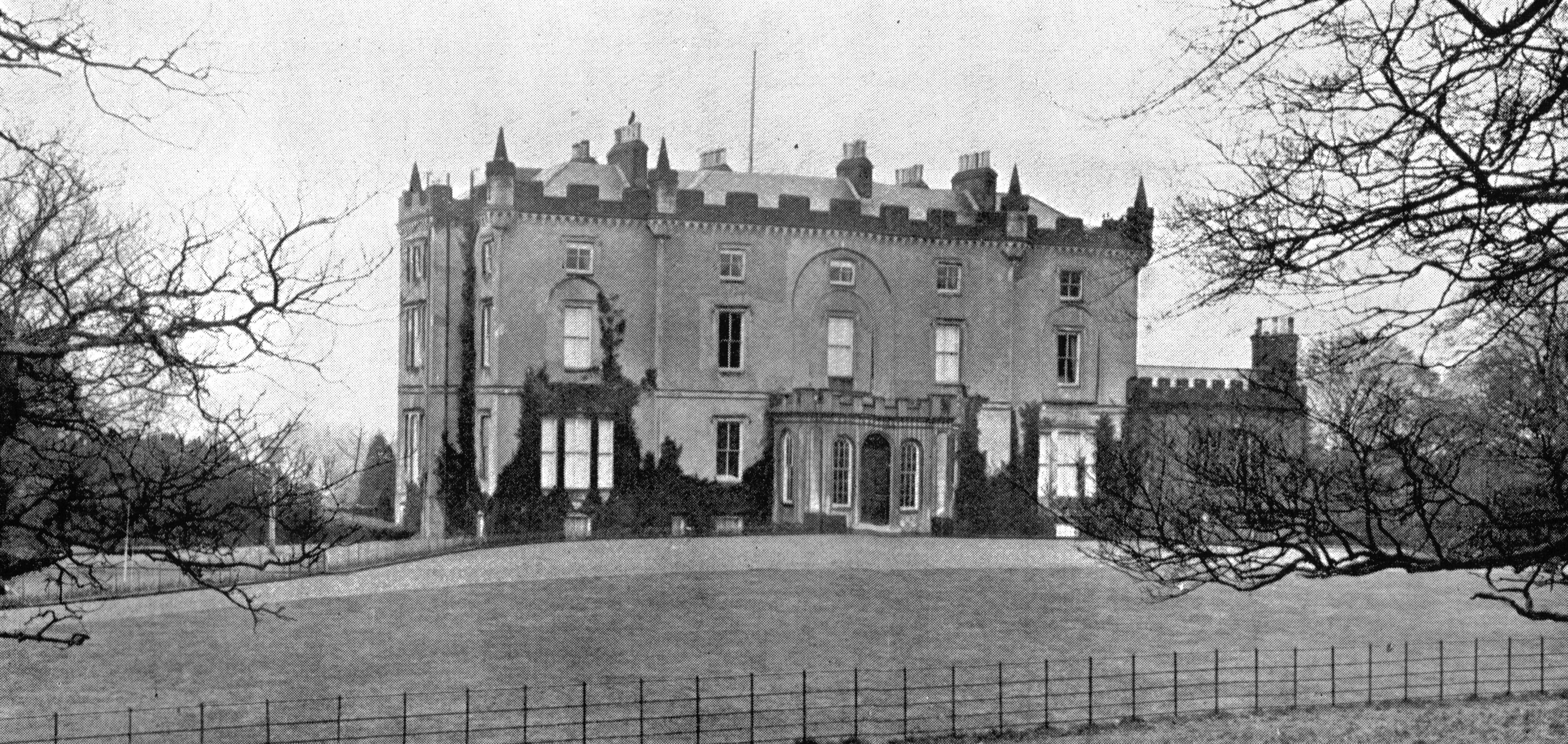
Caldwell House circa 1910.

When King David II was taken prisoner at the battle of Nevill's Cross, Sir William Mure of Caldwell was appointed as one of the twelve nobles who negotiated the terms for his release. He was held as hostage until the ransom was paid in full.

William Mure was a Baron of the Scottish Exchequer and factor for the Scottish estates of the Earl of Bute.

William and Alexander Cunninghame of Aiket castle were accused of the murder of Sir John Mure of Caldwell on the lands of Bordland in 1570, but were acquitted. Alexander was involved in the murder of Hugh Montgomerie, 4th Earl of Eglinton at the Annick Ford in Stewarton and was murdered in turn as a result, whilst the father was poisoned by his own wife! John's son, Robert Mure of Caldwell, bought lands at Kittochside. This resulted in decades of feud with the Reid family.

Colonel William Mure the laird in the early 20th century, was married to the Honorable Lady Georgiana Montgomerie of Eglinton Castle, eldest daughter of the Earl of Eglinton and Winton. Their only son was William Alexander Mure, born at Eglinton Castle in 1912, the same year his father died, was the last member of the family to be born in Scotland.

The burial vault of the Mures of Caldwell is in Neilston church, under the gothic window at the north end of the church. Only those Mures who were in the direct line of succession were permitted to be buried here. The family's patronage of Neilston church was later disposed to the Mures of Glanderston.

==== The Mansion houses ====
As stated, the old castle of Caldwell sat on a knoll of the sloping hill-side to the south-west of Lochlibo. Only one tower remained as a prominent landmark after the times of the Covenanters and today's (2007) surviving tower is this same remnant. A new mansion house was built around 1712 by William Mure on the lands of Ramshead, however the present Robert Adam designed house was built by his son, William 'Baron Mure' about 200 yards lower down from the original. Caldwell is the last in a series of early experimental houses in the castle style which began in England with Ugbrooke House and in Scotland with Mellerstain House in Berwickshire. The house is protected as a Category A listed building.

In 1799, Jean Hunter Mure, writing from Caldwell, records that Mr Mure is at present in the very agony of making a new garden on the Brandy Hill behind the stables and offices. He has converted the old house into stables and means next year to take away the offices entirely which will make an immense improvement to the place for at present they are not a beautiful ornament. This new garden was extensive and incorporated a hot-house.

Caldwell House was the Mure family home until 1909 when Col Mure decided that the running costs were too high and moved the family to the extended and improved Hall of Caldwell, leasing the mansion house.

In 1923 the estate with 280 acres, offices, walled garden and mansion house were sold to the Govan District Board of control for £7,500. In 1927 Govan District Health Board converted the building into a hospital for the mentally insane and later a children's home which operated until 1985. Alterations, including the removal of the main stair to accommodate a lift shaft, led to a general decline in the state of the interior. External changes also occurred. These included fire escapes and additional boiler room and laundry buildings attached to the house. In 1987 the estate was sold off in lots by the Secretary of State. In 1995 a serious fire caused further internal deterioration and the loss of most of the roof. The building has been on the Scottish Civic Trust's Buildings at Risk register for some years. In 2006 attempts to secure restoration of the building through a Council led restoration project were initiated.

==== The policies and estate ====
The holm in front of Caldwell House was called 'Blackstands Meadow' on the 1860 OS and other areas are called 'Bells Bog', 'William Covert', 'Melons Wood', 'Ram's Head', 'Crow Wood' and finally 'Horner's Corner' where a large garden centre has been established over the last decade or so (2007). The Saugh Avenue (Scots for Willow) runs from the back of Caldwell House, across the Blackstands holm, crosses the Lugton Water and joins the A736 near the Fifthpart Covert just before the old brickworks site. This was the main entrance in the 1820s and 'Keepers cottage' may be the building marked on Saugh avenue. The road originally continued along the line of what is now a plantation to join up with the lane near Fifthpart farm. The brickworks site opposite Horners corner was called the Castlewat Plantation on Thomson's 1820 map.

The name 'Blackstands' may derive from 'Blackston' as the Mure's were the Lairds of Blackston. Nether Ramshead was a Mure property from early times, being recorded as such in 1617, together with Cawdamis (near Symington), Hiegaittis, Knokewart and Dunyflat.

Etymology
Caldwell comes from Keld as in Dunkeld The termination Well gives us 'The Well in the Wood.' This could refer to the old well in the policies, known as the 'Brandy Well.'

Sir William Cunninghame of Cunninghamhead married Elizabeth Nicolson in 1619 and had a daughter Barbara, who married William Mure of Caldwell. She suffered greatly for her presbyterian beliefs in 'the bad times' of the 'Highland Host', as did her father. Waterlands is recorded since 1603 as belonging to John Montgomery of Achenbothy and passed in to the hands of the Caldwell estate before becoming privately owned.

Duniflett, now Duniflatt was part of the estate in 1604, up until at least the 1880s. Muirtoun is marked by Pont, but seems to have been covered by the extended plantations established by Lieutenant-Colonel William Mure.

==== A raid upon Glasgow's Bishop's castle ====
In 1515 Glasgow's Bishop's Castle was rifled by John Mure, Laird of Caldwell during the earliest days of what was to become the Scottish Reformation. The laird besieged with artillery and took the castle, he then made off with the bishop's principal goods and chattels as fair and legitimate booty. James V was a child still and the Duke of Albany was the regent. He was made to answer to the Lords of Council, found guilty and was forced to pay reparation. His actions reflected the people's growing unease with the power and wealth of the church.

==== Covenanters and the Pentland Rising ====
In 1666 an armed rising of the Covenanters took place under Colonel Wallace which ended in disaster at the Battle of Pentland. William Mure of Caldwell, the Laird of Blackston in Renfrewshire, was the leader of a group of about fifty, including the famous zealot Robert Ker of Kersland, who hoped to join up, but they were prevented by the presence of the King's troops. William, despite assisting the King's troops in prosecuting the others in his group, lost his lands to General Dalziel. The family regained the property after the overthrow of King James VII in 1688.

== Hall of Caldwell ==
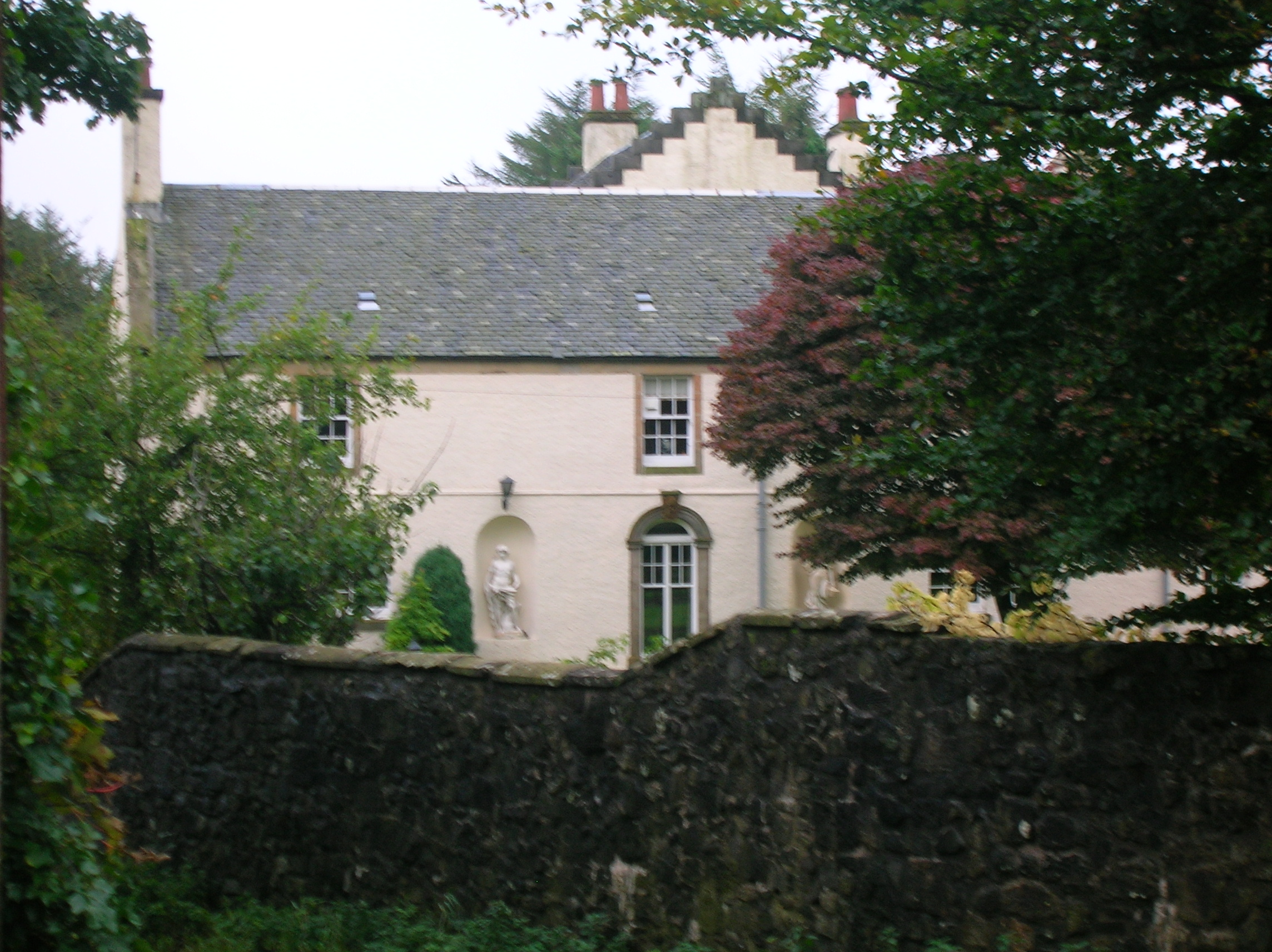
Hall of Caldwell in 2008 showing some of the extensive alterations and extensions.

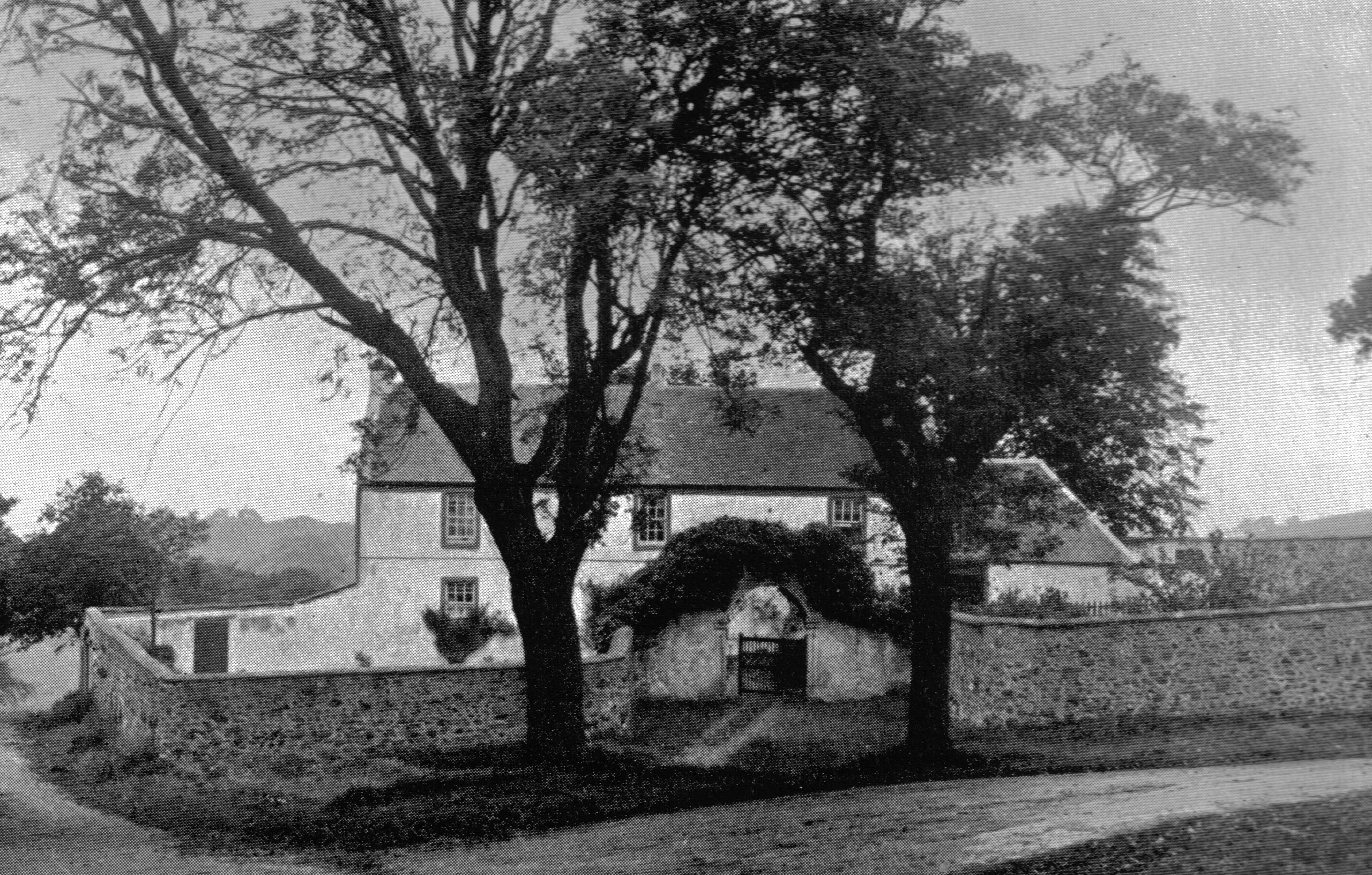
Hall of Caldwell circa 1909.

This property (Map ref: NS 4141 5504) lies 1 1/2 miles (2.5 kilometres) west of Uplawmoor in East Renfrewshire, sitting on the B775 Gleniffer Road. It was also known as Little Caldwell or Wester Caldwell and lies in the hamlet or farm town of Hall, next to Hall Farm. In the 17th century it returned a Member to the Scottish Parliament, the 'Guidman of that Ilk,' the title referring to a person who held land from a Laird. The Laird sent the tenant of the Hall of Caldwell to Parliament in his place and paid his expenses of £13 6s 8d. Timothy Pont's map shows a tower house at this location in 1596. The tower house became a hall house during the time that it was held by the Caldwells of that Ilk. The hall on the first floor of the dwelling is now divided into two rooms.

In 1909 Colonel Mure extended the hall by adding a commodious 'modern' addition. In 1927 the architects Allan Stevenson, Mair & Cassells, were responsible for further addition, alterations and a new garden wall. A category 'B' Listed Building, the date 1684 is to be found on an archway at the walled garden.

Previous to the Covenanting times the open green in front of the old Hall of Caldwell was a favourite place for dance gatherings on summer Sunday evenings, with people coming from Neilston, Lochwinnoch, and Beith.

In the 1870s a Robert Montgomerie, who had occupied the farm of Bruchag on Bute left for Hall of Caldwell and later moved to Lessnessock. John Cuninghame Montgomerie of Dalmore House was a relative.

== Micro history ==
A local tradition was that an underground passage or Ley tunnel ran from Caldwell House to the old Lugton Inn (now demolished), however a search by owners in the cellars did not reveal any signs of a hidden passage.

Like many of the other Cunninghame lairds, the Mures had a townhouse in Irvine.

Mr. Mure of Caldwell attended the Eglinton Tournament of 1839.

A station called Caldwell existed near Uplawmoor. It opened in 1871 and was renamed to Uplawmoor upon the closure of the station with the same name on the Lanarkshire and Ayrshire Railway in 1962. In 1966 Caldwell was renamed 'Tannochbrae' and dressed with period detail for one day on 11 October to allow the filming of an episode of Dr. Finlay's Casebook. 'J36' 0-6-0 No. 65345 was provided for the filming, together with two Caledonian coaches.

The Lochlibo Road runs through the strath and this was the old turnpike, completed from Glasgow by Lugton, to Kilmarnock, Irvine and Ayr in 1820 at the cost of £18,000.

The ten acre Halket Loch once lay near the toll road from Duniflat between the various Halket Farms, Lochridgehills, and Craighead Law.

The hamlet of Shillford lies on the Lochlibo Road near Uplawmoor. This settlement grew up around the old toll on the Irvine to Glasgow turnpike.

== See also ==
- Cowden Hall, East Renfrewshire - once owned by the Mures of Caldwell
- Destruction of country houses in 20th-century Britain
- Restoration of castles in Scotland
