= Eglington =

Eglington may refer to:

== People ==
- Nathan Eglington (born 1980), Australian hockey player
- Richard Eglington (1908–1979), English cricketer
- Tommy Eglington (1923–2004), Irish footballer
- Eglington Margaret Pearson (c. 1746 – 1823), English stained glass painter

== Other uses ==
- Eglington Cemetery, Clarksboro, New Jersey, U.S.

== See also ==
- Eglinton (disambiguation)
- John Eglington Bailey (1840–1888), English antiquary
- Egling, a municipality in Bavaria, Germany
