= Shillford =

Coordinates: 55.7745°N 4.4770°W

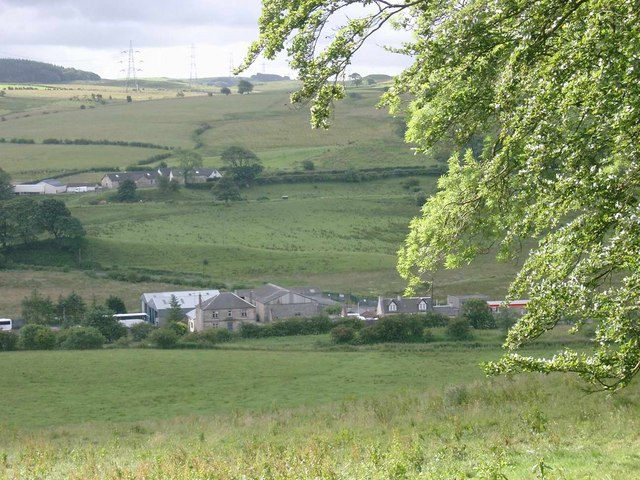
- A view of the hamlet of Shillford

- Location within East Renfrewshire
- OS grid reference: NS4472756250
- Council area: East Renfrewshire
- Country: Scotland
- Sovereign state: United Kingdom
- Post town: Glasgow
- Dialling code: 01505
- Police: Scotland
- Fire: Scottish
- Ambulance: Scottish
- Scottish Parliament: Eastwood

Shillford or Shilford is a hamlet to the south-west of Barrhead on the Lochlibo Road in East Renfrewshire near Uplawmoor, Scotland in the parish of Neilston. It is located around 11 miles (18 km) south-west of Glasgow and north of Kilmarnock, and around 5 miles (8 km) south of Paisley.

== Meaning of place-name ==
The name may derive from the word ford and the Scots word shill, meaning cold or chilly; the word is also said to mean shallow. The old ford ceased to exist after the building of the railway that runs beside Loch Libo as the nearby cutting resulted in the Thorter Burn being diverted to run into the loch.

== History ==
In 1910 the hamlet had a population of 46. The shallow ford at the hamlet was formed by the Thorter Burn that ran into a hollow on the old road. Shillford Mill was a substantial grain and sawmill, still operating in the 1960s. It was located close to the present day Shillford Garage. (datum 2012) The site is now used as a lorry park. The old smithy is now a roofless ruin and the site of the old toll house is an overgrown plot. Shillford Mill's office building still stands as a private dwelling named 'Shilford Mill' (sic) (datum 2012). Shillford once had two inns, however the licences were revoked prior to 1912.

=== Cartographic evidence ===
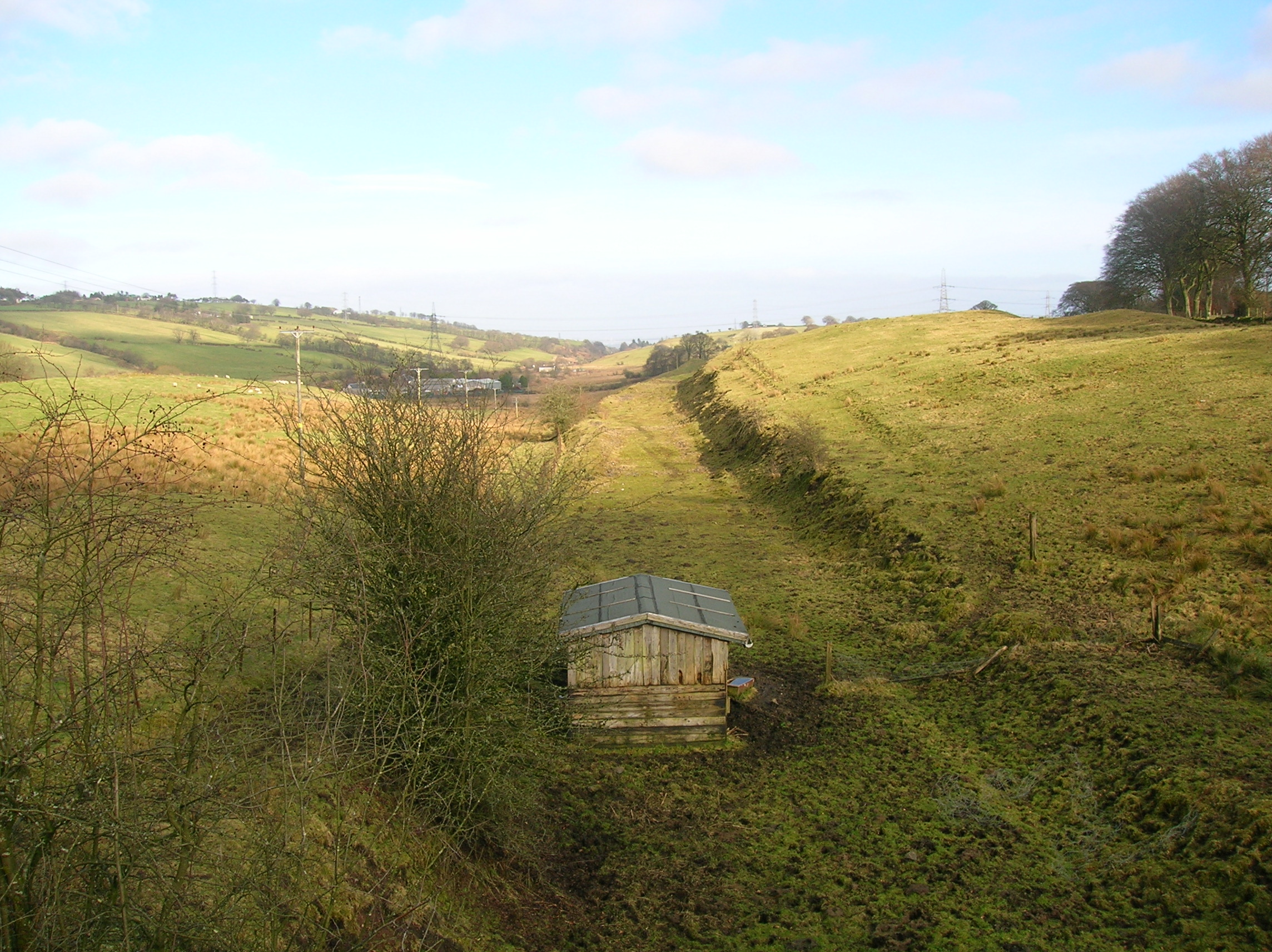
The old railway looking towards Neilston at Shillford Bridge.

An 1821 map shows the name Shillford at the site of the present day Shillford Cottage. The 1826 map shows Shillford Toll on the Lochlibo turnpike and the crossroads with a probable toll keeper's house.

In 1856 the toll gate is still shown with a group of buildings opposite the toll keepers house and another building at the site of the Shillford Mill, probably one of the inns. Two quarries are located in the woods near Shillford Cottage, one disused. In 1895 Shillford Quarry is somewhat enlarged and a smithy is marked on Lochlibo Road next to the inn. The Glasgow, Barrhead and Kilmarnock Joint Railway, is shown with a signal box on this the double track section. A small quarry is also marked at Taphead.

By 1912 a large sawmill and a smaller meal mill are located near to the smithy and farrier. The Lanarkshire and Ayrshire Railway is shown for the first time with sidings running into Shillford Quarry. The buildings marked as 'Lagavulin' on the edge of the quarry wood are first shown in 1898. By 1967 the Lanarkshire and Ayrshire Railway is shown as closed and lifted, Shillford Quarry disused, the old toll keeper's house demolished, the mill used as a storage depot, and only one house remaining, 'Viewfield' near the Glasgow, Barrhead and Kilmarnock Joint Railway on which the signal box has been closed. A Smithy Cottage is marked.

== Micro-history ==
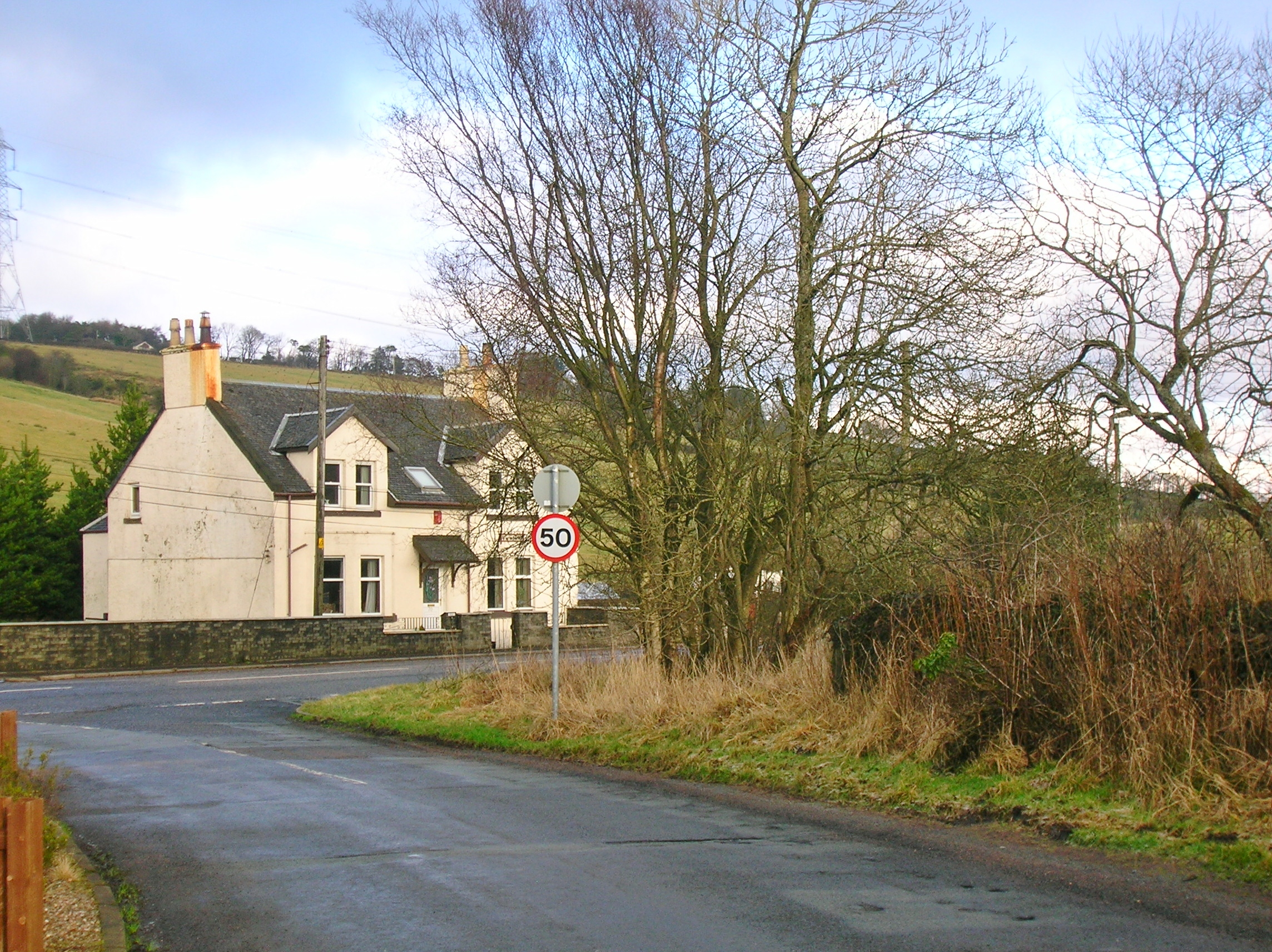
Crossroads and site of old toll house.

Shillford Garage was a business located on Lochlibo Road.

The unusual name 'Banklug' given to the nearby farm may refer to its being on the bank or 'lug' of the Thorter Burn.

The old Cowdon Mill was located nearby on the Cowdon Burn.

== See also ==
- Caldwell, East Renfrewshire
- Cowden Hall, East Renfrewshire
