= Loch Libo =

Coordinates: 55°46′8.3″N 4°29′45.9″W

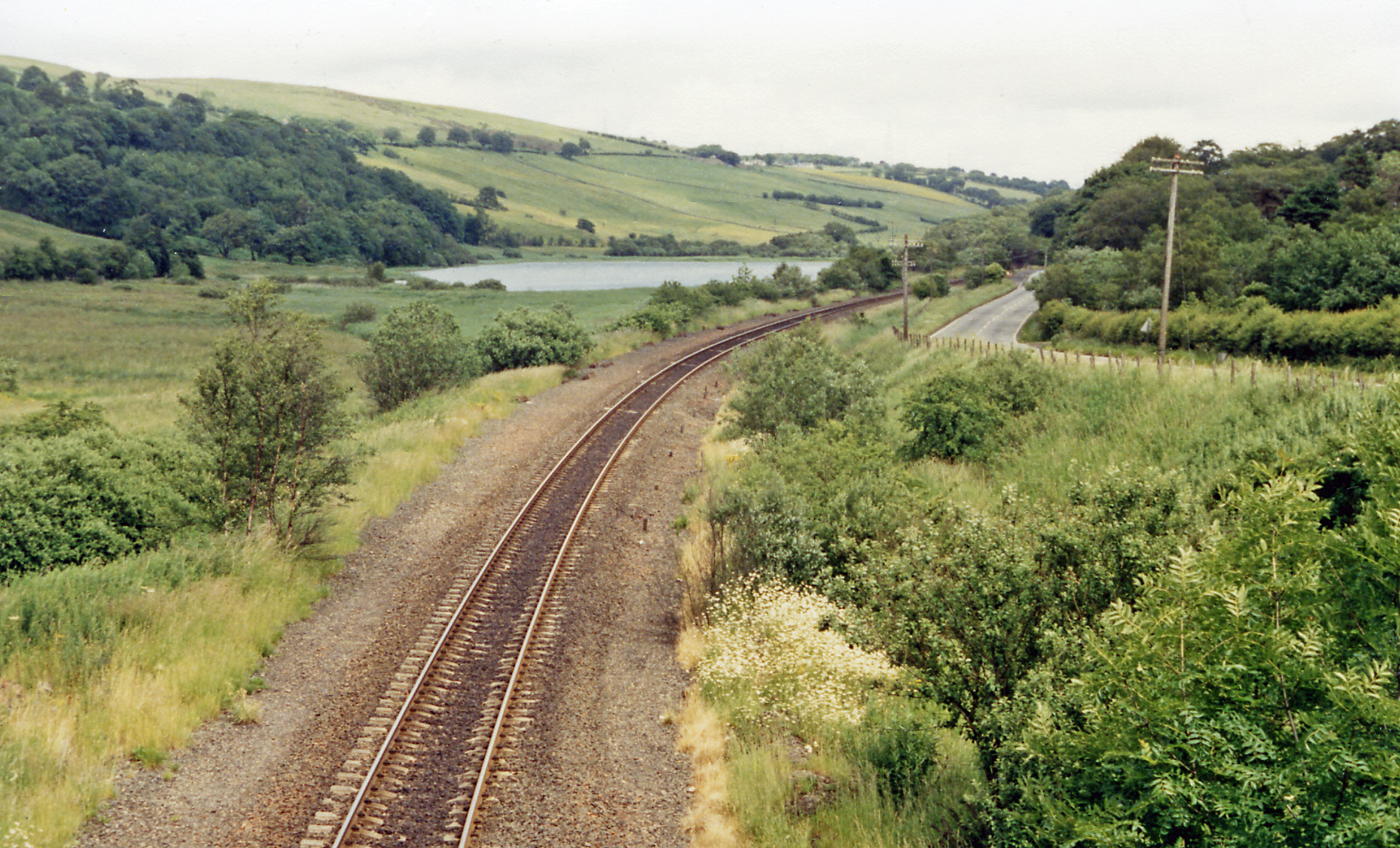
- Loch Libo and the railway to Glasgow

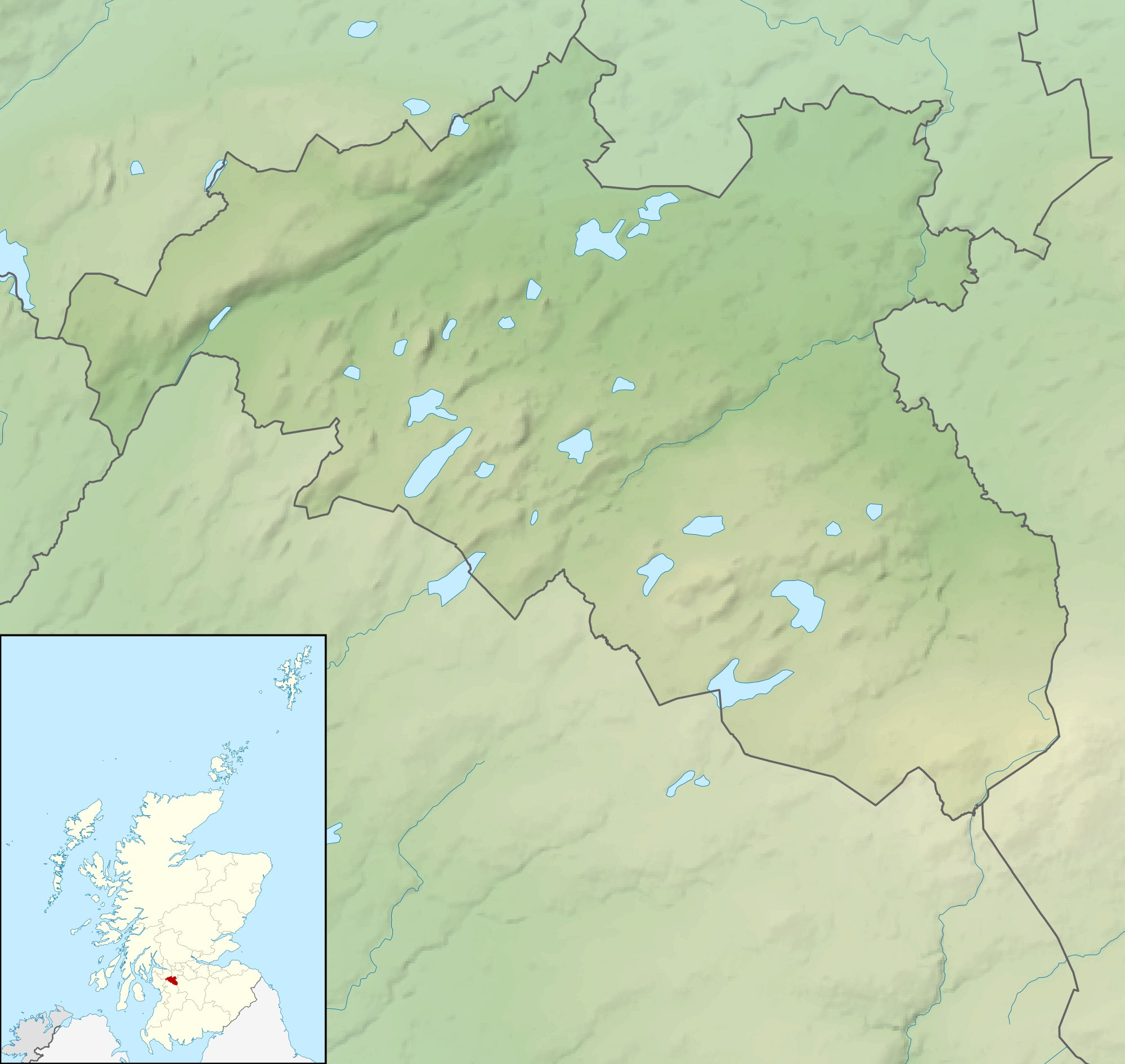
- Location within East Renfrewshire
- Location: Uplawmoor, East Renfrewshire, Scotland
- Lake type: Old freshwater loch
- Primary inflows: Thorter Burn, rainfall and natural drainage
- Primary outflows: Lugton Water
- Basin countries: Scotland
- Surface area: 24 acres (9.7 ha)
- Average depth: Shallow
- Surface elevation: 395 ft (120 m)
- Islands: None
- Settlements: Neilston

Loch Libo is a freshwater loch in East Renfrewshire, Parish of Neilston, Scotland. The Lugton Water has its source from the southern end of loch, running 14 miles before reaching its confluence with the River Garnock near Kilwinning. The village of Uplawmoor and the hamlet of Shillford lie nearby. 3 mi (4.8 km) away to the northeast is the town of Neilston.

== History ==
The name is of great antiquity and 'Libo' may be pre-Gaelic in origin. The loch lies in a glen, with Caldwell Law to the north and Uplawmoor Wood to the south. In the 14th century was referred to as 'Loch le Bog Syde' in a charter, meaning the 'Bogside Loch'. The loch is now owned by the Scottish Wildlife Trust (SWT) and is managed as a nature reserve.

== Usage ==
=== Transport ===
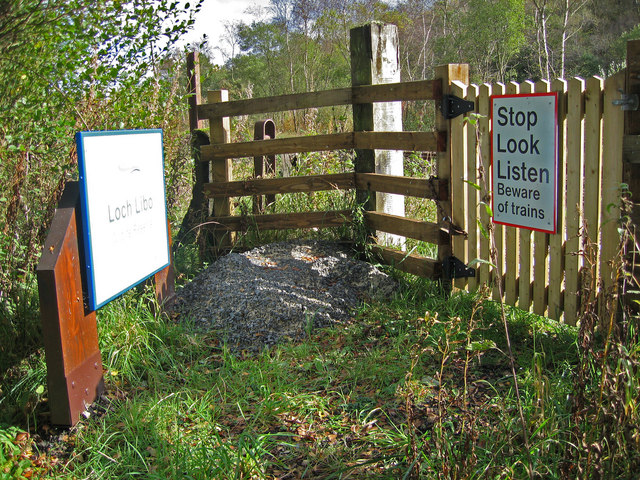
Pedestrian crossing over the railway

The old turnpike, now the A736 Lochlibo Road (locally known as the 'Low Road'), ran for about a mile along the southern margin of the loch, later joined by the Glasgow, Barrhead and Kilmarnock Joint Railway that stands even closer to the loch's waters. Caldwell railway station, later renamed Uplawmoor was situated close by and was convenient for visitors, such as curlers, who used the loch. The station closed in 1966, the railway remaining open, although the track has been singled; pedestrians cross the line to access the loch at a dedicated railway crossing with trains passing every fifteen minutes on weekdays (datum 2012).

=== Angling ===
Loch Libo's waters are recorded to hold tench, eels, perch, pike, carp, and roach (braise in Scots); it is however the fishing preserve of the Scottish Carp Group members as is advertised by signs erected at the loch shore. The 1895 OS map shows a boat house on the northern side near where a burn feeds into the loch.

=== Curling ===
Curling matches began at Loch Libo in 1885 when a Curling-stone house was built. The club cancelled all matches ‘during the current emergency’ from 1915 to 1919 where the minutes also record that there were insufficient members to form a quorum at the AGM during these war years. In 1919 The club moved to Kirkton Dam and arrangements were put in hand to relocate the Curling-stone house from Loch Libo. The loch and its back drop The Neilston Pad form the Club Badge worn on Neilston CC sports wear, in the club colours of dark blue, light blue and white.

The Neilston Curling Club members enjoyed concessions granted by the Glasgow, Barrhead and Kilmarnock Joint Railway Company for members and their curling stones to travel between Neilston and Caldwell stations and return for the cost of the single journey. A key for the clubhouse was also kept at the then Caldwell station.

== Cartographic evidence ==
The loch is roughly oval in shape, generally shallow, but of considerable depth in the centre. Timothy Pont's map of circa 1601 records 'Loch Libo' with the present spelling, as does the 1654 map of Blaeu. John Ainslie's map renders the name as 'Loch Lebe'. The OS maps show a boat house until 1969.

Location of Loch Libo, East Renfrewshire

== Hydrology ==
The Lugton Water has its origins at the south-west end of the loch and the Thorter Burn was diverted to run into the loch following the construction of the Glasgow, Barrhead and Kilmarnock Joint Railway. The Caldwell Law Burn runs into the loch on the northern side. A burn runs into the loch from Shillford and this is in addition to rainfall and drainage.

== Coal mining ==
A coal seam dips down under the southern margin of the loch and a mine was dug in the 1780s. In 1793 the waters of the loch burst into the workings and at least six miners were drowned, their bodies never being recovered. A servant collecting coal was also drowned, having wandered into the pit out of curiosity. Several attempts were made to drain and re-open the mine, to no avail, however it was reopened around 1830 as the Loch Coal Co. with much deeper shafts and two seams being exploited, one Ell Coal and the other Craw Coal; both seams were about four feet thick. These workings were worked out many years ago.

It was reported in The Scotsman, on 23 September 1843 that the original pit had been sealed and the water pumped out, exposing a skeleton of what may have been a young man, along with a pair of shoes and some buttons. The skeleton was subsequently buried at the Neilston Church cemetery.

== Sand quarry ==
The 1895 and later map shows a large sand quarry off the lane leading to Westhead of Side Farm.

== Natural history ==
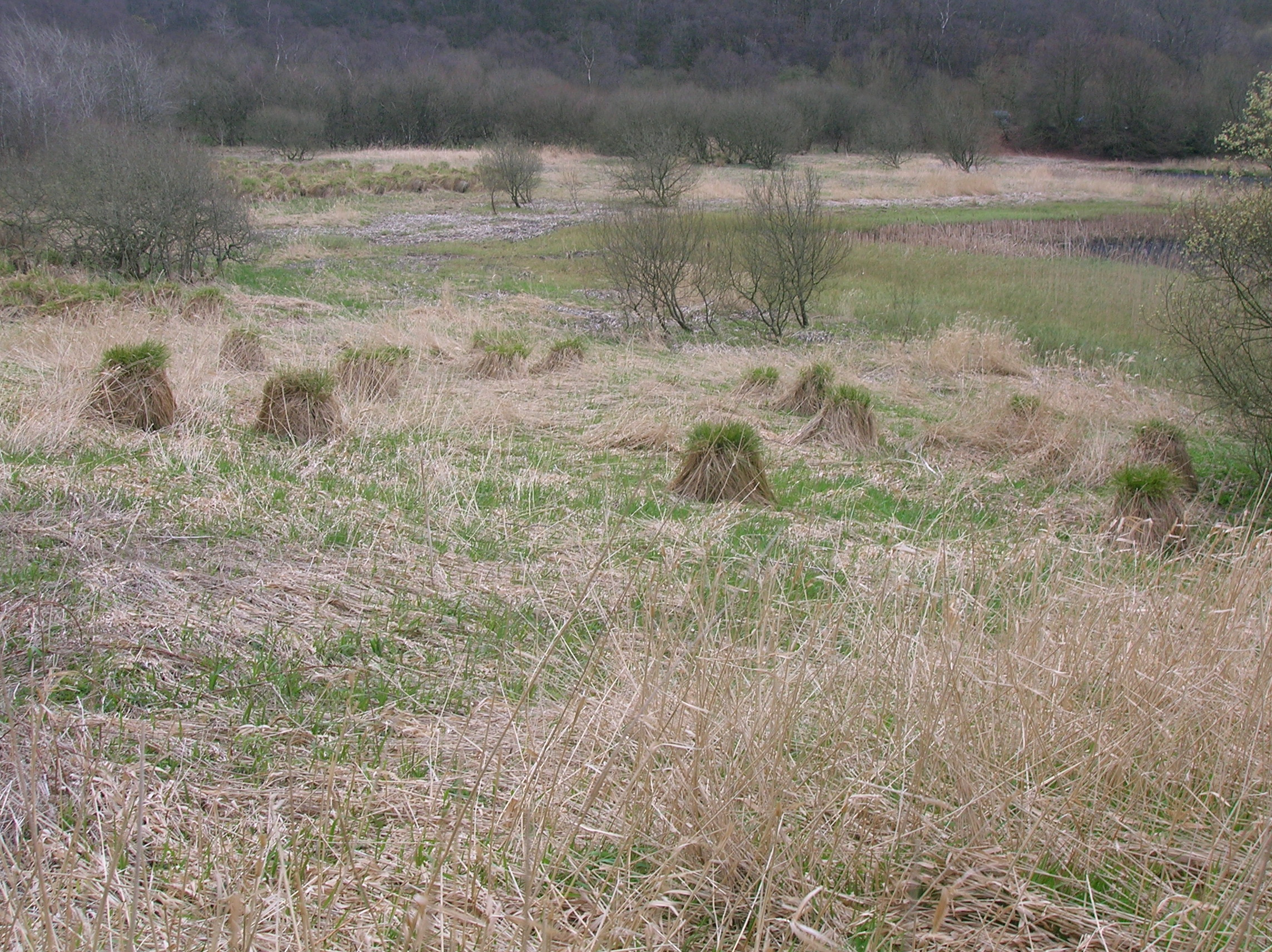
Great tussock sedge at the eastern end of the loch.

The loch and part of Caldwell-Lawside Wood have been a Site of Scientific Interest (SSSI) since 1972, covering 17.82 ha as designated by Scottish Natural Heritage (SNH) and a Scottish Wildlife Trust (SWT) wildlife site. The loch is owned by the SWT.

Loch Libo is the best example of a eutrophic in East Renfrewshire with aquatic and emergent vegetation. Significant plants include the Nationally Scarce cowbane Cicuta virosa and the locally uncommon greater tussock sedge Carex paniculata and lesser pond sedge Carex acutiformis. The nationally uncommon species lesser tussock sedge Carex diandra, water sedge Carex aquatilis, slender tufted sedge Carex acuta and water parsnip Berula erecta are also present.

Birds recorded at the site include: jack snipe, common snipe, grey heron, whooper swan, mute swan, teal, wigeon, goldeneye, tufted duck, mallard, coot, moorhen, buzzard, wren, coal tit, great tit, blue tit, long-tailed tit, treecreeper, great spotted woodpecker, song thrush, blackbird, robin, dunnock, chaffinch, jackdaw, carrion crow, sparrowhawk, water rail, redshank, pheasant, owls, grasshopper warbler and reed bunting. Other animals are bats, deer, mice, otters, common frog, common toad, smooth and palmate newts and water vole.

== Micro-history ==
A geocache is located in the Caldwell-Lawside Wood.

By 1895 'targets' are marked below the Caldwell-Lawside Woods at the western end of the loch.
