= Eglinton station (disambiguation) =

Eglinton station is a subway station in Toronto, Canada.

Eglinton station may also refer to:

- Eglinton GO Station, a commuter rail station in Toronto, Canada
- Eglinton railway station (Northern Ireland), a closed station in County Londonderry, Northern Ireland
- Eglinton railway station, Perth, a station in Australia
- Eglinton Street railway station, a closed station in Glasgow, Scotland
- Cedarvale station, formerly named Eglinton West, a subway station in Toronto, Canada
- Cumberland Street railway station, Glasgow, Scotland, originally called Eglinton Street
- RAF Eglinton, a former Royal Air Force air base in Derry, Northern Ireland
- RNAS Eglinton, a former Royal Naval Air Station in Derry, Northern Ireland

== See also ==
- Eglinton (disambiguation)
