= Lugton Water =

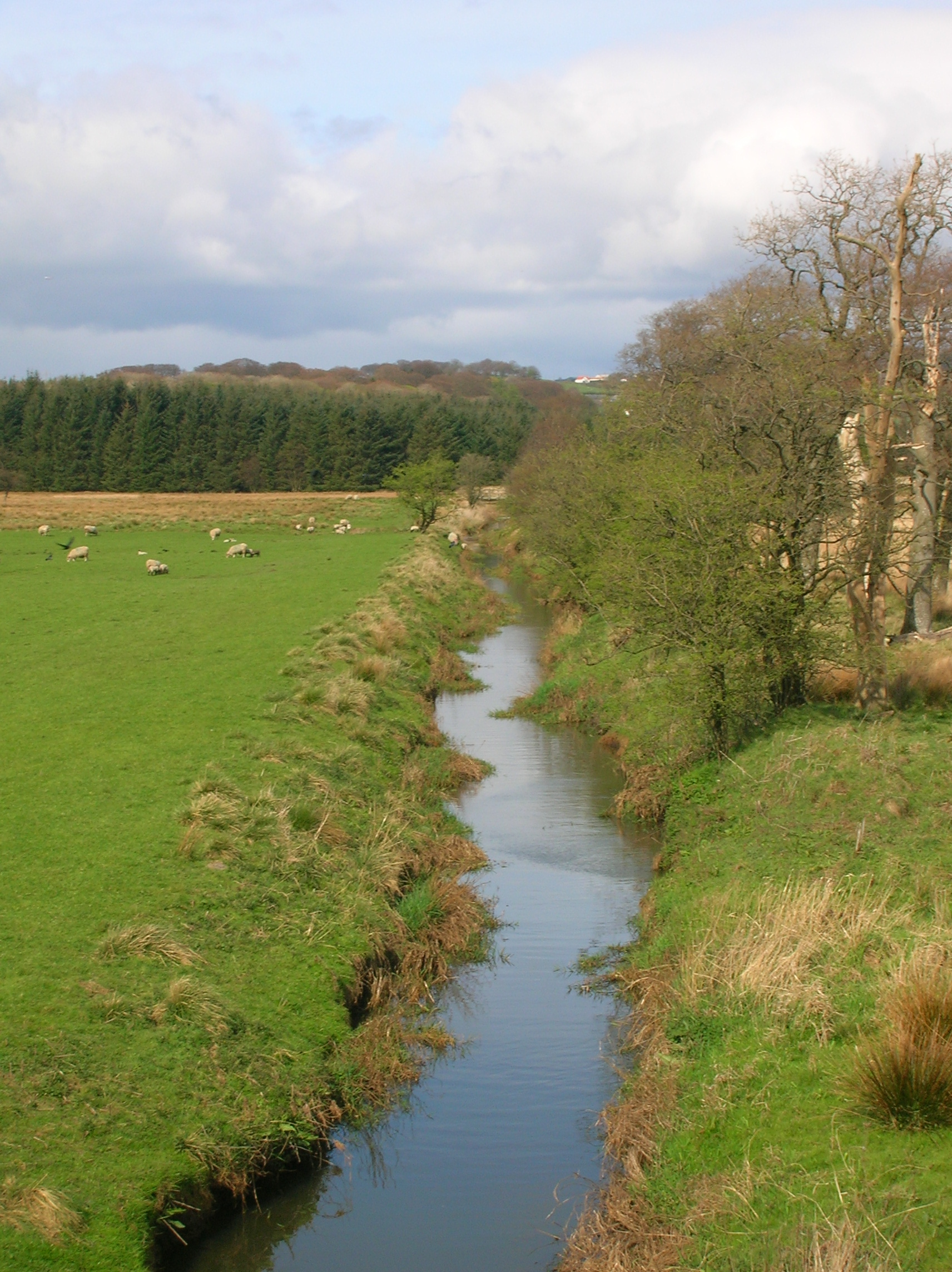
- Lugton Water looking towards Caldwell

Location
- Country: Scotland
- Region: East Renfrewshire, North Ayrshire

Physical characteristics
- Source: Loch Libo
  - location: Uplawmoor, East Renfrewshire
  - elevation: 395 ft (120 m)
- Mouth: River Garnock
  - location: Kilwinning, North Ayrshire
- Length: 14 mi (23 km)

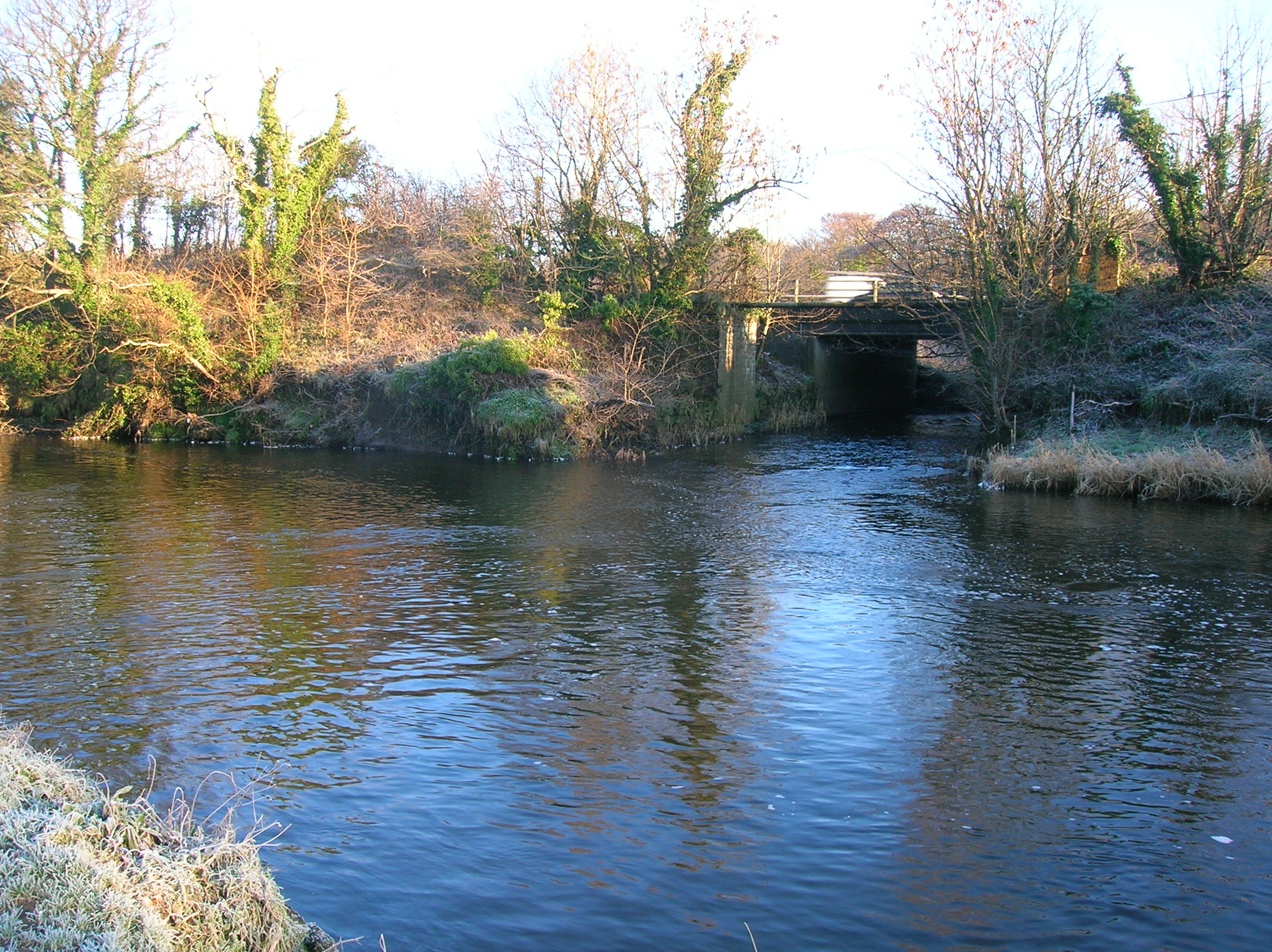
The confluence of the Lugton Water and the River Garnock.

The Lugton Water, the largest tributary of the River Garnock, runs 14 miles (23 km) from Loch Libo (395 feet above sea-level) in Uplawmoor, through Lugton and the parishes of Neilston, Beith, Dunlop, Stewarton and Kilwinning. The Lugton joins the Garnock below the tidal limit, shortly after passing through Eglinton Country Park, developed around the ancient estate of the Earl of Eglinton.

Timothy Pont refers to it as the 'Ludgar' or 'Lugdurr'. Loch Libo in the 14th century was referred to as Loch le Bog Syde in a charter, meaning the Bogside Loch.

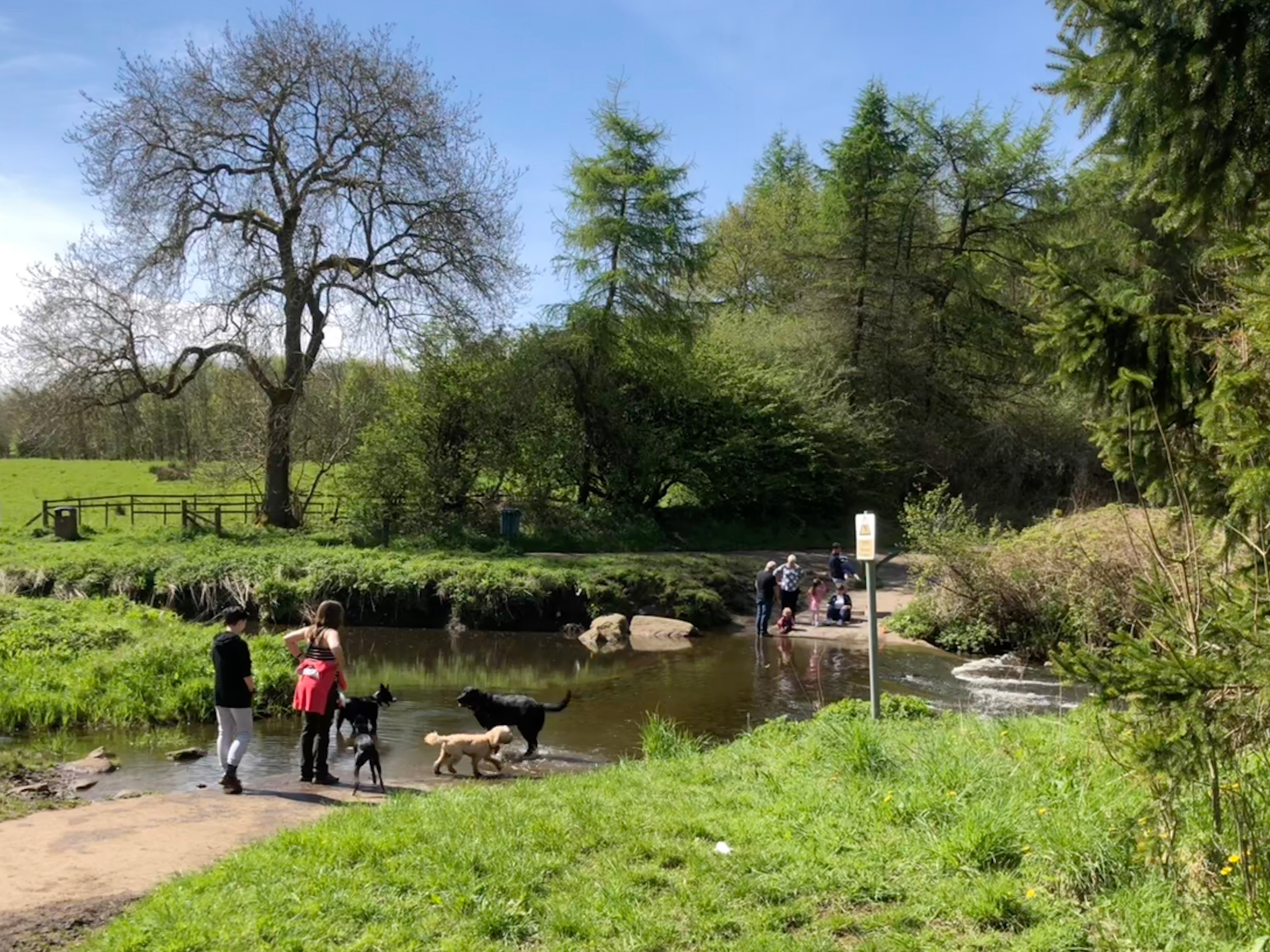
Eglinton Park ford and weir

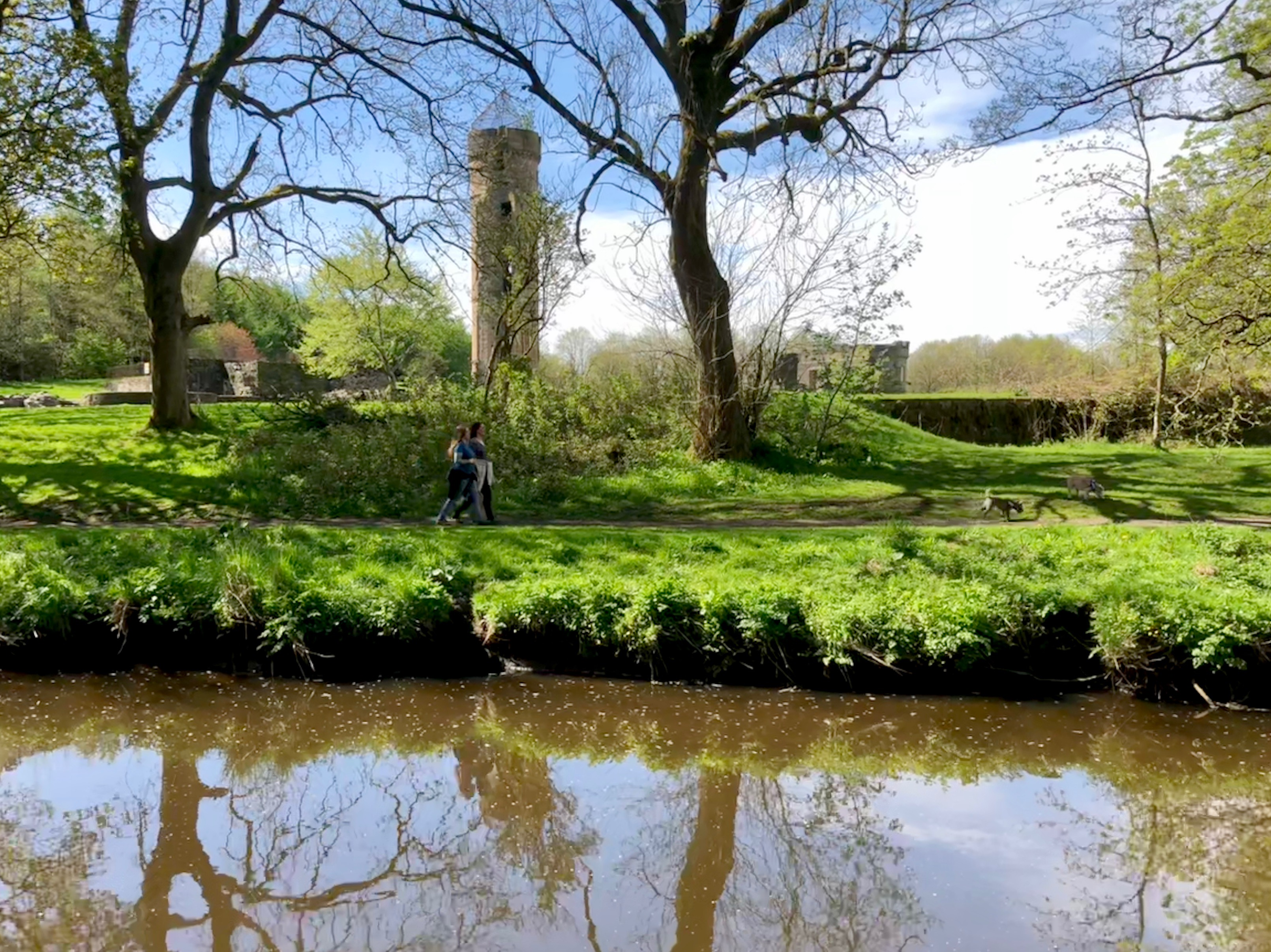
Ruins of Eglinton Castle seen across the Lugton Water

The course through Eglinton Park has been greatly through the construction of several weirs, canalisation, 'loops' infilled, small lochs removed, etc.

The Duniflat Burn joins the Lugton Water from the East Ayrshire side close to the North Biggart bridge near where the Bells Burn from Bells Bog on the East Renfrewshire side also has its confluence.

The Bungle Burn, an outflow of the Blae Loch, joins the Lugton Water near the Bungleburn Bridge outside the village of Burnhouse.

The river runs past Eglinton Loch within Eglinton Country Park and at times of heavy flood its waters enter the loch.

It contains fresh-water and sea-trout and the occasional salmon.
