= Uplawmoor =

Coordinates: 55.765°N 4.496°W

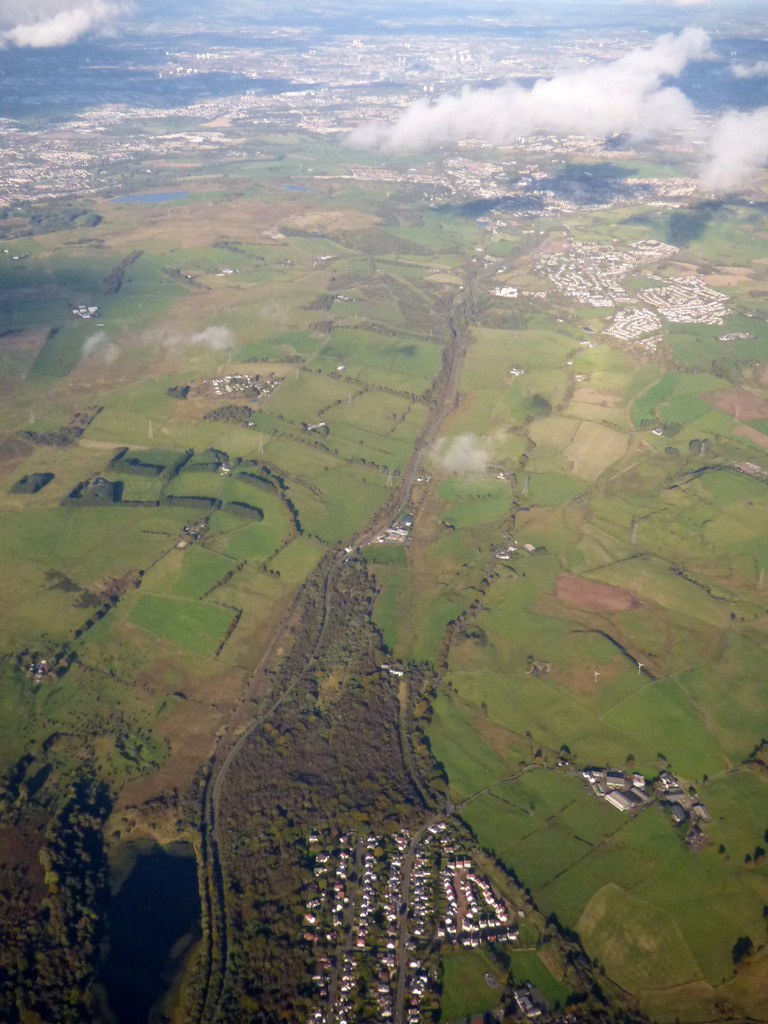
- Loch Libo and Uplawmoor from the air

- Location within East Renfrewshire
- Population: 690 (2020)
- OS grid reference: NS434552
- Council area: East Renfrewshire
- Lieutenancy area: Renfrewshire
- Country: Scotland
- Sovereign state: United Kingdom
- Post town: GLASGOW
- Postcode district: G78
- Dialling code: 01505
- Police: Scotland
- Fire: Scottish
- Ambulance: Scottish
- UK Parliament: East Renfrewshire
- Scottish Parliament: Renfrewshire West and Levern Valley

Uplawmoor (Scots pronunciation: [ˈʌpɫəmuːr]) is a village in East Renfrewshire, Scotland. Its population was 700 as of 2016.

Historic Uplawmoor, associated for centuries with the Barony of Caldwell and the Mure family, is still a vibrant community today, although bereft of the shops once to be found there. It has a primary school, hotel (Uplawmoor Hotel), village hall (Mure Hall), sports ground for tennis and football (including a playpark) and a golf club (Caldwell Golf Club). Nearby is the extensive Caldwell Estate with the roofless 18th century Caldwell House, which was designed by Robert Adam. The separate Caldwell Tower, of probable 16th century origin, is visible from the village. Several farms surround the village, as agriculture has always been of importance locally.

Historically the village was served by two railway lines – Lanarkshire and Ayrshire and Glasgow, Barrhead and Kilmarnock Joint Railway

Uplawmoor has a rural setting, with farmland on one side and mainly beech woodland (Pollick Glen and Shillford Woods, with numerous paths) on the other. Below lies the valley where are the A736 and Loch Libo, a Scottish Wildlife Trust Site Of Special Scientific Interest, the winter home of flocks of whooper swans. At the end of the loch is an area of large tussock sedges and on the far side is a striking waterfall among more woodland. The old hamlet of Shillford lies towards Neilston on the A736.

== Transport ==
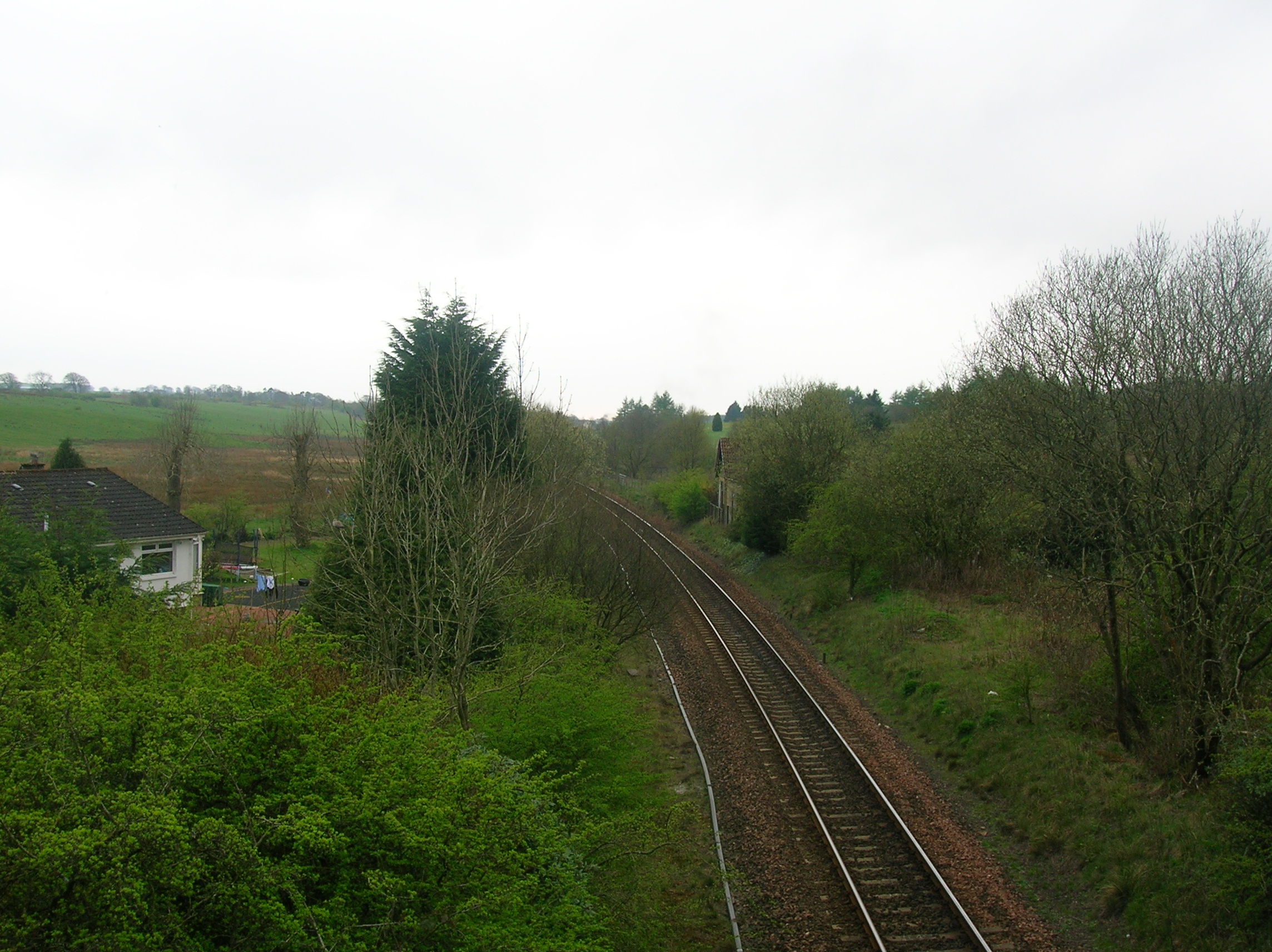
Caldwell / Uplawmoor Station site in 2007. looking towards Lugton. Part of the main station building is on the right.

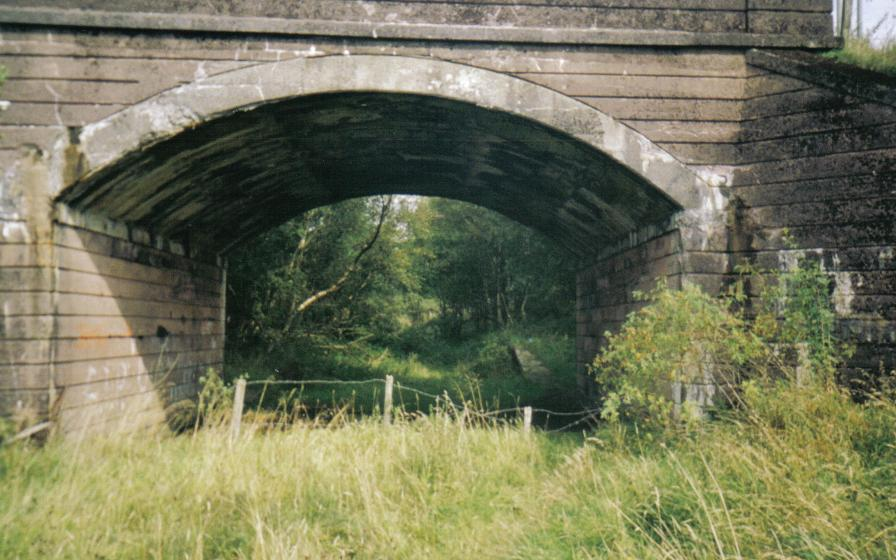
A view of the old station on the Ardrossan to Glasgow line. The railway still operates from Neilston to Glasgow.

Caldwell station opened on 27 March 1871. The station was renamed Uplawmoor after the closure of the Uplawmoor station on the Lanarkshire and Ayrshire Railway on 2 April 1962. The station closed permanently on 7 November 1966. A number of local campaigns to re-open the station have so far been unsuccessful. It has now become overgrown and only a platform remains to show that Uplawmoor actually had a railway line.

== See also ==
- Cowden Hall
- Caldwell
