= Neilston Low railway station =

Former railway station in Scotland

Coordinates: 55.7862°N 4.4393°W

Neilston Low

General information
- Location: Neilston, Renfrewshire; Scotland
- Platforms: 2

Other information
- Status: Disused

History
- Original company: Glasgow, Barrhead and Neilston Direct Railway
- Pre-grouping: Caledonian and Glasgow & South Western Railways

Key dates
- 5 October 1855: Opened as Crofthead
- 1 June 1868: Renamed Neilston
- 1 May 1870: Closed
- 27 March 1871: Reopened by GB&K
- 24 January 1953: Renamed Neilson Low
- 7 November 1966: Closed
Location

Neilston Low railway station was a railway station serving the town of Neilston, East Renfrewshire, Scotland. The station was originally part of the Glasgow, Barrhead and Neilston Direct Railway (GB&N).

== History ==
The station opened by the Glasgow, Barrhead and Neilston Direct Railway, on 5 October 1855, as Crofthead. It was renamed Neilston on 1 June 1868; however it closed shortly after, on 1 May 1870.

The station reopened on 27 March 1871 and became part of the Glasgow, Barrhead and Kilmarnock Joint Railway (GB&K). It was renamed Neilston Low on 24 January 1953 and closed permanently on 7 November 1966.

Today the line is still open as part of the Glasgow South Western Line, although the station is long gone.

== See also ==
- Neilston railway station, on the former Lanarkshire and Ayrshire Railway

Preceding station	Historical railways	Following station
Uplawmoor; Line open; station closed	Caledonian and Glasgow & South Western Railways; Glasgow, Barrhead and Kilmarnock Joint Railway	Barrhead
