= Richard Eglington =

English cricketer

Personal information
- Full name: Richard Eglington
- Born: 1 April 1908; Esher, Surrey, England
- Died: 20 March 1979 (aged 70); Winchester, Hampshire, England
- Batting: Right-handed

Domestic team information
- Years: Team
- 1939: Minor Counties
- 1938: Surrey

Career statistics
Competition	First-class
Matches	3
Runs scored	82
Batting average	20.50
100s/50s	–/–
Top score	34
Balls bowled	–
Wickets	–
Bowling average	–
5 wickets in innings	–
10 wickets in match	–
Best bowling	–
Catches/stumpings	1/–
- Source: Cricinfo, 12 August 2012

Richard "Sam" Eglington (1 April 1908 – 20 March 1979) was an English cricketer. Eglington was a right-handed batsman. He was born at Esher, Surrey, and was educated at Sherborne School.

Eglington first represented the Surrey Second XI in the 1927 Minor Counties Championship, making two appearances against the Kent Second XI and Buckinghamshire. He next appeared for the Surrey Second XI in the 1938 Minor Counties Championship, in the same season in which he made his first-class debut for Surrey against Derbyshire at Queen's Park, Chesterfield, in the County Championship. He made a second first-class appearance for the county in that same season against Cambridge University at The Oval. He didn't feature for Surrey in 1939, instead playing for the county's Second XI in the Minor Counties Championship, which allowed him to be selected for a combined Minor Counties cricket team, making a single first-class appearance for the team in 1939 against the touring West Indians at Lord's. In a match which was drawn, he scored 23 runs in the Minor Counties only innings, before being dismissed by Learie Constantine.

He died at Winchester, Hampshire, on 20 March 1979.
