= Eglinton Loch =

Loch in Ayrshire, Scotland

Coordinates: 55°38′43.0″N 4°39′36.0″W

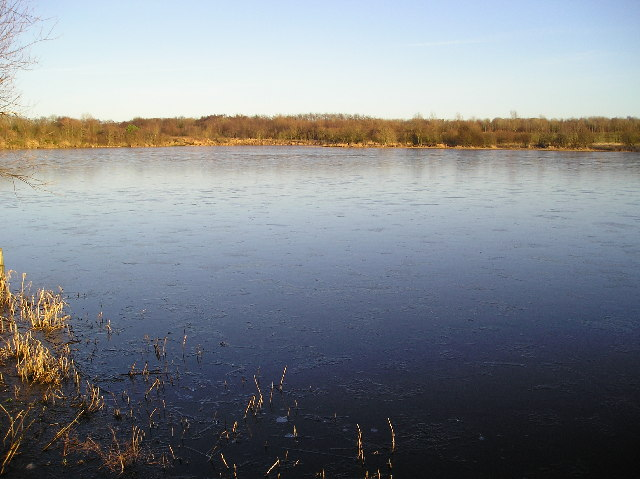
- The loch from the outflow boardwalk area

- The location of Eglinton Loch, North Ayrshire
- Location: Kilwinning, North Ayrshire, Scotland
- Type: Freshwater loch
- Primary inflows: Lugton Water (during floods), rainwater and field drainage
- Primary outflows: Eglinton Burn running to the Lugton Water
- Basin countries: Scotland
- Surface area: 6.5 ha (16 acres)
- Average depth: 6 m (20 ft)
- Islands: 3
- Settlements: Kilwinning

Eglinton Loch (NS 232698 642303) is a small freshwater loch in the North Ayrshire Council Areas (KA12 8TA), lying in a holm of the Lugton Water near Irvine and Kilwinning, within Eglinton Country Park, in the parish of Kilwinning. The loch has 3 small islands within it and is one of a number of Ayrshire's artificial lochs, created by mineral excavation.

== The loch ==
The 6.5 ha loch, 6 metres deep, was created in 1975 through the extraction of materials used in the construction of the A 78 (T) Irvine and Kilwinning bypass. It is marked on old maps as being an area liable to flooding and was the site of the jousting matches at the 1839 Eglinton Tournament. It is not very well stocked with coarse fish anymore, and is no longer as popular for angling as it once was but remains a popular spot for bird watchers. The Lugton Water runs through the park and several weirs were built at intervals along the river to raise the water level for ornamental reasons.

== The Eglinton Tournament ==
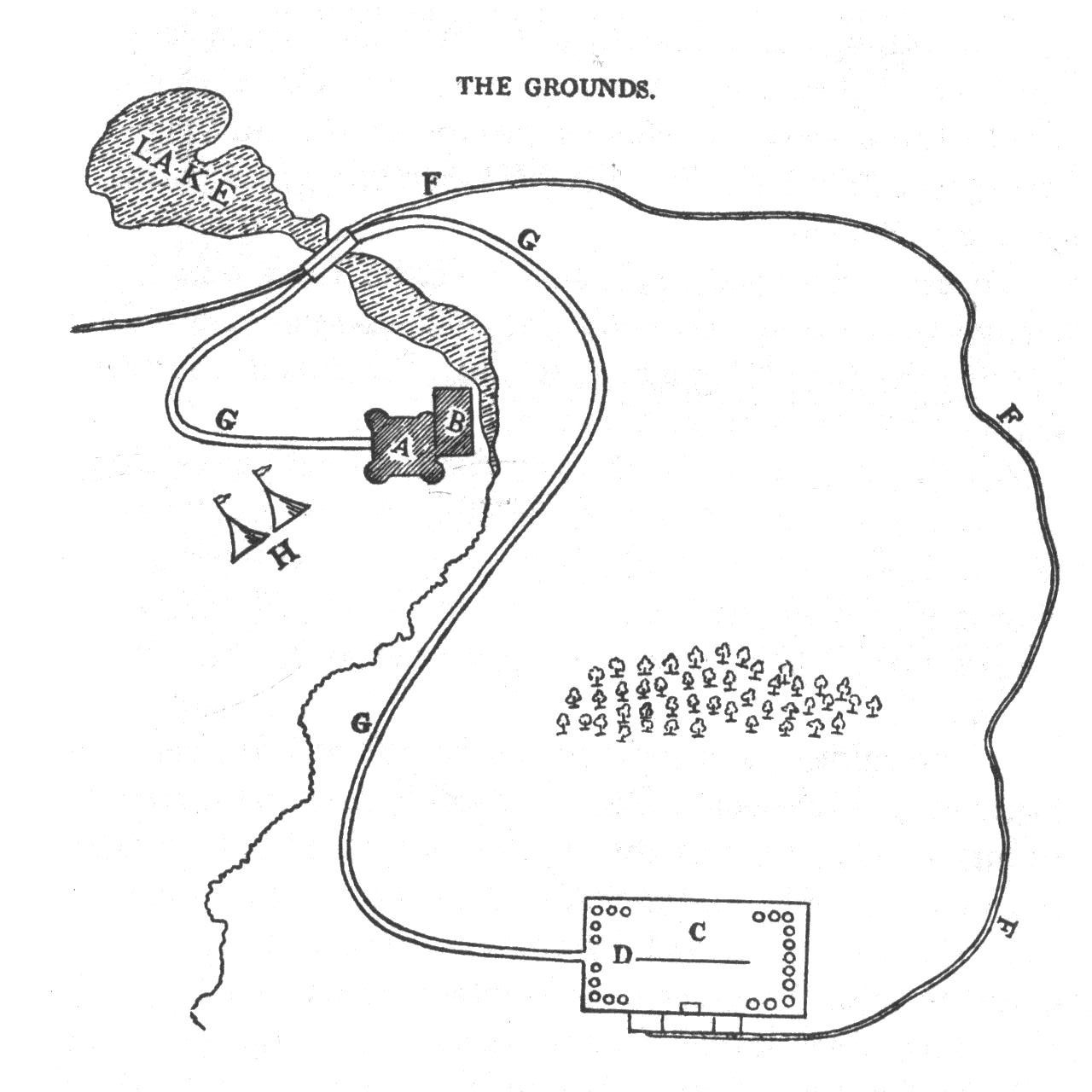
The layout of the various features associated with the Eglinton Tournament on what is now Eglinton Loch. Note the lakes either side of the bridge, formed around 1800.

The ground chosen for the Eglinton Tournament of 1839 was low, almost marshy pasture used as rough grazing, with grassy slopes rising on all sides. The Knights on horseback and their retinue reached the tilt yard ('C' on the map) via an enclosed ride ('G' on the map), whilst the guests and visitors made their way to the stands via the route marked 'F' on the map illustrated. Both groups crossed over the three arched Gothic Eglinton Tournament Bridge. An 1837 map of Eglinton Castle, Grounds and Tilt yard shows that the tilt yard was already in existence at this early date, but it is not recorded what its fate was after the tournament was over.

== Uses ==
The loch is popular with anglers and contains bream, roach, rudd, perch and pike. Catches of carp and tench have been reported on occasion, as have brown trout, washed in during floods.

== Natural history ==
Whooper swans and many other waterfowl use the site. Roe deer use the surrounding scrub area and water lilies are a feature of the western end of the loch. Mute swans, heron, tufted duck, great crested grebe, and kingfisher are also present. Feeding and breeding in the surrounding wetland scrub are a variety of finches and even reed warblers, a notable species on the red data list. Meadow Brown butterflies are seen here as well as Common Blue Damselflies in the water vegetation at the west end of the loch with Common Hawker and Large Red Damselflies in drier habitat at the east end.

Extensive sections of boardwalks provide good access to the loch shores and informal paths run into areas of the wetland scrub; however the latter are closed during the breeding season.

== See also ==
- Kilwinning
- Irvine
- Eglinton Castle
