= Niaqurnaaluk =

Peninsula in Nunavut, Canada

Coordinates: 70°47′11″N 069°26′30″W

Niaqurnaaluk (Inuktitut syllabics: ᓂᐊᖁᕐᓈᓗᒃ formerly Cape Eglinton (sometimes written as Nahanausaq) is a land point on eastern Baffin Island, in the Qikiqtaaluk Region, Nunavut, Canada. It was previously named by Sir John Ross in honour of the Earl of Eglinton.
