= Caldwell railway station =

Disused railway station in Scotland

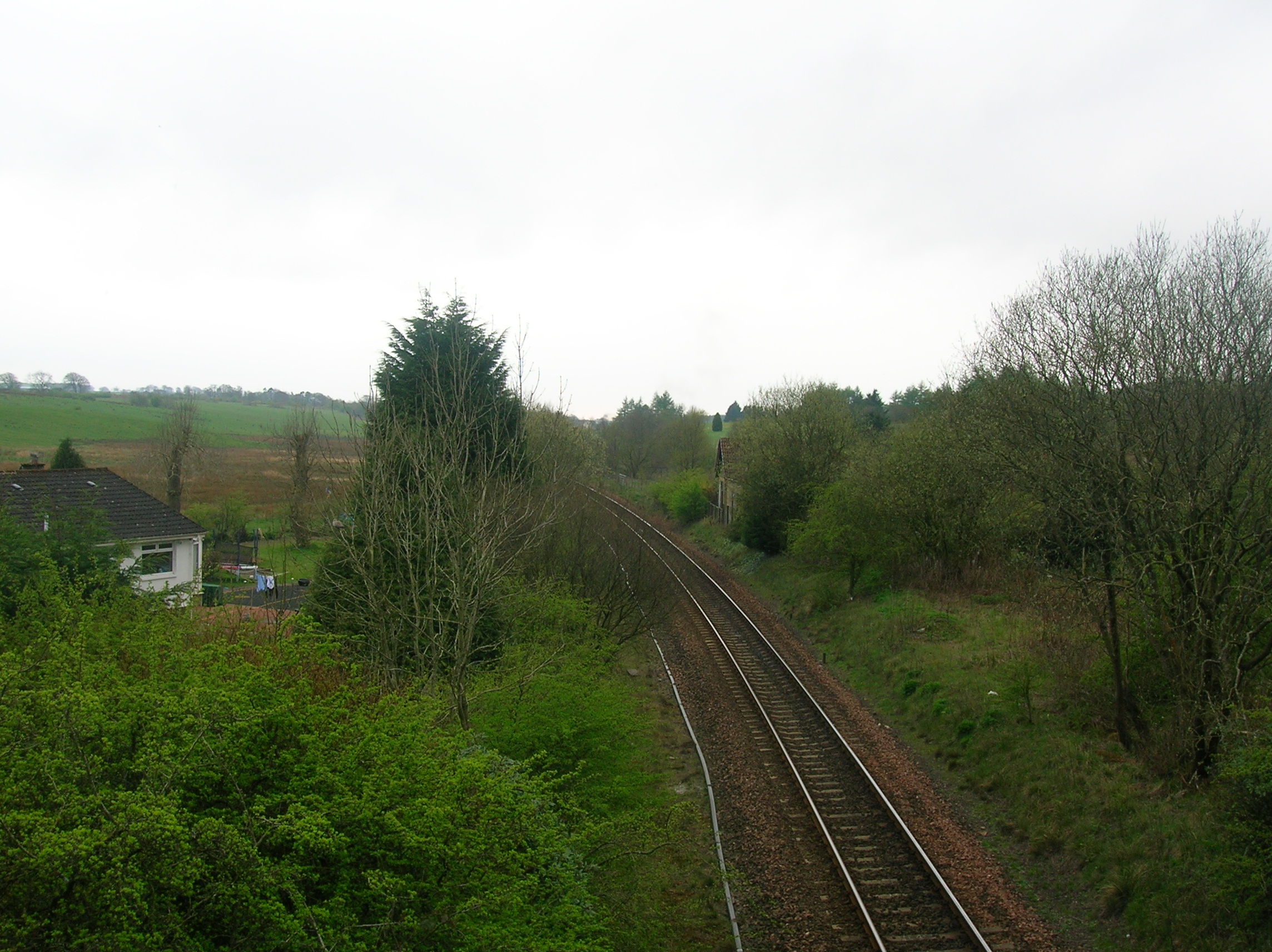
- The site of the station in 2007. Station building is on the distant right.

General information
- Location: Uplawmoor, East Renfrewshire; Scotland
- Coordinates: 55.7636°N 4.5054°W
- Grid reference: NS428550
- Platforms: 2

Other information
- Status: Disused

History
- Original company: Glasgow, Barrhead and Kilmarnock Joint Railway
- Pre-grouping: Caledonian and Glasgow & South Western Railways

Key dates
- 27 March 1871: Opened as Caldwell
- 2 April 1962: Renamed Uplawmoor
- 7 November 1966: Closed to passengers
Location

Caldwell railway station was a railway station near the village of Uplawmoor, East Renfrewshire, Scotland. The station was originally part of the Glasgow, Barrhead and Kilmarnock Joint Railway. The station was renamed to Uplawmoor railway station in 1962, four years prior to its closure.

== History ==
The station opened on 27 March 1871 as Caldwell. The station spent most of its existence as this name, and was only renamed to Uplawmoor upon the closure of the station with the same name on the Lanarkshire and Ayrshire Railway on 2 April 1962. The station closed permanently on 7 November 1966.

The Neilston Curling Club members enjoyed concessions granted by the Glasgow, Barrhead and Kilmarnock Joint Railway Company for members and their curling stones to travel between Neilston and Caldwell stations and return for the cost of the single journey. A key for the club's Curling house was also kept at the then Caldwell station.

In 1966 the station was temporarily renamed 'Tannochbrae' for an episode of Dr. Finlay's Casebook. BR Class J36 0-6-0 steam locomotive No. 65345 was repainted at Thornton m.p.d. for use in the filming.

Today the line is still open as part of the Glasgow South Western Line, with the original station building still standing as a private residence. Many local campaigns to re-open the station have come and gone without success.

Preceding station	Historical railways	Following station
Lugton; Line open; station closed	Caledonian and Glasgow & South Western Railways; Glasgow, Barrhead and Kilmarnock Joint Railway	Neilston Low; Line open; station closed
