= Cowden Hall, East Renfrewshire =

Cowden Hall
- Neilston, East Renfrewshire, Scotland; UK grid reference NS4669257162
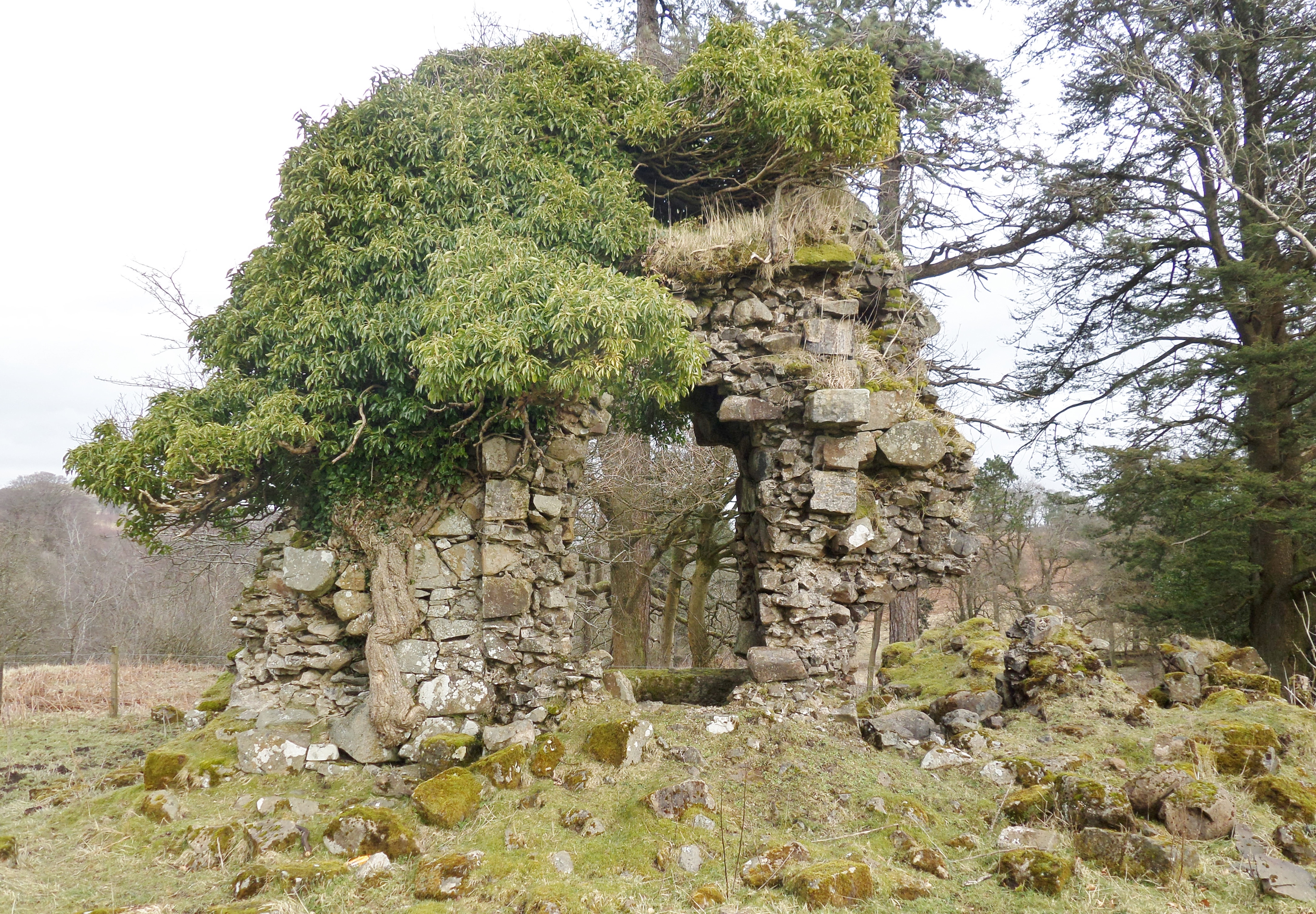
- Remnants of Cowden Hall

Site information
- Type: A hall-house
- Owner: Private
- Open to the public: No
- Condition: Partly demolished and 'robbed'

Location
- Cowden Hall
- Location within Scotland
- Coordinates: 55.783391°N 4.446249°W

Site history
- Built: 17th century
- Built by: The Cochrane Clan
- Materials: Stone

Cowden Hall, Cowdon Hall or Cowdenhall is an example of a laird's hall-house with a farmstead dating from more peaceful times in the seventeenth century when gun loops, thick defensive walls and well defended entrances were no longer essential and larger windows could be utilised. Eighteenth century additions included an outshot with a cruck roof. Cowden is located in an elevated position overlooking the Neilston Gap and the Levern Water on the lands of the old Barony of Cowden near Neilston in East Renfrewshire, Scotland.

== History ==
A building may have stood on or near to the site prior to the seventeenth century as indicated by the name ‘Kouden’ that is recorded on Timothy Pont’s Renfrewshire map that dates from between 1583 and 1596. In 1695 the name 'Couldoune' is recorded on the Poll Tax Roll when Thomas Spreull lived at Smithhills of Couldoune (now Smiddyhill Farm?) with his three children; John Spreull lived here with his wife Margaret Gardiner; James Spreull lived at Knowglass (now Knockglass?) with his wife Margaret Dinsmuir; John Stewart lived at Couldoune Mill; Huw Cochrane lived in Couldoune. The name 'Cowden' may derive from the Gaelic 'Caltuinn' for 'Hazel' and valley.

Although Cowden overlooks the Neilston Gap it was not always the main thoroughfare as Roy's 1750s map shows no track here with the cart track from Irvine to Glasgow running past Glanderston with a branch to Neilston running fairly close to Cowden Hall.

=== Lairds ===
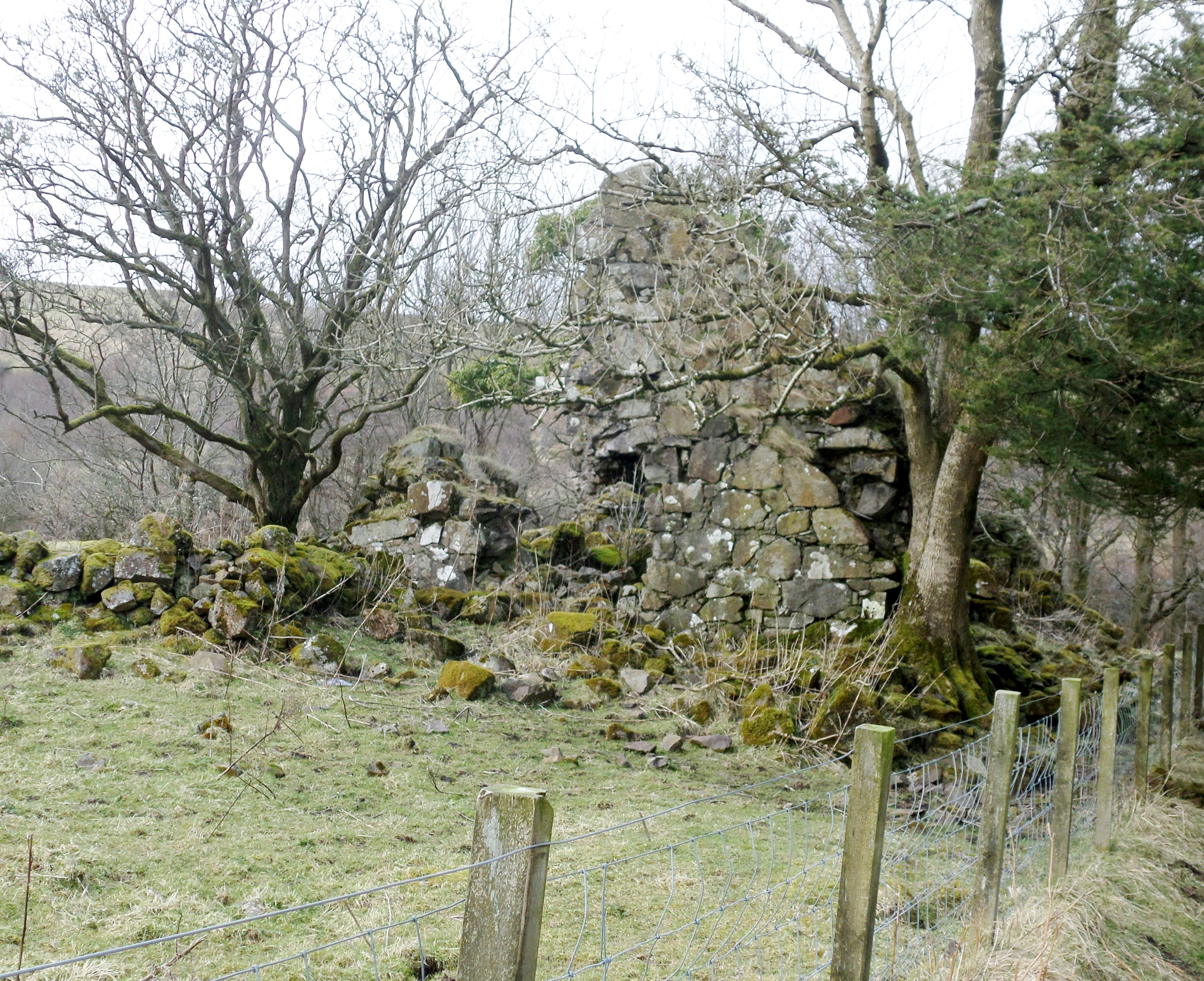
The surviving gable end of the probable 18th century addition.

Sir Robery Croc of Crookston Castle held lands in Neilston in the 12th century and is thought to have held a castle that may have been at Cowden. From the fourteenth century the Spreull or Spreul family of Dalmuir held the barony however in 1622 it was purchased from James Spreull by Alexander Blair who changed his name to Alexander Cochrane of Dundonald in South Ayrshire. Walter Spreull of Cowden was High Steward of Dumbarton and a member of a family who had a long association with the parish of Neilston. He was a retainer of Malcolm, Earl of Lennox in the early fourteenth century at the time of Robert the Bruce. In 1545 Mary Queen of Scots granted the lands of Cowden to Spreulls for good service indicating a short period from 1441 when the family did not hold the barony (however see below).

Robertson records that Walter Spreul passed the lands of 'Coudoun' to his son Thomas in 1441, they then passed to John his son in 1481 and likewise to Robert in 1515. Two John Spreuls followed in succession and the male line ended with James who in 1622 sold the lands as previously recorded. The Spreuls of Miltoun and John Spreul of Glasgow were descendants of the Spreuls of Cowden.

In 1531 the laird of Cowden was involved in a feud with the laird of Colgrane. In 1549 a Thomas Sprewill de Coldon (sic) is recorded.

In 1507 John Spreul, a younger son of the family, became the vicar of Dunlop as well as a professor of philosophy at Glasgow University and then Rector. He went on to become a prebend at Glasgow Cathedral and in 1541 he was a dean, dying in 1555, leaving his property to his nephew John, son of his brother Robert who was a burgess of the Glasgow.

William Cochrane of Cowden was responsible for building the hall whose ruins survive in part with later additions also extant in a ruinous condition. As stated the estate in 1622 was sold to Alexander Blair of that Ilk who married a Cochrane heiress and adopted her name, the family becoming Earls of Dundonald. Eventually Cowden passed to the Marquis of Clydesdale via his mother who was a daughter of the Earl of Dundonald. The marquis, on becoming the Duke of Hamilton, sold the lands to the Mures of Caldwell in 1776 who still held the property in 1910.

Coventry records that the Spreulls held Cowden from 1306 and that they sold the lands to the Blairs, the lands eventually passing to the Mures of Craigends in 1776.

=== Coat of arms ===
The Spreulls of Cowdon occupied lands which controlled the road south to Ayrshire. The armorial bearing of the Spreuls of Coudoun was, "Or; a Chevron Checquie, Azure and Argent; betwixt three Purses, Guiles. This translates as a chevron with a chessboard-like background of blue and silver squares and three red purses spread between all on a gold background.

Saint Matthew was a tax-gatherer and bags on coats of arms often denoted a treasurer or some other linked occupation. The Spreulls may have had a link with collecting tolls from travellers.

The Spreulls of Cowden were related to the Spreulls of Ladymuir, Castlehill and Blachairne.

=== Cowden Hall-house ===
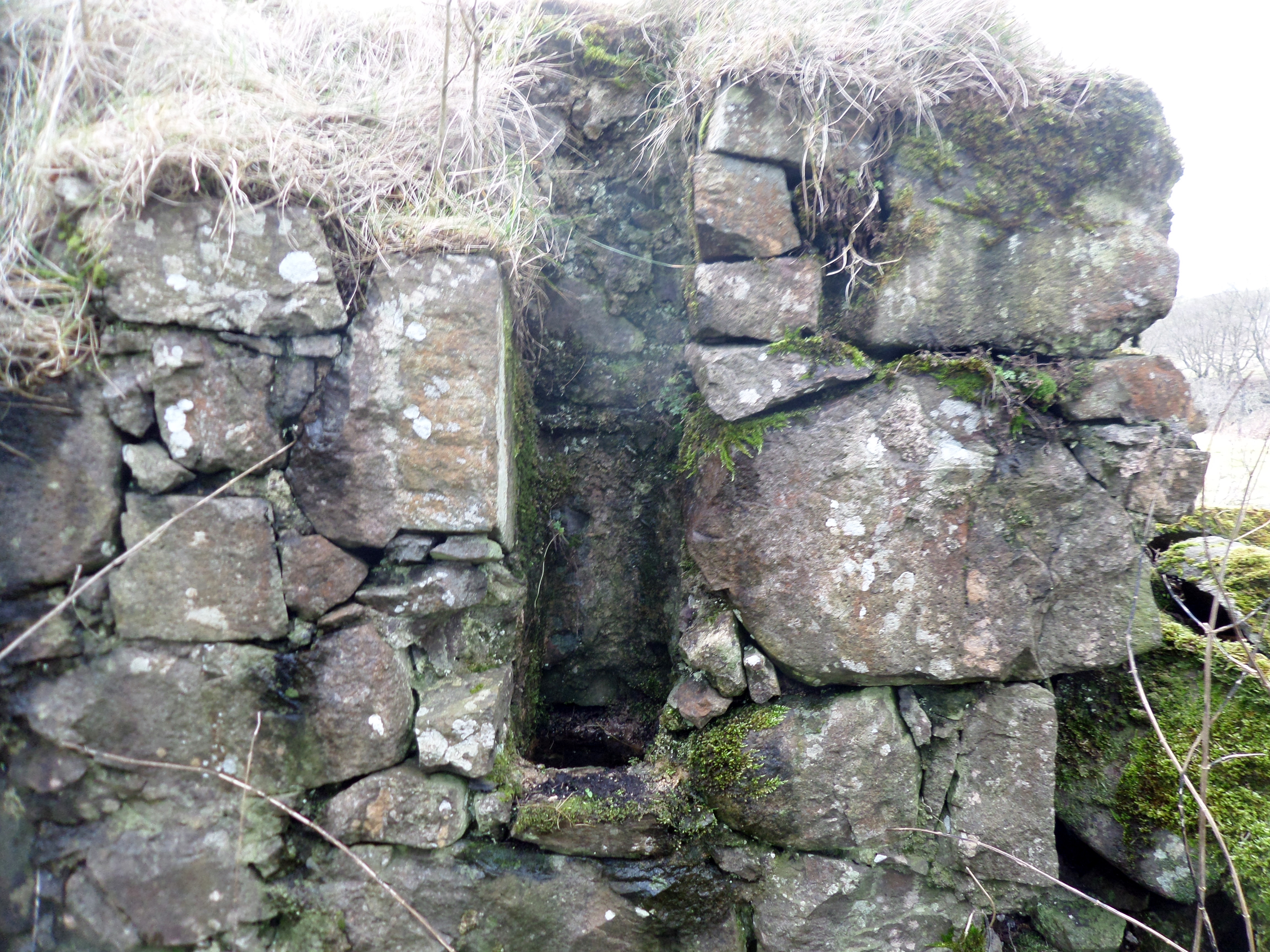
A 'slot feature' in the southern section of the ruins.

In 1831 a print of the hall indicates that the main part of the complex faced the Neilston Gap and today's ruins may have been left as an estate worker's accommodation and outbuilding when the new Cowden Hall was built and stone robbed from here was probably used in its construction or for the extensive landscaping works that stood nearby such as the loch's dam.

Two abandoned buildings, standing about 20 metres (65 feet) apart are recorded on the 1st edition of the Ordnance Survey 1:2500 map standing respectively within a rectilinear enclosure. One of these buildings was a range containing two compartments of unequal size. An outbuilding projected from the south-west end of the range. The totally demolished building was 'L' shaped in plan and had been removed by 1897.

The surviving remains of the hall consist of a rectangular structure on a north-west to south-east axis with a central division that suggest two phases of construction as one half has walls that are narrower than the other. A dominant feature in the northern section is a fireplace with a substantial lintel, the remnants of window locations are discernible. Pink harling was evidently used. Prominent slots feature in the southern section of the surviving building may have been used for timber beams hinting at a cruck and thatched roof on a single storey building.

Throughout only basic stone dressing was used employing lime mortar and rubble without clear coursing. A lean-to feature may have adjoined the southern end of the building.

In 1910 it is recorded that the old hall was surrounded by woodland composed of ancient forest sized trees including sycamore, ash and beech.

=== Crofthead House and the new Cowden Hall ===
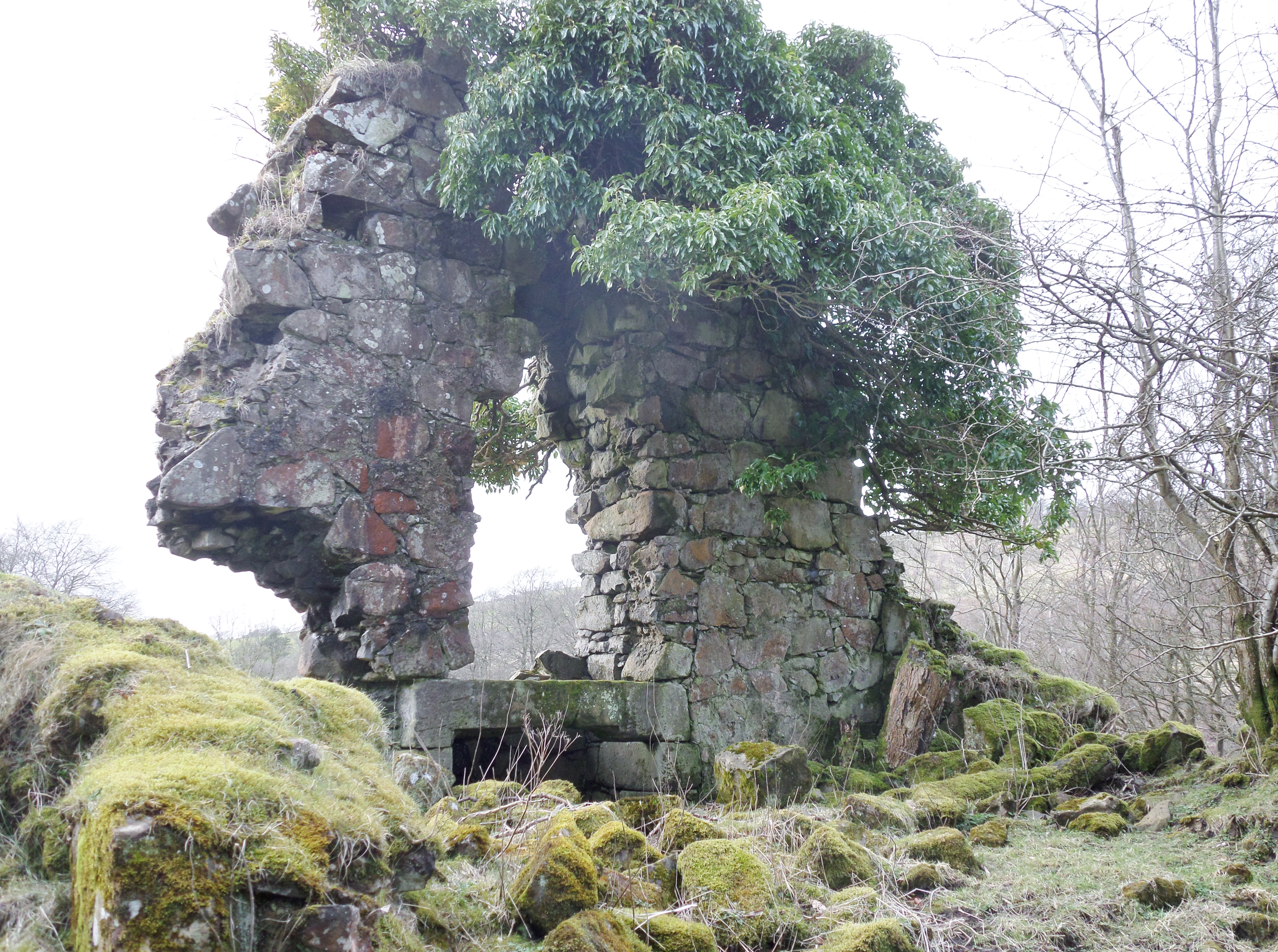
Old Cowden Hall ruins from the east.

In 1792 a cotton mill was constructed by James Orr at Crofthead below Neilston and Crofthead House was built in the 1830s, demolished and replaced by Robert Orr, a nephew, in the 1860s. The new mansion house of Cowden that was built had extensive formal landscaped gardens, an ornamental loch, walled gardens, an extensive complex of conservatories, etc.

In 1964 the 'new' Cowden Hall, the stables, conservatories, glasshouses, North Lodge, etc were demolished. The walled garden survives as well as the South Lodge.

== Micro-history ==
The Kilbarchan the 1723 Weavers Cottage has a cruck roof along the lines of what may have existed at Cowden Hall.

The ruins have changed little since 1910 apart from the part collapse of the southern gable end.

The Cowden Burn's course was altered at the time of the construction of the railway through the Neilston Gap and now runs in a man made channel to the north side of the road and next to the railway.

A parliament was attended in 1572 by Thomas Spreull, Laird of Cowden.
