= Pollokshields railway station =

Railway station in Glasgow, Scotland

Pollokshields
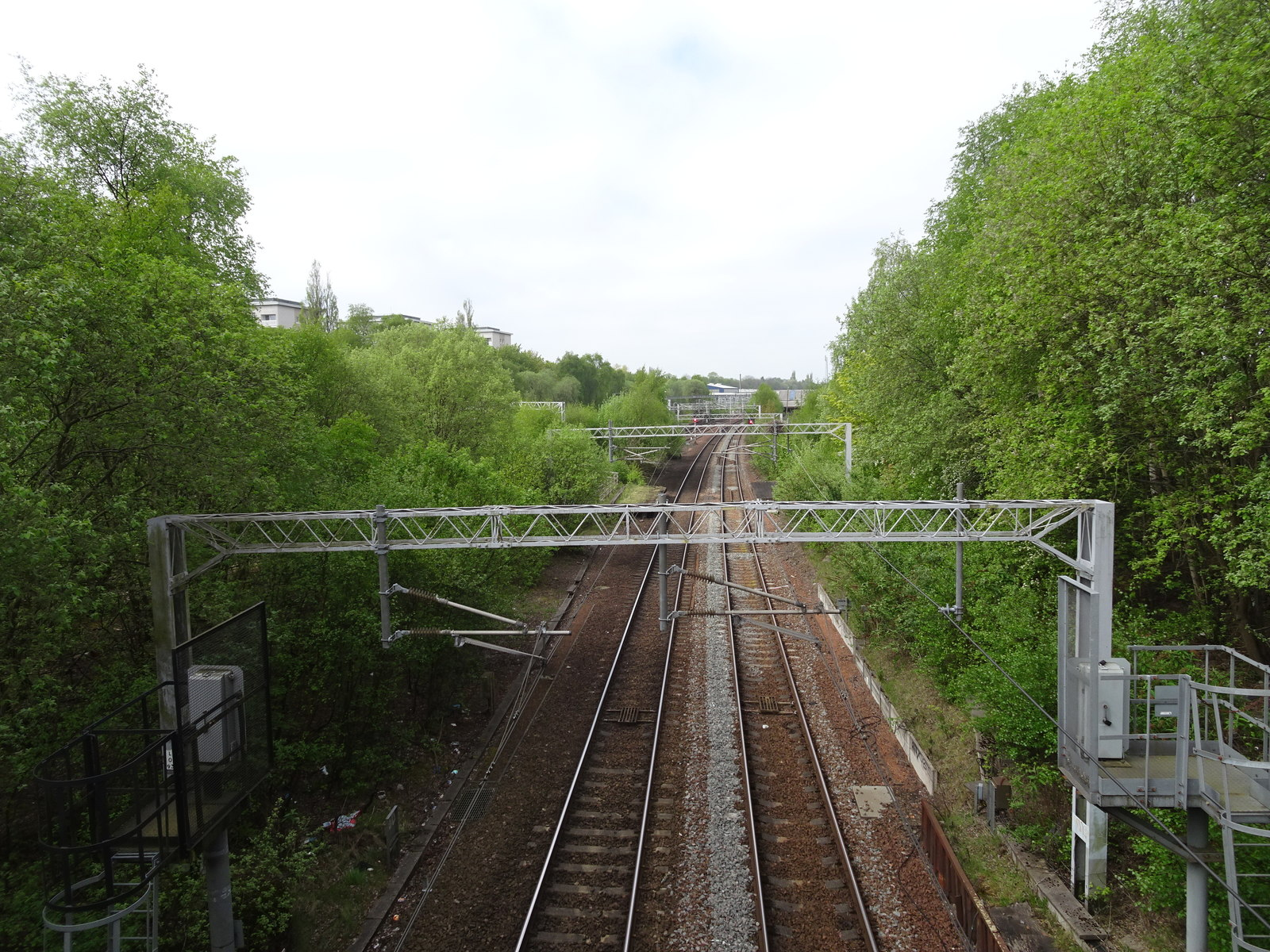

General information
- Location: Pollokshields, Glasgow; Scotland
- Coordinates: 55.8478°N 4.2759°W
- Platforms: 2

Other information
- Status: Disused

History
- Original company: Glasgow and Paisley Joint Railway
- Pre-grouping: Caledonian and Glasgow & South Western Railways
- Post-grouping: LMS

Key dates
- 14 July 1840: Opened
- 1 April 1925: Amalgamated into Shields Road
Location

Pollokshields railway station was a railway station in Pollokshields, a district of Glasgow, Scotland. The station was originally part of the Glasgow and Paisley Joint Railway. It was opened in 1840 and amalgamated into the neighbouring Shields Road station in 1925.

== History ==
Sources published in the late 20th century claim that Pollokshields station opened on 14 July 1840. Contemporary 19th century sources would suggest however that both Pollokshields station and Shields Road station were created as part of the general reorganisation of rail links between Paisley and Glasgow in the 1870s, in preparation for the opening of St Enoch station and Glasgow Central station. The adjacent Shields station was developed around the time that the Paisley Canal Line opened in 1885.

Pollokshields station amalgamated with Shields Road station and Shields station on 1 April 1925, creating a larger Shields Road station. This combined station was located within the complex of lines forming Shields Junction. In 2007, part of the platforms where the City of Glasgow Union Railway and the Glasgow and Paisley Joint Railway crossed over the former General Terminus and Glasgow Harbour Railway are still visible.

== See also ==
- Pollokshields East railway station
- Pollokshields West railway station

Preceding station	Historical railways	Following station
Ibrox; Line open; station closed	Caledonian and Glasgow & South Western Railways; Glasgow and Paisley Joint Railway	Bridge Street; Line open; station closed
Line connects into Shields Junction complex	North British and Glasgow & South Western Railways; City of Glasgow Union Railway	Cumberland Street; Line open; station closed
