= History of the Caledonian Railway (until 1850) =

This article describes the Caledonian Railway from its conception down to the year 1850.

In the 1830s and 1840s much thought was given to building a railway from central Scotland to join the growing English railway network. The hilly terrain and sparse population of the Southern Uplands made the choice of route contentious.

The Caledonian Railway succeeded in opening its line by way of a summit at Beattock in 1847 and 1848. It connected Glasgow and Edinburgh with Carlisle, and there was a branch to connect with another railway to Perth. The approaches to Glasgow were over existing mineral lines, but a superior route was later built.

The original route is a principal main line today, subject to the modifications approaching Glasgow, and later improved terminals there and in Edinburgh. The route is electrified and forms the northern section of the West Coast Main Line railway.

The general history of the company is described in the article Caledonian Railway and detail of the development of the route is at Caledonian Main Line.

== History ==
=== Coal railways ===
Primitive railways had been used in connection with mineral extraction from the sixteenth century in Central Europe, but these were not railways as we know them now: they simply allowed the manoeuvring of single wagons loaded with heavy materials within mines or from mines and quarries to another transport medium.

For some time the choice was between transport on the back of a pack animal—early roads were rarely stable enough for heavy wheeled vehicles—or on water, either a river or increasingly from the eighteenth century a canal.

In the nineteenth century the technology of railways developed rapidly to satisfy the demands of growing cities, such a Glasgow, and industry, particularly the iron industry.

In 1812 the Kilmarnock and Troon Railway opened to convey coal from pits in the Kilmarnock area to a harbour at Troon. It was a plateway in which the "rails" were L-shaped plates; the upstand of the profile guided the wagon wheels, which did not have flanges.

In 1826 the Monkland and Kirkintilloch Railway opened; this was an edge railway in which the wagon wheels had flanges for guidance, and the rails were deeper and stronger: strong enough to support heavy steam locomotives. The engineer for the scheme was Thomas Grainger, assisted by John Miller. The success of the Monkland and Kirkintilloch line, and the discovery of good quality coal and iron deposits, and of a new method of smelting iron ore, encouraged other lines in the west of Scotland, also engineered by Grainger and Miller.

The permanent way was cast iron fish-bellied rails on stone block "sleepers", and the track gauge was 4 ft 6 in (1,372 mm).

A number of other railways, particularly in the west of Scotland, followed, notably the Garnkirk and Glasgow Railway of 1831, which extended and reconstituted itself as The Glasgow, Garnkirk and Coatbridge Railway in 1845, and the Wishaw and Coltness Railway in 1844. Collectively these lines were known as the coal railways.

=== Linking with English railways ===
In 1825 the Stockton and Darlington Railway in north-east England had started operating, with enormous success. It now became clear that locomotive railways had potential, and in 1830 the Liverpool and Manchester Railway opened, the first inter-city railway in the world. Definite plans were being made for what became the London and Birmingham Railway (opened in 1837 - 1838) and the Grand Junction Railway (which progressively opened from 1837). Grainger and Miller were commissioned in 1835 to assess the route of a line linking Glasgow and Kilmarnock and Ayr; this became the Glasgow, Paisley, Kilmarnock and Ayr Railway, and the promoters had the definite intention of somehow linking Carlisle and the English railways.

The critical issue was finding a route crossing, or going round, the high ground of the Southern Uplands and the Cheviot Hills and the Pennines. The locomotives of the time were considered unable to ascend steep and lengthy gradients. Grainger and Miller designed a route via Kilmarnock, Mauchline, Sanquhar and Dumfries; its gradients were moderate but it was circuitous; it became known as the Nithsdale route.

Lancashire businessmen had been the driving force in many of the English railways, and as their plans already encompassed a network from London to Preston, their thoughts turned to reaching central Scotland. In 1835 the Grand Junction Railway commissioned the young engineer Joseph Locke to propose routes from Glasgow to Carlisle. His report examined two routes: a route following the Annan Water with a summit near Elvanfoot. This became known as the Annandale route. However it involved gradients of 1 in 75 over ten miles—at the time considered impossible—and did not pass near any major population centre. The alternative was a longer route similar to Grainger and Miller's Nithsdale route, with gentler gradients and passing through more populous areas. Locke recommended this, and his opinion was taken as authoritative for the time being.

Landowners on the Annandale route were disappointed, aware of the prosperity that a railway could bring. The Grand Junction did not immediately act on the report they had asked for: there were difficulties further south in reaching Carlisle.

Locke produced a second report, in 1837; he now found that the worst gradient could be moderated, to 1 in 93. Moreover, technical improvements in locomotives meant that the gradient was not such a daunting challenge. The Annandale route had the advantage that Edinburgh could easily be served from it.

Others were putting several other routes forward; chief among these was a route following the east coast; it was taken for granted at the time that only one trunk line between central Scotland and England was sustainable, so all the proposals were presumed to be mutually exclusive.

Locke revised his survey the following year, finding that the worst gradients could be eased a little, but now money was suddenly hard to come by, and a proposed trunk railway was inopportune.

=== The Smith-Barlow Commission ===
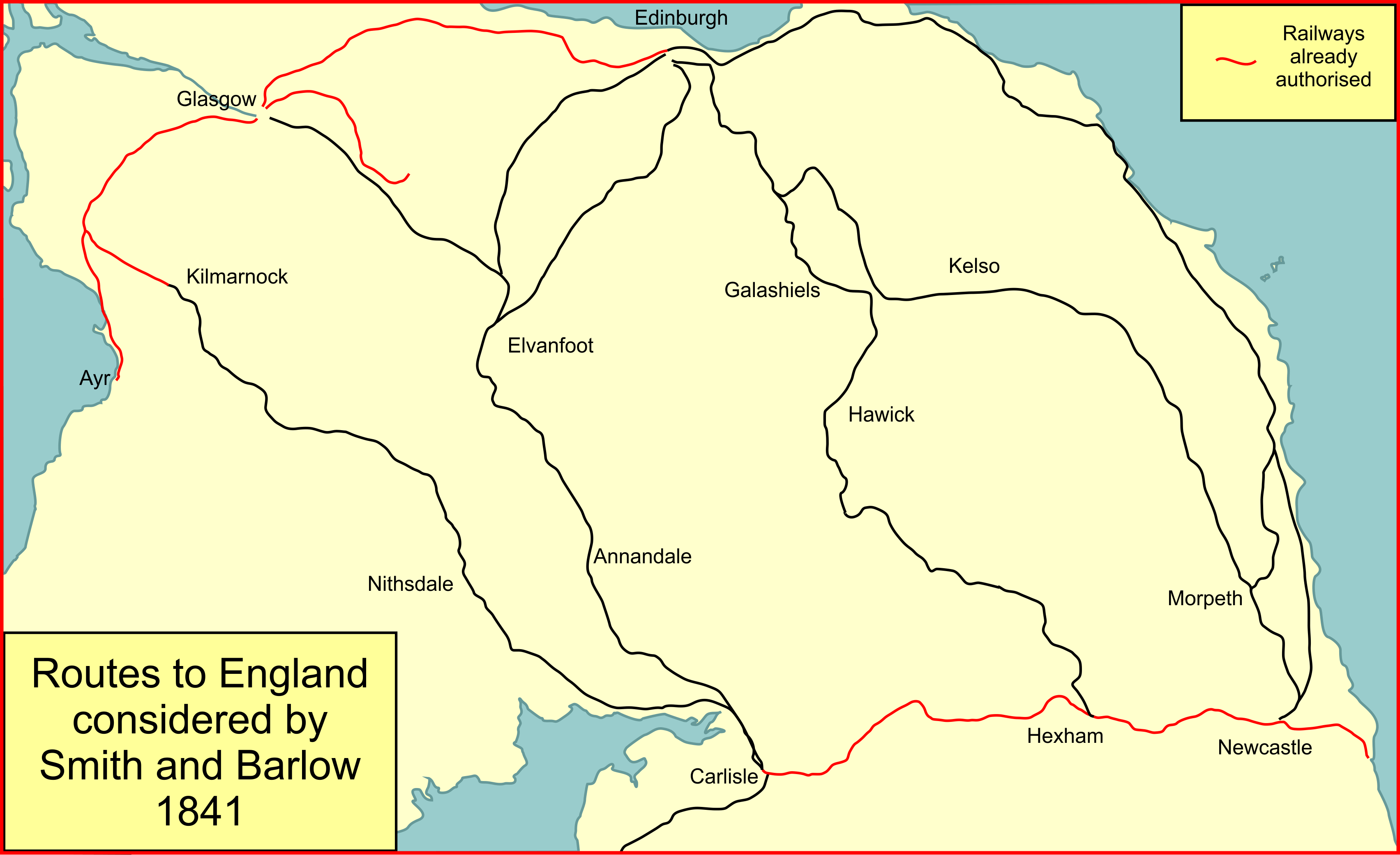
Routes to England considered by Smith and Barlow

There was considerable public interest in the formation of a railway to England. Many schemes had been put forward in the press; not all of them were practicable and many were driven by sectional interest; for example the Borders towns were pressing for a route through their area; interests supporting the Newcastle and Carlisle Railway favoured a route that connected with that line, bringing it traffic; promoters in Newcastle wanted a route from Tyneside.

In 1839 a public meeting chaired by the Lord Provost of Glasgow decided to review the alternatives; but before the engineers' report could be assessed the Government decided to appoint its own commission, and Professor Peter Barlow of the Royal Military Academy at Woolwich, and Colonel Sir Frederick Smith, Inspector General of Railways at the Board of Trade, were appointed to "make recommendations on the most effective means of railway communication from London to Edinburgh, Glasgow and Dublin".

They considered 16 schemes, although several were simply variations of one another; they were surprised that most of the promoters were unable to provide more than the most basic details of their proposals, and they found wild and inexplicable variations in unit costs assumed.

Their report was published on 15 March 1841: they repeated the assumption that only one line was required linking Scotland and England. The Annandale route was favoured, but it was qualified: anyone could build such a line provided they gave an undertaking to reach Lancaster, at that time the northern extremity of planned English railways. If this undertaking were not given, an east coast route would have preference. The uncertain conclusion, and the absence of Government money (which some had supposed the Commission would disburse), and a severe renewed tightness of the money market, stalled the whole thing for more than two years.

=== The East Coast route first ===
In fact in the following years, the insistence on a single route to England became an irrelevance, and the North British Railway issued a prospectus in August 1843 for a line from Edinburgh to meet the Newcastle and Berwick Railway.

=== Definite moves at last ===
On 19 February 1844, a preliminary committee, meeting in London, determined to issue a prospectus for a line from Carlisle to Glasgow to Edinburgh; the line would be called the Caledonian Railway Company. (Note: The name had been considered before, in the sense of a railway from Lancaster into Scotland.)

In 1844 the Garnkirk and Glasgow Railway had extended to Whifflat (later spelt Whifflet), renaming itself to the Glasgow, Garnkirk and Coatbridge Railway. At Whifflat it joined the Wishaw and Coltness Railway, and the committee discussed the possibility of running over these lines to get access to Glasgow, and agreement with them was secured. They agreed to change the gauge of their lines to suit the standard gauge of the future Caledonian Railway.

By now many other railway schemes in Scotland were under construction. The Edinburgh and Glasgow Railway had started operating in 1842, and the Scottish Central Railway was being actively promoted, as a branch from the E&GR Perth. The North British Railway, connecting Edinburgh with Berwick-on-Tweed and therefore English east coast locations, was under construction. If the Caledonian did nothing, all the traffic from north of the central belt would go to other railways. Strenuous efforts resulted in agreement with the Scottish Central to form a junction with them near Castlecary (west of Falkirk), and a branch to that point was added to the Caledonian proposals.

In fact the branch was complicated: the Caledonian already proposed to run over the Glasgow, Garnkirk and Coatbridge Railway (GG&CR) from Whifflat. Another coal railway, the Monkland and Kirkintilloch Railway (M&KR) ran alongside the GG&CR at Gartsherrie, continuing north to the canal basin at Kirkintilloch. Agreement was secured to run over 1,170 yards (1,070 m) of that line, then diverging at Garnqueen to run north-east to Castlecary. The M&KR was still using the old track gauge, but, now feeling its track to be outdated, it too agreed to convert the gauge to suit the Caledonian.

Finally, the Caledonian promoters saw that the Clydesdale Junction Railway was being put forward. It was to connect the Wishaw and Coltness Motherwell and the south side of Glasgow, incorporating and upgrading an earlier horse-operated mineral line, the Polloc and Govan Railway. The CJR would provide a more direct entry into Glasgow than the Garnkirk line, (and it was not certain that the former coal railways would give adequate precedence to express passenger trains over their mineral movements) so this was a useful ally to have.

=== Lord Dalhousie's report ===
In 1841, Professor Peter Barlow and Sir Frederick Smith had reported on a preferred route for a railway connecting with England; this report had not commanded much compliance. Now in 1844 the Government appointed a commission to recommend a route; once again the presumption was that only one trunk route into England could be supported. The investigation was led by Lord Dalhousie, President of the Board of Trade. It supported the Annandale route, and therefore the Caledonian scheme, and recommended that other lines under consideration should be restricted to local traffic only: the Nithsdale route should terminate at Cumnock, and a proposed Edinburgh to Carlisle scheme (an offshoot of the North British Railway, should stop at Hawick.

=== An act ===
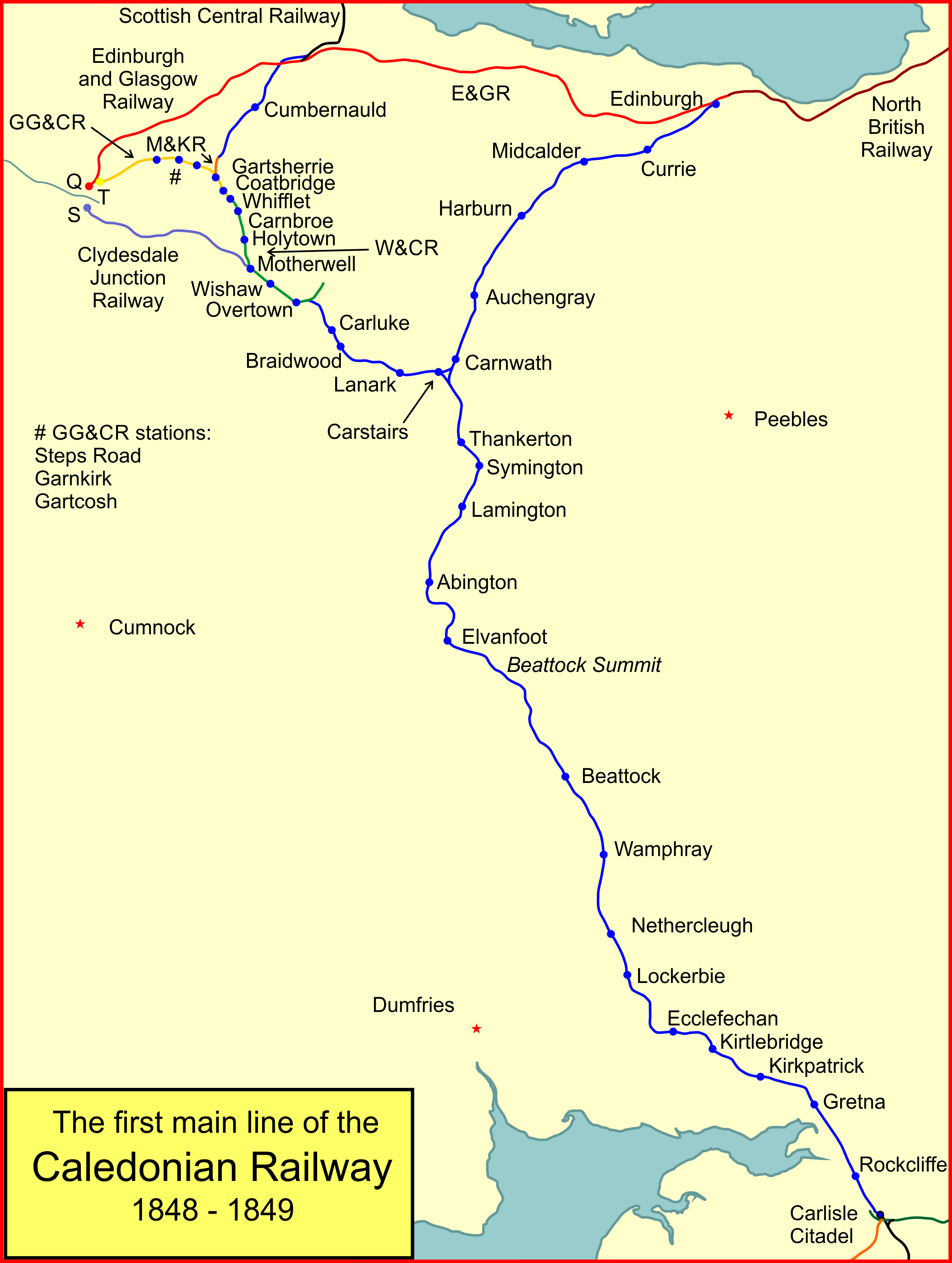
The Caledonian Railway main line in 1849

A prospectus for the Caledonian Railway, capital £1,500,000, was issued on 12 April 1845. Six weeks were spent in committee in Parliament, and the efforts were crowned with success: the Caledonian Railway Act 1845 (8 & 9 Vict. c. clxii), An Act for making a Railway from Carlisle to Edinburgh and Glasgow and the North of Scotland, to be called The Caledonian Railway was passed on 31 July 1845. The share capital was to be £1,800,000.

The Caledonian had anticipated that the Scottish Central would work with it in acquiring and upgrading the relevant coal railways, but the SCR now declined those opportunities, and announced on 25 September 1845 that it was planning to merge with the Edinburgh and Glasgow Railway.

The long gestation period had not been wasted, and construction was able to start immediately. Other new railways were authorised in the same session, in particular the Scottish Central Railway, and the Clydesdale Junction Railway.

=== A frenzy of acquisitions ===
Having achieved authorisation to build a long, and expensive main line, the Caledonian did not simply concentrate on completing the construction, but set about a complex set of negotiations designed to spread the area controlled by the company as far as possible. In most cases it did so by guaranteeing the dividend receivable by the other companies' existing shareholders. This simplified the process of gaining control, but committed the Caledonian to large and continuing periodical payments for the future.

Parliament approved the acquisition of the CJR by the Caledonian Railway on 18 August 1845. The CJR would give access to quay facilities on the Clyde, and also to the Paisley lines (the Glasgow, Paisley and Greenock Railway (GP&GR) and the Glasgow, Paisley, Kilmarnock and Ayr Railway. On 27 January 1846 a working agreement with the GP&GR was finalised, and on the same day a lease was agreed with the Glasgow, Barrhead and Neilston Direct Railway. Agreement to lease the Glasgow, Garnkirk and Coatbridge Railway was made on 1 January 1846, and in August the Clydesdale Junction Railway, still under construction, was acquired. The CJR had itself recently acquired the Polloc and Govan Railway. On 1 January 1847 the Wishaw and Coltness Railway was leased.

In 1846 the Caledonian was committed to reaching the city of Glasgow over the Garnkirk line, with a terminus inconveniently located at Townhead, at the north-eastern periphery of the city. The Clydesdale Junction gave access to quays on the Clyde, but not to the city centre. The Glasgow, Barrhead and Neilston Direct Railway had been authorised, but the location of the Glasgow end of the line is not clear. The CR and the GB&NDR collaborated in fostering a Glasgow Southern Terminal Railway, which was to build from near Titwood Place, Pollokshields (Note: On the GB&NDR route near Strathbungo.) to a bridge over the Clyde and a central Glasgow terminus at Dunlop Street, close to the later location of St Enoch station. While the proposal was obviously convenient for travellers, it aroused fierce opposition in the city, and the Admiralty demanded a swing bridge over the Clyde. A foreshortened version of the scheme, reaching only as far as the South Side terminus near Cumberland Street, was authorised on 16 July 1846.

Numerous other railway schemes had been proposed in the 1845 and 1846 sessions, many of them with "Caledonian" in their title although unconnected. A general tightness of money made many of these unable to proceed to Parliament, or if authorised to be constructed, but the CR was anxious to complete its line; the several English railways that were to form the West Coast Route had consolidated under the title the London and North Western Railway (LNWR) and had reached Carlisle on 15 December 1846, adding to the feeling of urgency. Premium payments were offered to the contractors if they could finish the construction early.

Adding to the frenzy of alliances, the Scottish Midland Junction Railway now came under notice; it had an authorised line northwards from Perth to Forfar, but having connectivity to several further destinations. After lengthy discussions, its line was agreed to be leased to the Scottish Central Railway by decision of 18 February 1847; the SCR itself was already agreed to be leased to the CR, although this fell through in mid-1847. Later in 1847 leases of the Dundee and Perth Railway and the Dundee and Arbroath Railway were confirmed.

=== Opening at last ===
On 1 and 4 September 1847 Captain J L E Simmons, Inspector of Railways at the Board of Trade made an inspection of the line as far as Beattock. There were nine viaducts, 39 overbridges and 37 underbridges, and 11 level crossings. The track was double, with 75 lb/yd rails on cross-sleepers. There had been a slip of the embankment on Solway Moss, near the English border; actually the moss itself had subsided under the weight of the embankment, and "by dint, however, of great exertion, [the subsided section] was completely filled up previous to my return on the 4th". Simmons approved the opening to passenger trains, subject to the Moss section being watched, and run over slowly.

On 9 September the Directors had a trial trip and on the 10th, public operation started, from Carlisle to Beattock. There were three trains each way daily, with onward coach connections for Glasgow and Edinburgh, giving a journey time to and from London of the order of 22 hours.

On 14 February 1848 the Directors were able to make a trial trip between Glasgow and Beattock, and the following day a full service started, with through coaches to and from London. The Glasgow terminus was the Townhead station of the Garnkirk line. This opening was followed by opening between Edinburgh and Carstairs on 1 April 1848; passenger trains ran between Edinburgh and Glasgow.

=== The Scottish Central Railway ===
The Scottish Central Railway and the Caledonian were physically joined at Greenhill Junction (near Castlecary) on 7 August 1848. The SCR had opened on 22 May 1848 with a junction to the E&GR at Greenhill. The original plan had been for the Caledonian to lease the SCR but that had fallen through. In the run-up to the day of making the connection, another attempt was made to agree arrangements—the SCR did not have enough engine power to work its line itself—but the SCR wanted more payment than the Caledonian was prepared to pay, and the agreement fell through once again. A compromise temporary arrangement was agreed in early October 1848.

With the opening of the Scottish Midland Junction Railway main line on 20 August 1848, a through route from Dundee to London was available. The line was to be leased jointly to the Caledonian and the E&GR.

The Caledonian and the E&GR had agreed to lease the Scottish Central Railway (which itself held leases of other companies), but Parliamentary authority was required. Now differences opened up between the Caledonian and the E&GR on the issue, with the outcome that the SCR was informed that the lease would not be taken up. However the Caledonian concluded a working agreement with the SCR, effective from 1849.

=== Shareholder dissatisfaction ===
The Company had now taken on a huge number of leases of other companies, and in most cases what appeared to be generous guaranteed rentals had been committed. Many shareholders believed there was little chance of operating income paying off those charges, and when the Directors announced that they had leased the Dundee and Perth and Aberdeen Railway Junction Company there was an explosion of discontent. (The D&P&ARJ had been formed when the Dundee and Perth Railway leased the Dundee and Newtyle Railway and the Dundee and Arbroath Railway.) Shareholders passed a vote of no confidence in their directors, but at a Special Meeting at Euston on 10 November the board secured a narrow majority of support.

=== Working results to 1849 ===
The alarm about financial mismanagement did not go away. A 3% dividend was declared at the end of 1848, while guaranteed dividends to leased companies' shareholders up to 9% were being paid out. It was later asserted plausibly that this was an illegal payment of dividend out of capital. At the shareholders' meeting on 26 February 1849 a large volume of improper shareholdings in other companies was revealed: this was discovered to amount to £492,000 in holdings kept secret from shareholders. By the end of 1849 it was disclosed that the company had expended £1,984,764 on constructing the line, more than £700,000 above the contractors' tenders.

A Shareholders' Committee examined the activities of the directors and it was critical of numerous commitments taken on. It accepted that good faith had motivated these dealings, though many of them were probably illegal and also not immediately beneficial to the company in cash terms. However although the Directors were heavily criticised, there was no fundamental change in the board, directors retiring at the expiry of their ordinary terms.

Meanwhile, the lease of the Wishaw and Coltness Railway was ratified by parliament on 28 July 1849, and of the Glasgow, Barrhead and Neilston Direct Railway on 1 August 1849.

=== Opening of Buchanan Street and South Side stations ===
On 1 June 1849 the Clydesdale Junction Railway was completed; it connected the Wishaw and Coltness line at Motherwell (old station) and the new South Side station in Glasgow, alongside the Glasgow, Barrhead and Neilston Direct Railway station there (opened on 27 September 1848). Now trains from London used South Side as their Glasgow terminus. Hamilton was linked in to this route from 10 September 1849.

On 1 November 1849 Buchanan Street station opened, on an extension of the Garnkirk line. Trains to Edinburgh, Stirling and Carlisle used the new station; the Stirling trains had to reverse at Gartsherrie Junction. The Garnkirk's old Glebe Street (Townhead) station was reduced to goods and mineral duties.

=== The first lap completed ===
As 1849 drew to a close, the Caledonian Railway had completed its first task: the railway was open from Glasgow and Edinburgh to Carlisle, with through trains running to and from London. Between Glasgow and Edinburgh a competitive service was run, although the Edinburgh and Glasgow Railway completed the journey faster. Carlisle Citadel station was in use, jointly owned with the London and North Western Railway. Through trains ran to Stirling and Perth over the Scottish Central Railway line from Greenhill.

=== Financial woes ===
However the company was in extremely poor financial health, due to huge financial commitments taken on by leasing other companies: these arrangements had mostly been made in good faith, but possibly reckless enthusiasm, to secure territory against incursion from rival companies, of which there were many. In most cases the agreements had been to pay a fixed percentage on the capital of the leased company, and this represented an unbearable burden on the Caledonian's income. In other cases some illegal dealings in other companies' shares were disclosed when shareholders forced an enquiry.

The lease agreement of the Dundee and Perth and Aberdeen Railway Junction was repudiated, on the basis that it was illegal. Some other lease agreements were renegotiated somewhat more favourably. Nonetheless at the end of 1849 a shareholder enquiry estimated that an annual loss of £66,164 (excess of lease charge over revenue) was being incurred on active leased lines.

In February 1850 matters came to a head; two bank debentures totally £245,000 were due for repayment, as well as considerable arrears of lease charges to the Wishaw and Coltness and others. There was a clear-out of board members, but the new board faced a daunting challenge; it was hoped to convert the debentures into mortgages, and possibly to merge with the Edinburgh and Glasgow Railway.

On 1 April 1850 the Aberdeen line was completed and the Caledonian was now part of a through line from London to the Granite City.

The Company now tried to stall the agreed merger with the Glasgow, Paisley and Greenock Railway, which was itself mired in controversy over financial irregularity.

The task for the new board now was to operate the railway and generate some cash income.

== Passenger train service ==
The 1850 Bradshaw's Timetable shows five trains each way daily (two on Sundays). Two of the weekday trains called at all stations. Most of the trains divided at Carstairs with separate Glasgow and Edinburgh portions, and again at Gartsherrie with separate Perth portions. (Note: Bradshaw never explicitly says that there are through coaches as opposed to a connection.) The fastest journey from Glasgow Buchanan Street to Carlisle is 3hrs 22mins, but there is a single train shown from South Side (over the Clydesdale Junction line) joining the same train at Motherwell requiring 20 minutes less; the distance is 2 miles less. The same train reached London Euston in 9hrs 50mins from South Side. No passenger train used the Float Junction to Lampits Junction curve in this timetable.

== After 1850 ==
The Caledonian Railway quickly established itself as the dominant route from Central Scotland to England, rivalling the Glasgow and South Western Railway and the North British Railway. It had expended much energy and money on securing alliances with other trunk routes, and its financial performance disappointed shareholders in the subsequent decades. It concentrated on developing the areas it served, and minerals became a particularly important traffic. Rivalry with the G&SWR and the NBR descended into bitter and often destructive competition to retain dominance in areas it considered its own, and to penetrate areas of other lines.

The sparsely populated terrain south of Lanark militated against the construction of branch lines: there were only a short line to Moffat, a Wanlockhead branch, a Dumfries branch, and an ambitious line crossing the Solway Firth to bring mineral trains in without passing through the congested Carlisle area. Both these routes have long closed.

Glasgow Central station was opened in 1879, giving a more convenient, and modern, access to the city for the route.

With its English partner, the London and North Western Railway, it formed a strong alliance, operating together as the West Coast Main Line, a term used to this day. From 1923 the two companies with others were grouped by the Railways Act 1921, forming the London Midland and Scottish Railway.

Many intermediate stations were closed in the 1960s, and in fact outside the central belt, only Lockerbie and Carstairs stations remain open.

The first main lines described above remain as important trunk routes, modified in the approaches to Glasgow and the main passenger terminal there and in Edinburgh. The climb to the summit at Beattock continued to be a daunting obstacle until electrification on 22 April 1974, since when the available traction power has diminished the problem.

Today there is a frequent passenger service and significant freight flows.

== Topography ==
Locations on the Caledonian Railway routes down to the end of 1850. Locations in italic were not passenger stations.

=== Carlisle to Glasgow ===
Opened from Carlisle to Beattock on 10 September 1847; from Beattock to Garriongill Junction (with Wishaw and Coltness Railway) on 15 February 1848.

- Carlisle Citadel; joint with the London and North Western Railway; may have opened with LNWR only on 1 September 1848; also known as "Carlisle" and "Carlisle Joint" station; still open;
- Rockcliffe;
- Gretna; also junction for Glasgow, Dumfries and Carlisle Railway to Dumfries from 23 April 1848, although passenger trains did not run through at first;
- Kirkpatrick;
- Kirtlebridge; probably opened March 1848;
- Ecclefechan;
- Lockerbie; still open;
- Nethercleugh;
- Wamphray;
- Beattock;
- Beattock Summit;
- Elvanfoot; first in timetables April 1848;
- Abington;
- Lamington; first in timetables April 1848;
- Symington;
- Thankerton;
- Float Junction; junction for Edinburgh line; this was some distance south of the present-day south chord at Carstairs, immediately north of the Float Viaduct over the River Clyde;
- Carstairs; still open;
- Lanark; later renamed Cleghorn when the Lanark branch opened in 1855;
- Braidwood; first in timetables August 1848;
- Carluke; still open;
- Garriongill Junction; junction with the Wishaw and Coltness Railway from Coltness;
  - Wishaw and Coltness Railway section
- Overtown;
- Wishaw; the present-day Wishaw station opened in 1880 and is on a different route;
- Motherwell; the station was replaced later by the present-day station further towards Glasgow;
- Holytown; previously known as Mossend, and reverted to Mossend when the present-day Holytown opened;
- Carnbroe Iron Works; may have been a private station for workmen; possibly closed 1847;
- Whifflet; known as Whifflat prior to Caledonian days; the present-day (re-opened) station is close to this location;
  - Glasgow, Garnkirk and Coatbridge Railway section
- Coatbridge; the present-day Coatbridge Central station;
- Gartsherrie;
- Gartcosh;
- Garnkirk;
- Steps Road;
- Glasgow Townhead.

On 1 November 1849 the line was extended from Milton Junction to Glasgow, Buchanan Street, and Townhead station became a goods depot.

=== Carstairs to Edinburgh ===
Opened 15 February 1848.

- Carstairs; see above;
  - Float Junction; south chord line; see above;
- Lampits Junction; convergence of Carstairs station line and Float Junction line;
- Carnwath;
- Auchengray;
- Harburn;
- Midcalder; still open as Kirknewton;
- Currie;
- Slateford; renamed Kings Knowes in 1853 when the present-day Slateford opened on another site;
- Edinburgh, Lothian Road.

The line was diverted to Edinburgh, Princes Street station in 1870.

=== Castlecary Branch ===
Opened 7 August 1848.

- Gartsherrie; see above;
  - Monkland and Kirkintilloch Railway section
- Garnqueen Junction; divergence of M&KR line;
  - Caledonian Railway section
- Cumbernauld;
- Greenhill Lower Junction; junction with Scottish Central Railway towards Stirling.

=== Gradients ===
Northbound from Carlisle the line climbs at 1 in 200 from near Gretna to Ecclefechan (about 14 miles), then falling briefly. From Wamphray the main climb starts, at 1 in 200 then stiffening to 1 in 88 to 1 in 74 to Beattock Summit (1,016 feet, 310 metres, above sea level), a climb of 15 miles. The southbound climb starts at Uddingston (on the Clydesdale Junction section) at 1 in 107 to 1 in 98, easing near Cleghorn, but climbing again at 1 in 100 to 1 in 194; the distance is 44 miles of which about 8 miles are falling or level.

The Carstairs to Edinburgh line climbs from Carstairs at 1 in 102 to 1 in 225 to Cobbinshaw (10 miles) then falling at 1 in 100, slackening to 1 in 220, all the way to Slateford, a distance of 16 miles.

The Castlecary line has moderate gradients until a climb of about a mile approaching Cumbernauld at 1 in 95, then falling at 1 in 128 to 1 in 99 to Greenhill Junction.

=== Clydesdale Junction line ===
The Clydesdale Junction Railway opened on 1 June 1849, and some Caledonian Railway passenger trains used that route to the Glasgow South Side terminus.
