= Renfrew Porterfield railway station =

Disused railway station in Renfrew, Renfrewshire

Renfrew Porterfield

General information
- Location: Renfrew, Renfrewshire; Scotland
- Coordinates: 55.8747°N 4.4031°W
- Grid reference: NS496670
- Platforms: 2

Other information
- Status: Disused

History
- Opened: 1 June 1903; 123 years ago
- Closed: 19 July 1926; 100 years ago
- Original company: Glasgow and Renfrew District Railway
- Post-grouping: London, Midland and Scottish Railway
Location

Renfrew Porterfield railway station served the town of Renfrew, Renfrewshire, Scotland from 1903 to 1926 on the Glasgow and Renfrew District Railway.

== History ==
The station opened on 1 June 1903 by the Glasgow and Renfrew District Railway. To the west was the goods yard with sidings serving works buildings. To the north of the island platform was the signal box. The station closed on 17 July 1926.

== Description ==
The station was a terminus, situated on the north side of Porterfield Road, directly across from Renfrew South and consisted of two platforms. It was constructed within the Babcock and Wilcox Works, located to the south of Renfrew on the east bank of the White Cart Water. The station was built west of the original Paisley and Renfrew Railway, which was initially connected to it.

The station's island platform facilitated trains that departed to the north, with looped lines running down either side of it. There was also a building on the platform with canopies. To the west, there was a substantial goods yard that could be accessed from the north, and it had headshunts to the north as well. Additionally, sidings on the west side ran to the works buildings.

At the north end of the island platform was a signal box, which was the second one to be named 'Porterfield'. It opened along with the station in 1903. The line to the north passed over the Paisley and Renfrew Railway near Renfrew Fulbar Street before proceeding southwest to Cardonald Junction via Kings Inch and Deanside.

The area where the station was located has now been converted into a residential development, and the railway line to the north has been completely erased. On the southern side of Porterfield Road, the former Paisley and Renfrew Railway path now serves as the works' access road.

| Preceding station | Disused railways | Following station |
|---|---|---|
| King's Inch; Line and station closed | Glasgow and Renfrew District Railway | Terminus |
