= Govan railway station =

Former railway station in Scotland

Govan

General information
- Location: Govan, Glasgow; Scotland
- Coordinates: 55.8616°N 4.3108°W
- Platforms: 2

Other information
- Status: Disused

History
- Original company: Glasgow and Paisley Joint Railway
- Pre-grouping: Glasgow and Paisley Joint Railway
- Post-grouping: London, Midland and Scottish Railway

Key dates
- 2 December 1868: Opened
- 1 July 1875: Closed
- 1 March 1880: Reopened
- April 1899: Closed
- May 1902: Reopened
- May 1906: Closed
- January 1911: Reopened
- 9 May 1921: Closed to regular services
Location

Govan railway station was a railway station in Govan, a district of Glasgow, Scotland. The station was originally part of an extension to the Glasgow and Paisley Joint Railway.

== History ==
The station opened on 2 December 1868. During the station's lifetime it was closed several times: between 1 July 1875 and 1 March 1880, April 1899 and May 1902, and between May 1906 and January 1911. The station closed permanently to regular passenger services on 9 May 1921.

The Glasgow Subway's Broomloan Depot is near to the site of Govan station, and uses part of the old trackbed as a test track.

== Footnotes ==
Preceding station	Disused railways	Following station
Terminus	Caledonian and Glasgow & South Western Railways; Glasgow and Paisley Joint Railway (Govan Branch)	Ibrox; Line and station closed
Terminus	Caledonian and Glasgow & South Western Railways; Glasgow and Paisley Joint Railway (Govan Branch)	Cardonald; Line closed, station open
