= Shields railway station =

Former railway station in Scotland

Shields

General information
- Location: Pollokshields, Glasgow; Scotland
- Coordinates: 55.84769°N 4.27553°W
- Platforms: 2

Other information
- Status: Disused

History
- Original company: Glasgow and South Western Railway
- Post-grouping: LMS

Key dates
- 1885: Opened
- 1 April 1925: Amalgamated with Shields Road station and Pollokshields station into new Shields Road
- 14 February 1966: Closed
Location

Shields railway station was a railway station in Pollokshields, Glasgow, Scotland.

== History ==
Shields station was built by the Glasgow and South Western Railway when the Paisley Canal Line opened in 1885.

Contemporary maps show that, at Shields Junction, the Glasgow, Paisley and Johnstone Canal and towpath had run alongside the Caledonian Railway line shortly before it connected to the Glasgow and Paisley Joint Railway. There was plenty of space for the development of the new line and station buildings, as the canal had not followed as straight a course as the railway track to replace it would.

After Shields station opened, there were three adjacent stations at Shields Junction operated by different railway companies. Shields Road station and Pollokshields station were situated to the north of Shields station.
