= Glasgow and Renfrew District Railway =

Scottish railway line

Glasgow and Renfrew District Railway Act 1897
- Act of Parliament
- Parliament of the United Kingdom
- Long title: An Act for incorporating the Glasgow and Renfrew District Railway Company and authorising the construction of Railways in the Counties of Renfrew and Lanark and for other purposes.
- Citation: 60 & 61 Vict. c. clxxi

Dates
- Royal assent: 6 August 1897

Text of statute as originally enacted

The Glasgow and Renfrew District Railway was nominally owned by the Glasgow and Paisley Joint Railway. It was incorporated on 6 August 1897 by the Glasgow and Renfrew District Railway Act 1897 (60 & 61 Vict. c. clxxi) and opened on 1 June 1903.

In the 1921 Railway Grouping it became part of the London, Midland and Scottish Railway (LMS).

== The route ==
=== Passenger and freight services ===
The line left the main Glasgow and Paisley Joint Railway at Cardonald and travelled in a north-westerly direction towards the River Clyde. The first passenger station on the line being at Deanside; however this station closed on 2 January 1905. The next station was King's Inch.

The line then followed the direction of the River Clyde where it crossed over the top of the Paisley and Renfrew Railway before turning south west, and running parallel with the Paisley and Renfrew Railway.

Its terminal station Renfrew Porterfield was located close to the Paisley and Renfrew Railway's Renfrew South.

The Caledonian Railway and the Glasgow and South Western Railway were each solely responsible for running passenger services to Renfrew Porterfield for six-month blocks, after which the other company took over for six months. This arrangement ran from 1903 to 1907; after that passenger services were provided solely by the Glasgow and South Western Railway.

=== Freight branches ===
Freight branches were also built to service traffic on the River Clyde at:

- King's Inch.
- Shieldhall.

== 20th century expansion ==
This was due in part to the building of the King George V Dock at Shieldhall: the south side opened in 1931; and the west side in World War II. In addition, the Deanside and Braehead Transit Depots opened in World War II to handle increased traffic through the docks. This led to a buildup in freight traffic on the line.

The building of a coal-fired power station at Braehead after World War II also lead to considerable freight traffic on the King's Inch branch. The power station was later converted to oil firing.

== Closure ==
Deanside was the first station to close; it closed on 2 January 1905. Renfrew Porterfield and King's Inch stations closed on 19 July 1926. However, the line to Renfrew Porterfield continued to be used for freight, as did the freight-only branches.

Braehead power station was closed and demolished in the early 1990s; it is being redeveloped as the Braehead regeneration project.

== See also ==
- Paisley and Renfrew Railway
- Glasgow and Paisley Joint Railway
