= Cardonald railway station =

Railway station in Glasgow, Scotland

Cardonald Scottish Gaelic: Cair Dhòmhnaill
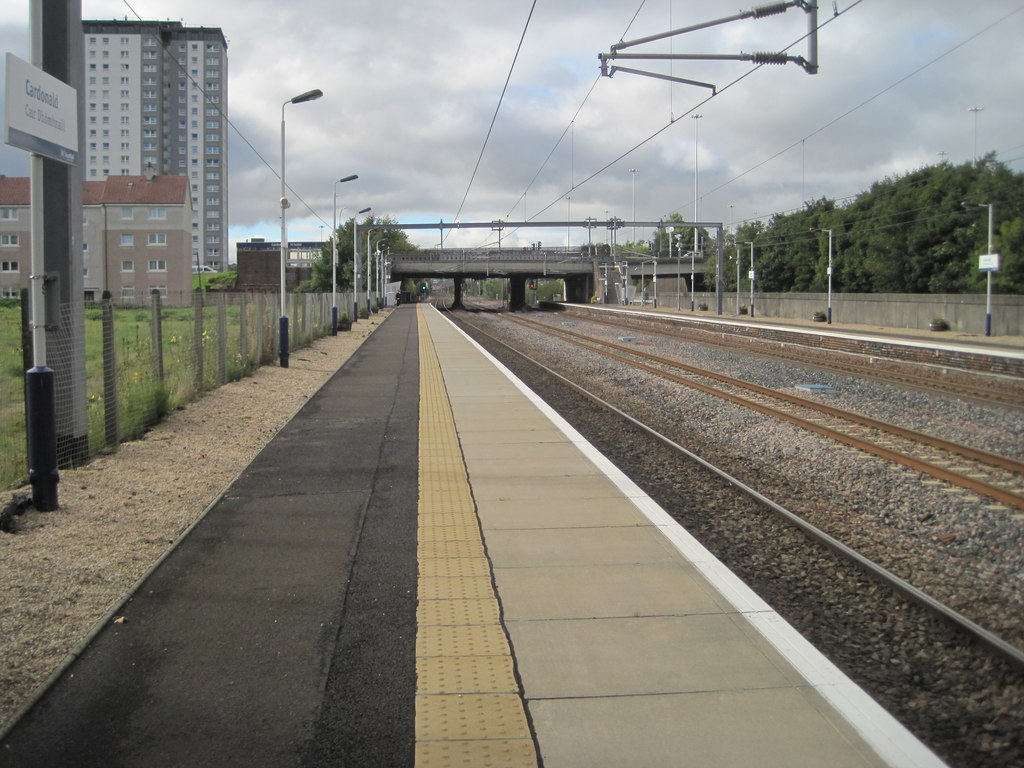
- Cardonald railway station

General information
- Location: Cardonald, Glasgow; Scotland
- Coordinates: 55.8526°N 4.3395°W
- Grid reference: NS535646
- Managed by: ScotRail
- Transit authority: SPT
- Platforms: 2
- Tracks: 3

Other information
- Station code: CDO
- Fare zone: 1

Key dates
- 1 July 1843: Opened as Moss Road
- 1845: Closed
- 1 October 1879: Reopened and renamed Cardonald

Passengers
- 2020/21: ▼0.123 million
- 2021/22: ▲0.167 million
- 2022/23: ▲0.182 million
- 2023/24: ▲0.214 million
- 2024/25: ▲0.223 million
Location
Notes
- Passenger statistics from the Office of Rail and Road

Cardonald railway station is located in the Cardonald district of Glasgow, Scotland, also serving parts of the Drumoyne neighbourhood located on the opposite side of the M8 motorway which runs adjacent to the railway. The station is managed by ScotRail and is on the Inverclyde Line.

== History ==
The station opened on 1 July 1843 as Moss Road and closed in 1845. The station was reopened and renamed Cardonald on 1 October 1879.

On 24 March 2008, a woman was hit by a train at Cardonald. She later died of her injuries.

== Services ==
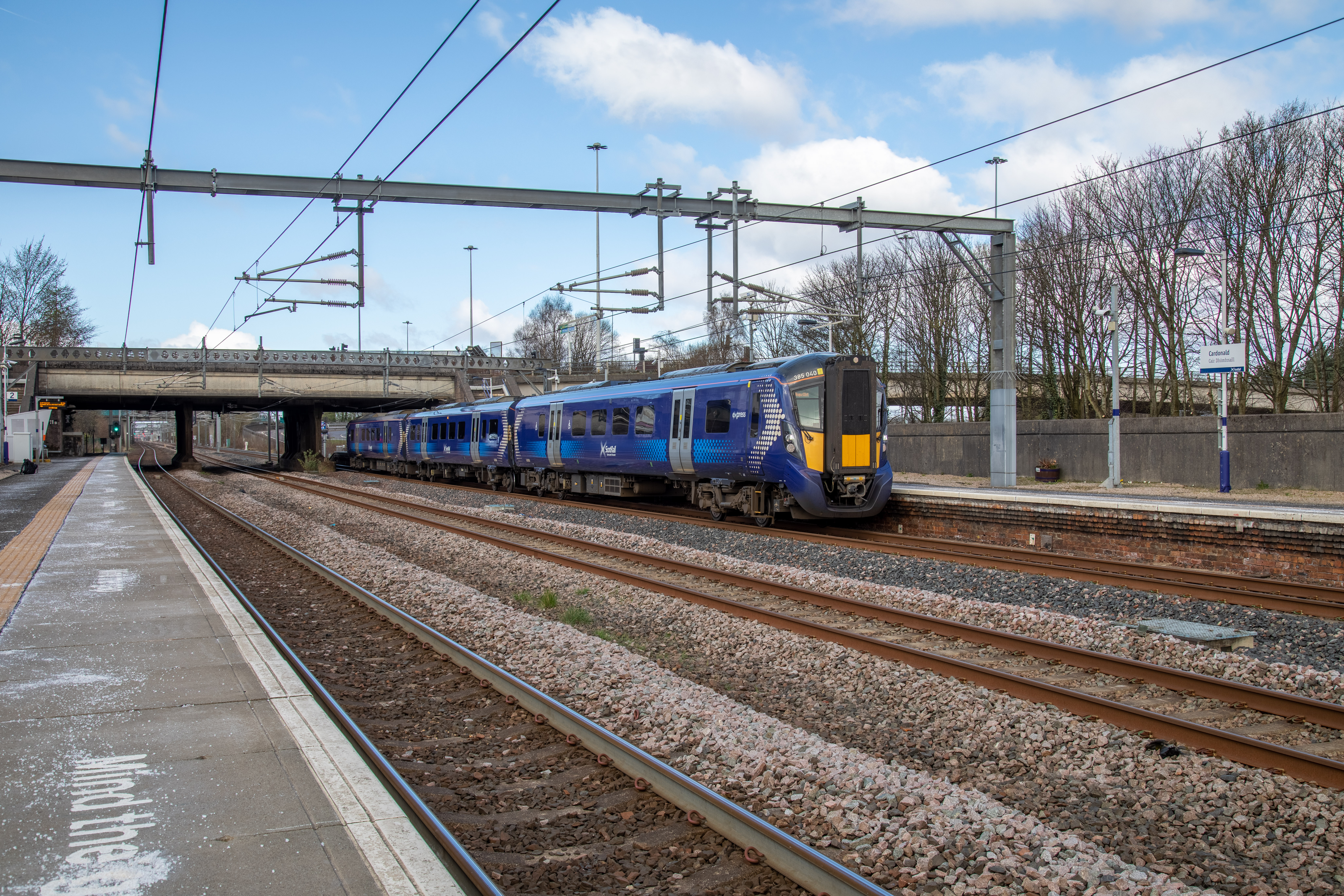
A Class 385 at the station

- 2tph to Glasgow Central
- 2tph to Gourock

The evening service is:

- 1tph to Wemyss Bay
- 1tph to Gourock
- 2tph to Glasgow Central

There is an hourly service each way on Sundays to Glasgow & Gourock.

Preceding station	National Rail	Following station
Hillington East	ScotRail; Inverclyde Line	Glasgow Central
	Historical railways	
Deanside; Line and station closed	Caledonian and Glasgow & South Western Railways; Glasgow and Renfrew District Railway	Connection with G&PJR
Paisley Gilmour Street	Caledonian and Glasgow & South Western Railways; Glasgow and Paisley Joint Railway (Govan Branch)	Govan; Line and station closed
Paisley Gilmour Street	Caledonian and Glasgow & South Western Railways; Glasgow and Paisley Joint Railway	Ibrox; Line open; station closed
