= Ibrox railway station =

Former railway station in Scotland

Ibrox

General information
- Location: Ibrox, Glasgow; Scotland
- Coordinates: 55.8501°N 4.3129°W
- Platforms: 2

Other information
- Status: Disused

History
- Original company: Glasgow and Paisley Joint Railway
- Pre-grouping: Caledonian and Glasgow & South Western Railways
- Post-grouping: LMS

Key dates
- 6 November 1843: Opened as Bellahouston
- 1845: Closed
- 1 March 1871: Reopened and renamed Ibrox
- 6 February 1967: Closed
Location

Ibrox railway station was a railway station in Ibrox, a district of Glasgow, Scotland. The station was originally part of the Glasgow and Paisley Joint Railway.

== History ==
The station opened on 6 November 1843 and was known as Bellahouston. Bellahouston had a short life and was closed in 1845. However, the station was reopened and renamed Ibrox on 1 March 1871. Ibrox station was closed to passengers on 6 February 1967.

== Reopening ==
In 2008, the Rangers Supporters' Trust issued a statement calling for the station to be reopened. The suggestion was met with a lack of interest from officials, the public and the media, because Ibrox Stadium is already well served by public transport in the form of bus routes and the subway. The calls were made after it had been announced that public transport was to be improved in the East End of Glasgow, including the Celtic Park area, in time for the 2014 Commonwealth Games.

As of 2024 the Glasgow Subway's Broomloan Depot has taken over much of the track bed from the former site of Govan railway station, while the track bed between former Govan and Ibrox stations is now used as a test track and storage facility for subway rolling stock.

Preceding station	Historical railways	Following station
Govan; Line and Station closed	Caledonian and Glasgow & South Western Railways; Glasgow and Paisley Joint Railway (Govan Branch)	Pollokshields; Line open; Station closed
Cardonald; Line and Station open	Caledonian and Glasgow & South Western Railways; Glasgow and Paisley Joint Railway	Pollokshields; Line open; Station closed
