= Shields Road railway station =

Former railway station in Scotland

Shields Road
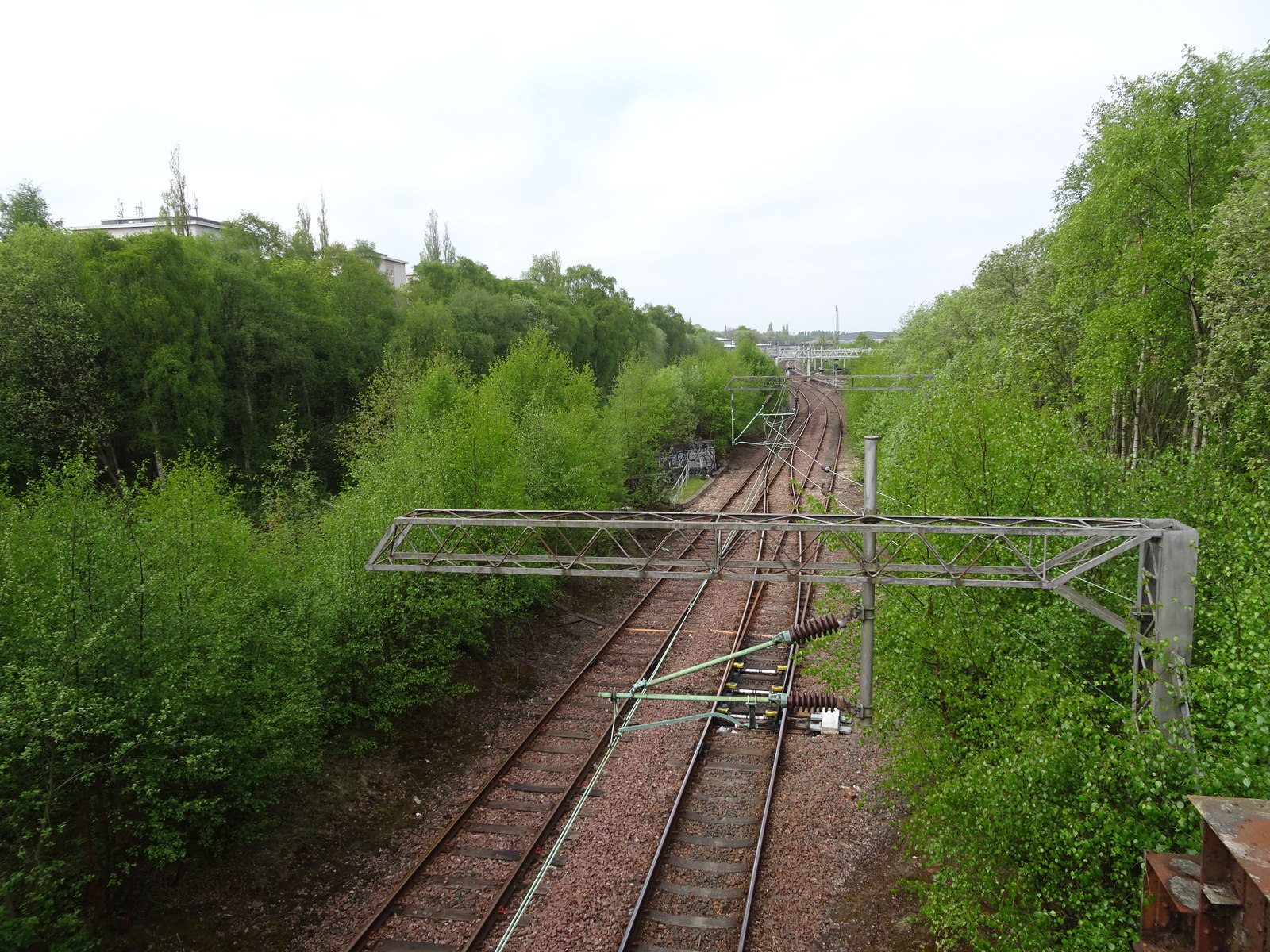

General information
- Location: Pollokshields, Glasgow; Scotland
- Coordinates: 55.8477°N 4.2755°W
- Platforms: 2, latterly 4

Other information
- Status: Disused

History
- Original company: City of Glasgow Union Railway
- Pre-grouping: Caledonian and Glasgow & South Western Railways
- Post-grouping: LMS

Key dates
- 12 December 1870: Opened
- 1 January 1917: Closed
- 1 April 1925: Amalgamated with Shields station and Pollokshields station into new Shields Road
- 14 February 1966: Closed
Location

Shields Road railway station was a railway station in Pollokshields, Glasgow, Scotland. Opened in 1870, it was expanded in 1925 when the adjacent Pollokshields and Shields stations were amalgamated into it. It closed in 1966.

== History ==
The station was built by the City of Glasgow Union Railway on the original 1840 line from Paisley to Glasgow. It opened in the early 1870s, around the time when the line was being diverted from Bridge Street to the new St Enoch station in the city centre, initially terminating at Dunlop Street.

Contemporary maps show that there were no stations at Shields Junction, prior to the general reorganisation of rail links between Paisley and Glasgow in the 1870s, in preparation for the opening of the new city centre terminals.

From 1885, however, after Shields station opened, there were three adjacent stations at this site, each with their own booking offices fronting Shields Road. Shields Road station was the largest of the three, sharing one of its platforms with Pollokshields station, which had been squeezed into the northern part of the complex, on the new track which had been laid to establish a link between Paisley and the Caledonian Railway’s proposed Glasgow Central station.

The three stations at Shields Junction were amalgamated in 1925, creating a larger Shields Road station, which was in use until 1966, when train services to St Enoch ended.
