= King's Inch railway station =

Disused railway station in Renfrew, Renfrewshire

King's Inch

General information
- Location: Renfrew, Renfrewshire; Scotland
- Coordinates: 55.8796°N 4.3837°W
- Grid reference: NS509677
- Platforms: 1

Other information
- Status: Disused

History
- Original company: Glasgow and Renfrew District Railway
- Post-grouping: LMS

Key dates
- 1 June 1903: Opened
- 19 July 1926: Closed
Location

King's Inch railway station served the town of Renfrew, Renfrewshire, Scotland from 1903 to 1926 on the Glasgow and Renfrew District Railway.

== History ==
The station opened on 1 June 1903 by the Glasgow and Renfrew District Railway. On the west side was the goods yard which had a goods shed and a loading bank. The signal box was to the south west. The station was known as Renfrew Central when it first opened. The station closed on 19 July 1926 with the signal box closing in 1932.

Preceding station	Disused railways	Following station
Deanside; Line and station closed	Glasgow and Renfrew District Railway	Renfrew Porterfield; Line and station closed
