= Deanside railway station =

Railway station that served Hillington, Glasgow

Coordinates: 55.8726°N 4.3661°W

Deanside

General information
- Location: Hillington, Glasgow; Scotland
- Platforms: 1

Other information
- Status: Disused

History
- Original company: Glasgow and Renfrew District Railway

Key dates
- 1 June 1903: Opened
- 1 January 1905: Closed
Location

Deanside railway station was a short-lived railway station that served the suburb of Hillington, Glasgow, Scotland from 1903 to 1905 on the Glasgow and Renfrew District Railway.

== History ==
The station opened in 1903 by the Glasgow and Renfrew District Railway. The signal box was to the east of the line. There was a siding, called the Clyde Trust Siding, to the north west which served Renfrew Harbour. Deanside Depot was accessed by the reverse siding and was situated on the north side of Old Renfrew Road. The station closed in 1905.

Preceding station	Disused railways	Following station
King's Inch; Line and station closed	Glasgow and Renfrew District Railway	Cardonald; Line closed, station open
