= Clydesdale Junction Railway =

Scottish railway company

The Clydesdale Junction Railway company was formed to build a railway connecting Motherwell and Hamilton with Glasgow, in Scotland.

Conceived for local journeys, it was used by the main line Caledonian Railway to get access to Glasgow, and was soon taken over by the larger company. The route formed an alternative main line to Glasgow for the Caledonian, and eventually was the dominant route to the city.

Although the Company was taken over before completion of its line, its short route remains in heavy use today as part of the West Coast Main Line, carrying heavy inter-city and suburban traffic, and some freight.

== History ==
=== Authorisation ===
The Clydesdale Junction Railway was promoted to connect Hamilton and Motherwell with the southern side of Glasgow, by joining the eastern end of the Polloc and Govan Railway, and forming a short line from it to a Glasgow terminal.

Clydesdale Junction Railway Act 1845
- Act of Parliament
- Parliament of the United Kingdom
- Long title: An Act for making a Railway from the Termination of the Polloc and Govan Railway at Rutherglen to Hamilton, and to the Wishaw and Coltness Railway at Motherwell, to be called "The Clydesdale Junction Railway."
- Citation: 8 & 9 Vict. c. clx

Dates
- Royal assent: 31 July 1845

Text of statute as originally enacted

It obtained an authorising act of Parliament, the Clydesdale Junction Railway Act 1845 (8 & 9 Vict. c. clx), on 31 July 1845, with capital of £330,000. At Motherwell it linked with the Wishaw and Coltness Railway at a point a little east of the present-day station and junction.

=== The Caledonian ===
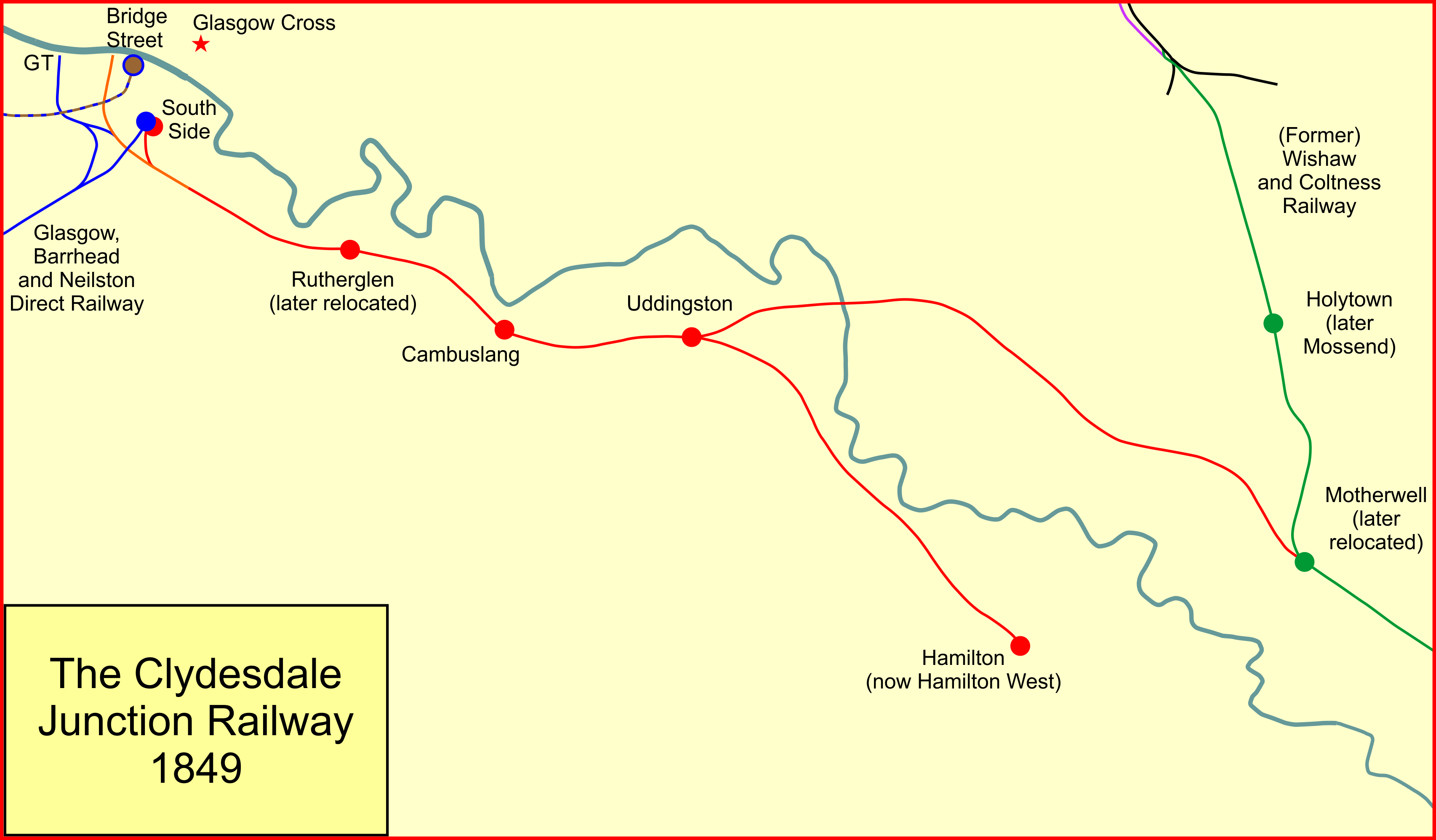
System map of the Clydesdale Junction Railway

The Caledonian Railway obtained its own authorising act of Parliament, the Caledonian Railway Act 1845 (8 & 9 Vict. c. clxii), in the same session, on the same day. The Caledonian had struggled for a long time to get approval for its main line linking Glasgow and Edinburgh with Carlisle and the burgeoning English railway network. Contemplating a long main line through relatively unpopulated terrain, the Caledonian had sought to economise by routing its line into Glasgow over two former "coal railways": the Wishaw and Coltness Railway, and the Glasgow, Garnkirk and Coatbridge Railway, successor to the Garnkirk and Glasgow Railway. It was to lease those lines and they were to be modernised: they were partly horse-operated with primitive track on stone block sleepers, and had used a track gauge that had become common among Scottish mineral lines but was incompatible with the standard gauge used by the emerging national railway network.

The route into Glasgow traced a broad northward sweep from Motherwell by way of Gartsherrie and Garnkirk, to a cramped and inconveniently located terminal at Townhead in Glasgow. The Caledonian now realised that the Clydesdale Junction line would give them an alternative, possibly superior, route to the City. In a quick submission, the Caledonian obtained authorisation to acquire the Clydesdale Junction and the Polloc and Govan by the Caledonian, Polloc and Govan, and Clydesdale Junction Railways Amalgamation Act 1846 (9 & 10 Vict. c. ccclxxix) of 18 August 1846.

The Clydesdale Junction Railway also purchased the Polloc and Govan Railway in August 1846; the owner, William Dixon, received 2,400 Caledonian Railway shares in payment, suggesting that the Clydesdale was already in thrall to the Caledonian. Clydesdale Junction shareholders were guaranteed 6% on its capitalisation of £450,000, with the option of having their shares purchased by the Caledonian for cash at a premium of 50%. (The Clydesdale was still under construction and the shares were not fully paid up.).

=== Construction ===
The engineers for the line were Joseph Locke and John Edward Errington, the contractor was the firm of Brassey, Mackenzie and Stephenson.

The Clydesdale, like the Caledonian, had been authorised at the height of the railway mania, and the inevitable slump was now in force. The Clydesdale found it difficult to get subscriptions paid, and in November 1847 considered deferring further construction. However Thomas Brassey agreed to continue the work against credit, in effect financing the construction himself.

=== Opening ===
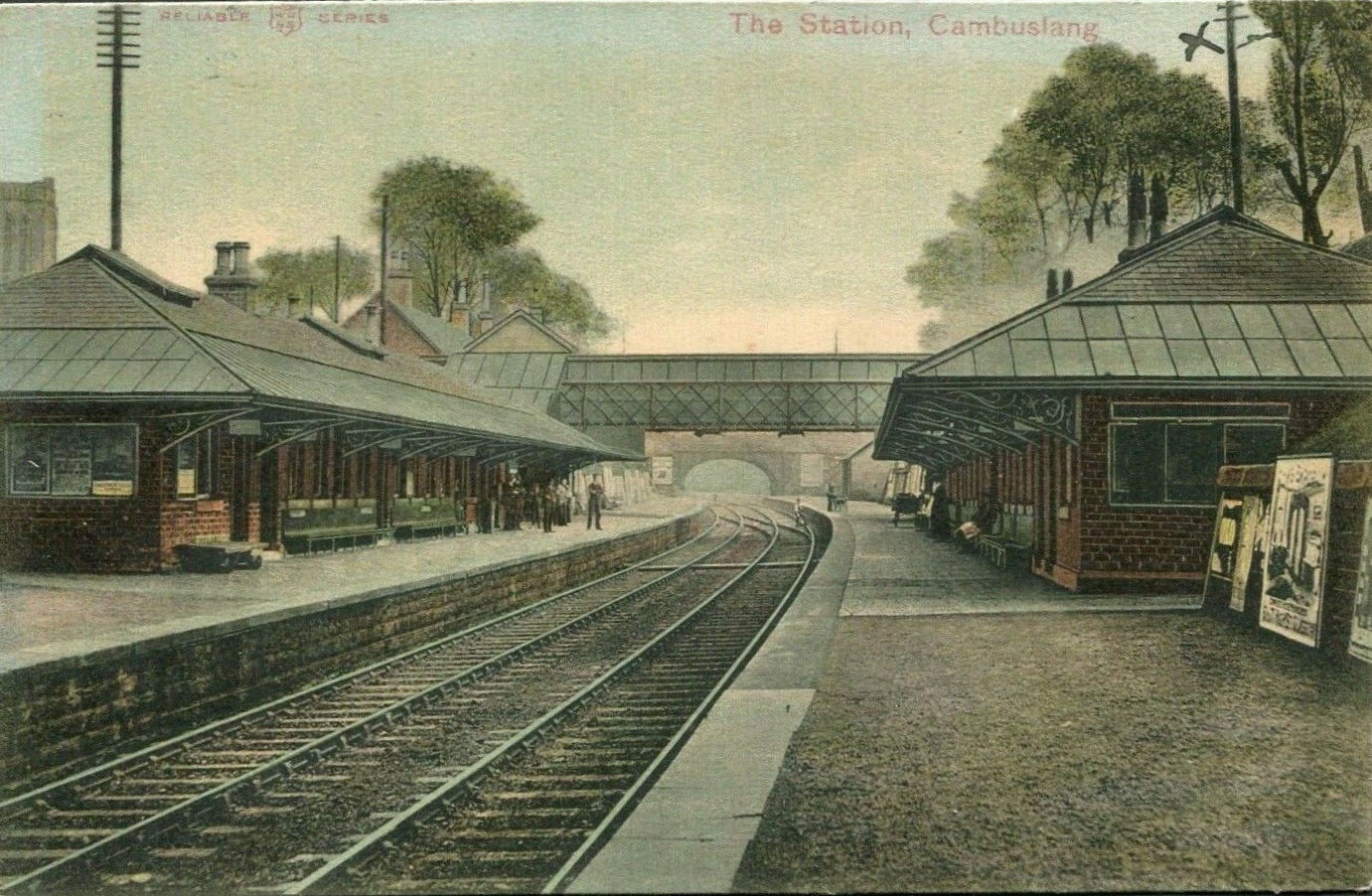
Cambuslang station

The line opened between Rutherglen and Motherwell on 1 June 1849, between Newton and Hamilton on 10 September 1849. (Note: According to Ross (page 53)Awdry says 5 September (page 68) and Paterson says 17 September (page 288).) At this time the General Terminus and Glasgow Harbour Railway made a connection to the Clydesdale line at Larkfield Junction, giving access from the Motherwell direction to River Clyde shipping berths at General Terminus.

On 27 September 1848 the Glasgow, Barrhead and Neilston Direct Railway (GB&NDR) had opened a Glasgow terminus called South Side, (Note: The station is sometimes referred to as South Side and Gushetfaulds, or simply Gushetfaulds.) located in the angle where Cathcart Road and Pollokshaws Road converge. The Clydesdale Junction line formed a northward extension from the original Polloc and Govan line, reaching its own South Side station alongside the GB&NDR station. At first both stations were primitive affairs, but in 1849 the reception building was rebuilt to an imposing design by the architect William Tite.

The Caledonian was engaged in extending the Townhead line to a new Glasgow terminus called Buchanan Street, but in November 1849 it was advertising two daily return trains to Edinburgh from South Side; the trains ran to and from Greenock over the friendly Glasgow, Paisley and Greenock Railway. The Greenock line did not run directly into South Side, and the trains must have run to Larkfield Junction and reversed into South Side before continuing their journey. The route to Edinburgh was via Carstairs. There were five return journeys to Hamilton.

=== Financial difficulties ===
By now the Clydesdale line was an intrinsic part of the Caledonian Railway, but the Clydesdale Junction Railway Company continued to exist, expecting to receive its guaranteed 6%. In fact the Caledonian had significantly over-reached itself financially, in desperation to acquire or lease numerous railways under construction so as to secure territory against competitors. For some time it had been failing to make the payments that were due, and there were suggestions of major financial irregularity within the Caledonian. In 1851 the Clydesdale company in concert with other concerns in the same position; the Caledonian attempted to stall by objecting that they should not have to pay out for railways that gave them inadequate income, but this was an obvious distortion of the legal position, and in May the Caledonian had to agree to pay £20,000 in arrears to the Clydesdale. An agreement later that year guaranteed payments of £25,250 annually in perpetuity, money that at the time the Caledonian could ill afford.

=== Later history ===
The Clydesdale Junction Railway itself was now simply a part of the Caledonian Railway, and its small extent made it a minor part. Nonetheless it was a key part of the system. When Glasgow Central station opened in 1879, all of the Carlisle traffic was diverted to that terminus, running over the Clydesdale Junction line.

As suburban traffic developed towards the end of the nineteenth century and in the following decades, the route became increasingly important.

South Side station closed in 1877 but the site was developed as a goods yard; in the 1970s it became Gushetfaulds Railfreight Terminal, and then Gushetfaulds Freightliner Terminal. However opening of the Euroterminal at Coatbridge rendered that redundant, and the site closed to rail use.

The curving route to the north end of the terminal brings it close to the old City of Glasgow Union Railway line, and it has been suggested that a link there would be part of the Crossrail Glasgow scheme, enabling through running from the Motherwell direction to the north side of the Clyde at Bellgrove and beyond. However the Crossrail Glasgow scheme is as yet unfunded.

== Topography ==
Location list at opening of the line, 1 June 1849 (Motherwell to South Side), 10 September 1849 (Hamilton branch).

  - Motherwell to South Side
- Motherwell; Wishaw and Coltness Railway station, somewhat to the east of the present station, at Merry Street, near the present-day Crosshill Street;
- Uddingston; at times known as Uddingston Central; still open;
- Hamilton Branch Junction; Hamilton line trails in;
- Cambuslang; still open;
- Rutherglen; replaced later by the present station in 1879;
- Larkfield Junction; junction towards the General Terminus and Greenock lines;
- South Side; may have been known as Gushetfaulds for the first few months; closed to passengers 1879 when the line was extended to Bridge Street.
  - Hamilton branch
- Hamilton; renamed Hamilton West in 1876 on extension of the line to the present Hamilton Central; still open;
- Blantyre; still open;
- Hamilton Branch Junction; see above.

== Connections to other lines ==
- Polloc and Govan Railway at Rutherglen
- Rutherglen and Coatbridge Railway between Rutherglen and Cambuslang
- Glasgow Central Railway at Newton
- Lanarkshire and Ayrshire Railway at Newton
- Hamilton Branch of the Caledonian Railway at Newton
- Cleland and Midcalder Line at Uddingston
- Coalburn Branch of the Caledonian Railway at Motherwell
- Motherwell Deviation Line of the Caledonian Railway at Motherwell
- Wishaw and Coltness Railway at Motherwell

== Current operations ==
This line is still in use as part of the Argyle Line, also used by West Coast and East Coast Main Line trains, and by the Shotts Line between Rutherglen and Uddingston.

== Notes ==
=== Sources ===
- Awdry, Christopher (1990). Encyclopaedia of British Railway Companies. Sparkford: Patrick Stephens Ltd. ISBN 1-8526-0049-7. OCLC 19514063. CN 8983.
- Butt, R. V. J. (October 1995). The Directory of Railway Stations: details every public and private passenger station, halt, platform and stopping place, past and present (1st ed.). Sparkford: Patrick Stephens Ltd. ISBN 978-1-85260-508-7. OCLC 60251199. OL 11956311M.
- Jowett, Alan (March 1989). Jowett's Railway Atlas of Great Britain and Ireland: From Pre-Grouping to the Present Day (1st ed.). Sparkford: Patrick Stephens Ltd. ISBN 978-1-85260-086-0. OCLC 22311137.
- Nock, Oswald (1961). The Caledonian Railway (1st ed.). London: Ian Allan. OCLC 366646513.
- Nock, Oswald (1964). The Caledonian Railway (2nd ed.). London: Ian Allan. OCLC 21002535.
- Nock, Oswald (1973). The Caledonian Railway (3rd ed.). Shepperton: Ian Allan. ISBN 0-7110-0408-0. OCLC 16232981.
- Railscot on the Clydesdale Junction Railway
