= General Terminus and Glasgow Harbour Railway =

Former railway line in Scotland

General Terminus and Glasgow Harbour Railway Act 1846
- Act of Parliament
- Parliament of the United Kingdom
- Long title: An Act for making a Railway from the Polloc and Govan Railway to the River Clyde and Harbour of Glasgow, with Branches, to be called "The General Terminus and Glasgow Harbour Railway."
- Citation: 9 & 10 Vict. c. cxxx

Dates
- Royal assent: 3 July 1846

The General Terminus and Glasgow Harbour Railway was authorised by the General Terminus and Glasgow Harbour Railway Act 1846 (9 & 10 Vict. c. cxxx) on 3 July 1846 and it opened, in part, in December 1848.

Its main function was intended to be the transportation of coal from collieries and Lanarkshire and Ayrshire, other railways, to a coal depot on the south bank of the River Clyde.

It linked the Polloc and Govan Railway with the Glasgow and Paisley Joint Railway, the Glasgow, Paisley, Kilmarnock and Ayr Railway, the Glasgow, Barrhead and Kilmarnock Joint Railway and the Clydesdale Junction Railway.

General Terminus and Glasgow Harbour Railway (Branches) Act 1847
- Act of Parliament
- Parliament of the United Kingdom
- Long title: An Act to enable the General Terminus and Glasgow Harbour Railway Company to make Branch Railways to the Caledonian and other adjoining Railways, and to amend the Act relating to such Railway.
- Citation: 10 & 11 Vict. c. lxxv

Dates
- Royal assent: 2 July 1847

Text of statute as originally enacted

Caledonian Railway (General Terminus Purchase) Act 1854
- Act of Parliament
- Parliament of the United Kingdom
- Long title: An Act for vesting in the Caledonian Railway Company certain Portions of the Undertaking of the General Terminus and Glasgow Harbour Railway Company.
- Citation: 17 & 18 Vict. c. clxxxiv

Dates
- Royal assent: 24 July 1854

Text of statute as originally enacted

Caledonian and General Terminus Railways Amalgamation Act 1865
- Act of Parliament
- Parliament of the United Kingdom
- Long title: An Act to authorize the Amalgamation of the General Terminus and Glasgow Harbour Railway Company with the Caledonian Railway Company; and for other Purposes.
- Citation: 28 & 29 Vict. c. clxvii

Dates
- Royal assent: 29 June 1865

Text of statute as originally enacted

By the Caledonian Railway (General Terminus Purchase) Act 1854 (17 & 18 Vict. c. clxxxiv), on 24 July 1854 parts of the line were vested with the Caledonian Railway; and final amalgamation occurred on 29 June 1865 under the Caledonian and General Terminus Railways Amalgamation Act 1865 (28 & 29 Vict. c. clxvii).

In the 1921 Railway Grouping it became part of the London, Midland and Scottish Railway (LMS).

== The route ==
From its terminus at the River Clyde, the General Terminus and Glasgow Harbour Railway proceeded to Scotland Street Junction, where one branch crossed under the Glasgow and Paisley Joint Railway to join the City Union Line at Port Eglinton Junction. The other branch crossed under both the Glasgow and Paisley Joint Railway and the Paisley Canal Line; before splitting at Terminus Junction. One branch joined the Glasgow, Barrhead and Neilston Direct Railway and the Cathcart District Railway at Muirhouse Central Junction, the other branch passed through one of the Eglinton Street Tunnels and joined the Polloc and Govan Railway.

== The locomotives ==
General Terminus and Glasgow Harbour Railway Locomotives 1851 to 1865
Name	Wheel Arrangement	Foundry	Built	Notes
1	0-4-0	J M Rowan & Co	1851	Caledonian Railway No 116
2	0-4-0	J M Rowan & Co	1851	Caledonian Railway No 117
3	0-4-0ST	Neilson & Co	1855	Caledonian Railway No 93
4	0-4-0ST	Neilson & Co	1855	Caledonian Railway No 94

== Expansion under British Railways ==
In 1954, as part of their development of their Ravenscraig steelworks near Motherwell, Colvilles Ltd and British Railways began installing new wharfage and facilities at General Terminus Quay. This was to allow the simultaneously unloading of two large ships carrying bulk iron ore. The ships were designed to hold 12,000 tons (12,200 tonnes) of iron ore.

Iron ore was to be transported, in bulk, by railway, from the River Clyde to the Lanarkshire steel works at, Motherwell. In March 1949, forward plans by Colvilles suggested that the General Terminus Quay ore handling facility would be handling two million tons of basic iron ore per year. 1,020,000 tons per year for the Clyde Iron Works and 980,000 tons for Ravenscraig steelworks. In 1954, Scotland imported 1,436,000 tons (1,460,000 tonnes) of iron ore, mainly from Sweden, North Africa, and Newfoundland.

== Run down and redevelopment ==
The opening of the deep water Hunterston Ore Terminal, near West Kilbride, in the early 1970s led to The General Terminus Quay ceasing to handle this traffic and the ore handling equipment was demolished in the early 1980s.

A large area of the river frontage, including part of Windmillcroft Quay, Springfield Quay, General Terminus Quay, Mavisbank Quay and Princes Dock, was cleared in the early 1980s. Mavisbank Quay and the mostly infilled Princes Dock area was used to host the 1988 Glasgow Garden Festival. The former Glasgow Garden Festival site was relatively quickly redeveloped after the end of the six month festival; however the General Terminus Quay site was left vacant. It has since been used for housing and nearly all traces of the railway line have been removed between the River Clyde and its passage under the Glasgow and Paisley Joint Railway.
