= Polloc and Govan Railway =

Mineral railway in Scotland

The Polloc and Govan Railway was an early mineral railway near Glasgow in Scotland, constructed to bring coal and iron from William Dixon's collieries and ironworks to the River Clyde for onward transportation.

When the Clydesdale Junction Railway was projected in the nineteenth century, it used part of the alignment of the Polloc line to reach Glasgow from Rutherglen, and that part of the route is in use today as the main access to Glasgow Central station from the Motherwell direction.

== John Dixon: first waggonway ==
John Dixon came from Sunderland to Glasgow and established coal pits at Knightswood and Gartnavel, in what are now the western suburbs of Glasgow. About 1750 he purchased a glassworks at Dumbarton, and to transport his coal to the works, he built a wooden waggonway from the pit mouth to Yoker. The coal was loaded into barges, which went down with the ebb tide to Leven. By 1785 the glassworks was the largest in the United Kingdom, consuming 1,500 tons of coal per annum.

A newspaper correspondent wrote in 1852:

The coal from the pits of the Woodside district about the middle of the last century was mostly consumed at the glass works at Dumbarton. My informant says that there was at this time a wooden tram road commencing at the Woodsise coal pits which crossed the Dumbarton Road, and extended to a quay situated on the river, nearly opposite to Renfrew, from which quay the coals were shipped by gabberts to Dumbarton. I do not think that this tram road existed in my day, but about 70 years ago, I walked on the tram road from the Little Govan Coal Works to the Coal Quay, then situated on the south banks of the river at the grounds lately of Todd and Higginbotham, and I rather think that the Dumbarton Glass Works Company were at that time interested in the Little Govan Coal Works as well as the Woodside Coal Works.

== The Govan Waggonway ==
The Knightswood pit became exhausted and Dixon acquired mineral rights in the Little Govan estate. Between 1775 and 1778, his son William Dixon built a line from Govan coal pits to Springfield on the south bank of the Clyde. At that time "Govan" extended to the south-east of the city; the coal pits were in the area bounded by the present-day M74, Polmadie Road and Aikenhead Road. "Springfield" was a quay on the south bank of the Clyde, immediately west of West Street, although Wherry Wharf was the actual quay used. The alignment of the waggonway was broadly south-east to north-west, skirting round the south of the built up area of the time, and the approach to the Clyde was along what became West Street. Privately built and not requiring Parliamentary authority, this became known as the Govan Waggonway.

Dixon built it on the principle familiar to him from Tyneside, with timber cross-sleepers and timber rails, and wagons with flanged wheels were pulled by horses.

In 1810 the Glasgow, Paisley and Johnstone Canal was nearing completion, with its Glasgow termination at Port Eglinton; this faced the west side of Eglinton Street immediately south of, and opposite, the Cumberland Street junction; the area is long since built over. According to Paterson (page 207), "On 1 August 1811, William Dixon (Junior), coalmaster, bought 1,242 square yards of ground from the Corporation of Glasgow of building a tramway on which to convey coal from his Govan pits to the Ardrossan Canal basin at Port Eglinton." The main line of the waggonway was of course already long established, and this must refer to Dixon's intention to build a short connecting branch to the canal basin.

== Upgrading the line ==
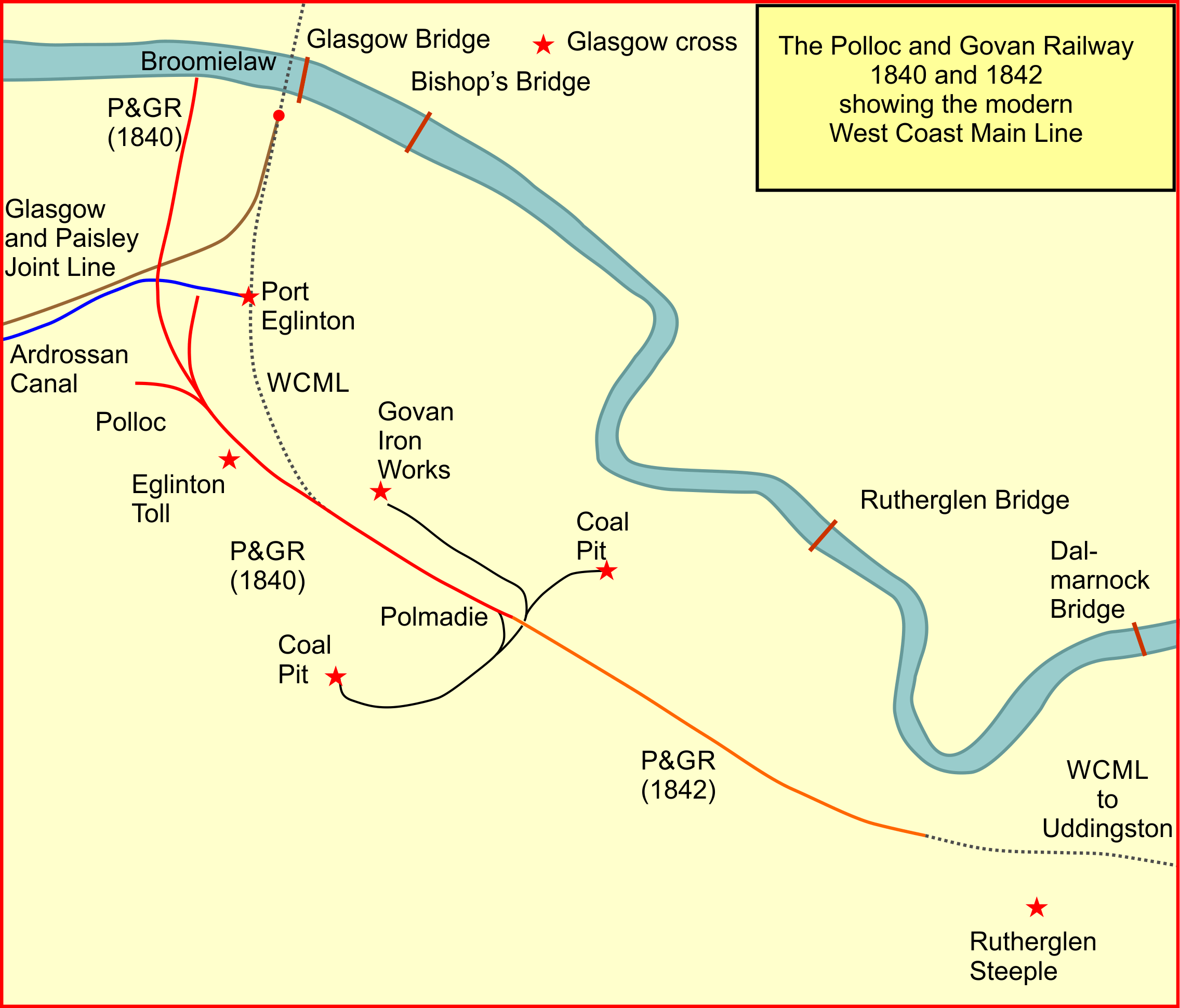
Polloc and Govan Railway system

Dixon later built an ironworks a little to the west of the Govan coal pit, in the area immediately east of the point where Cathcart Road crosses the M74. From the flames issuing from the furnaces the works became known as Dixon's Blazes. The Govan coal pits had expanded with surface equipment over a wide area; the ironworks was connected to the pits by local tramways, but the coal and iron needed to transported further afield. The Govan Waggonway, with wooden rails and horse traction, was technologically inadequate. By 1830 railways using stone block sleepers and cast iron rails were well established technology, and Dixon commissioned Thomas Grainger and John Miller to design a conversion of his waggonway to a railway. Grainger and Miller had been responsible for several of the "coal railways" in central Scotland, notably the Monkland and Kirkintilloch Railway, opened in 1826. The track gauge was 4 ft 6in, which Grainger and Miller had adopted on most of the other lines.

Polloc and Govan Railway Act 1830
- Act of Parliament
- Parliament of the United Kingdom
- Long title: An Act for making and maintaining a Railway from the Lands of Polloc and Govan to the River Clyde, at the Harbour of Broomielaw, in the County of Lanark, with a Branch to communicate therefrom.
- Citation: 11 Geo. 4 & 1 Will. 4. c. lxii

Dates
- Royal assent: 29 May 1830

Text of statute as originally enacted

On 29 May 1830, the Polloc and Govan Railway was authorised as a public company by an act of Parliament, the Polloc and Govan Railway Act 1830 (11 Geo. 4 & 1 Will. 4. c. lxii), with capital of £10,000 and authorised borrowing of £5,000.

At the eastern end the terminal was in lands in the ownership of the Trustees of Hutcheson's Hospital, (Note: Hutcheson's Hospital was a wealthy charitable institution. It was not a medical hospital, but gave shelter and food to the elderly poor and to orphans. It had several buildings; the principal one was in Ingram Street in what is now the Merchant City; and there was a school in Upper Crown Street. The Foundation had extensive lands elsewhere, and the reference here is to mineral bearing land near Polmadie House.) "whereby the fair advantage which the measure was calculated to produce might be secured to the institution". Robertson also shows a short westward spur from Eglinton Street towards Shields Bridge; this is referred to as the "Polloc Estate branch" by Robertson. The total length of the lines authorised was 0.85 miles (main line) and 0.34 miles (branches), a total of nearly 2 km.

== The line opens ==
Polloc and Govan Railway Act 1831
- Act of Parliament
- Parliament of the United Kingdom
- Long title: An Act for amending an Act passed in the Eleventh Year of the Reign of His late Majesty King George the Fourth, for making and maintaining a Railway from the Lands of Polloc and Govan to the River Clyde; and to alter and extend the Powers of the Company of Proprietors of the said Railway.
- Citation: 1 & 2 Will. 4. c. lviii

Dates
- Royal assent: 23 August 1831

Text of statute as originally enacted

Polloc and Govan Railway Act 1837
- Act of Parliament
- Parliament of the United Kingdom
- Long title: An Act to continue, for certain Purposes, the Powers of Two Acts for making and maintaining the Polloc and Govan Railway.
- Citation: 7 Will. 4 & 1 Vict. c. cxviii

Dates
- Royal assent: 15 July 1837

The line opened on 22 August 1840, "from Rutherglen to the Broomielaw Harbour", after two further acts of Parliament were obtained, the Polloc and Govan Railway Act 1831 (1 & 2 Will. 4. c. lviii) and the Polloc and Govan Railway Act 1837 (7 Will. 4 & 1 Vict. c. cxviii), authorising considerably more capital: £36,000 in share value. Cobb suggests that the 1840 opening was from Polmadie Bridge, i.e. Dixon's ironworks and coalpits, with an eastward extension to a station at Rutherglen in 1842.

== Locomotives ==
Polloc and Govan Railway Locomotives 1842–1848
Name	Wheel Arrangement	Foundry	Built	Notes
Polloc	0-4-0	J M Rowan & Co	1842	Caledonian Railway No 83
Govan	0-4-0	J M Rowan & Co	1842	Caledonian Railway No 84
Tradeston	0-4-0	J M Rowan & Co	1842	Caledonian Railway No 85

== The Clydesdale Junction Railway ==
The Caledonian Railway (CR) opened its main line from Glasgow in 1849; the route was from Townhead over the Glasgow, Garnkirk and Coatbridge Railway (GG&CR), an extended successor to the earlier Garnkirk and Glasgow Railway, which had been built as a coal line. The GG&CR had been upgraded but the route was roundabout. A shorter route between Motherwell and Glasgow had been promoted earlier; it obtained authority by an act of Parliament, the Clydesdale Junction Railway Act 1845 (8 & 9 Vict. c. clx), on 31 July 1845, and was called the Clydesdale Junction Railway. The CR made provisional arrangements to lease the Polloc and Govan line on 29 January 1845, and soon afterwards to lease the Clydesdale Junction line itself. The CR purchased the Polloc and Govan Railway on 18 August 1846, and William Dixon received 2,400 CR shares in payment. (Note: Although the company had been authorised by Parliament, it was nonetheless wholly owned by Dixon; see Robertson, page 96, and Ross, page 37.) The CR upgraded the Polloc and Govan and regauged it to standard gauge, and used its alignment for part of the route: it formed an end-on junction with the line at Rutherglen. At Eglinton Street the new line diverged to the north and terminated at the Southside railway station, which was shared with the Glasgow, Barrhead and Neilston Direct Railway.

On 30 March 1849 the General Terminus opened; it was a large goods handling depot on the River Clyde, immediately to the west of the Polloc and Govan's "Broomielaw" terminal at Windmillcroft, and superseding it. The obsolete rails in West Street remained in place for another eighteen years: on 14 March 1867 an act of Parliament was obtained to lift part of the line, in West Street to the River Clyde.

The Clydesdale Junction Railway and the Polloc and Goven Railway were absorbed by the Caledonian Railway by the Caledonian, Polloc and Govan, and Clydesdale Junction Railways Amalgamation Act 1846 (9 & 10 Vict. c. ccclxxix).

== Links to other lines ==
- Clydesdale Junction Railway. End to end link made:
- General Terminus and Glasgow Harbour Railway
