= Glasgow and Paisley Joint Railway =

UK railway line

Overview
- Locale: Scotland
- Dates of operation: September 1840–31 December 1922
- Successor: London, Midland and Scottish Railway

Technical
- Track gauge: 1,435 mm (4 ft 8 1/2 in)

The Glasgow and Paisley Joint Railway was the section of railway line between Glasgow Bridge Street railway station and Paisley, in the west of Scotland. It was constructed and operated jointly by two competing railway companies as the stem of their lines to Greenock and Ayr respectively, and it opened in 1840. The Joint Committee, which controlled the line, built a branch to Govan and later to Cessnock Dock, and then Prince's Dock.

With the passing of the Railways Act 1921 (Grouping Act) the line, together with the Caledonian Railway and the Glasgow and South Western Railway, became part of the London, Midland and Scottish Railway (LMS).

The line is still in heavy use today as the eastern end of the Inverclyde Line and the Ayrshire Coast Line.

== Formation ==
In the 1830s promoters in the west of Scotland considered the potential for railway construction, and in the 1837 parliamentary session, supporters of two schemes presented bills. One scheme was to build from Glasgow to Greenock, and the other from Glasgow to Ayr with a branch to Kilmarnock. Both wished to start from a Glasgow terminus at Bridge Street, and their proposed course as far as Paisley was almost identical. At the time Parliament was hostile to permitting closely parallel construction, and it became clear that the only way forward was to combine to build and use a shared line as far as Paisley. The acts of Parliament – the Glasgow, Paisley and Greenock Railway Act 1837 (7 Will. 4 & 1 Vict. c. cxvi) and Glasgow, Paisley, Kilmarnock and Ayr Railway Act 1837 (7 Will. 4 & 1 Vict. c. cxvii) – for the two schemes received royal assent on 15 July 1837, and the new companies were called the Glasgow, Paisley and Greenock Railway (GP&GR) and the Glasgow, Paisley, Kilmarnock and Ayr Railway (GPK&AR).

The GPK&AR opened a section at its southern end on 19 July 1839 between Irvine and Ayr (Newton-on-Ayr), and it started operation on the Joint Line on 14 July 1840 from a temporary station at Glasgow (Bridge Street) to Paisley. The GP&GR opened in March 1841, having been delayed due to the difficulties in the construction of the tunnel at Bishopton.

== Status of the joint line ==
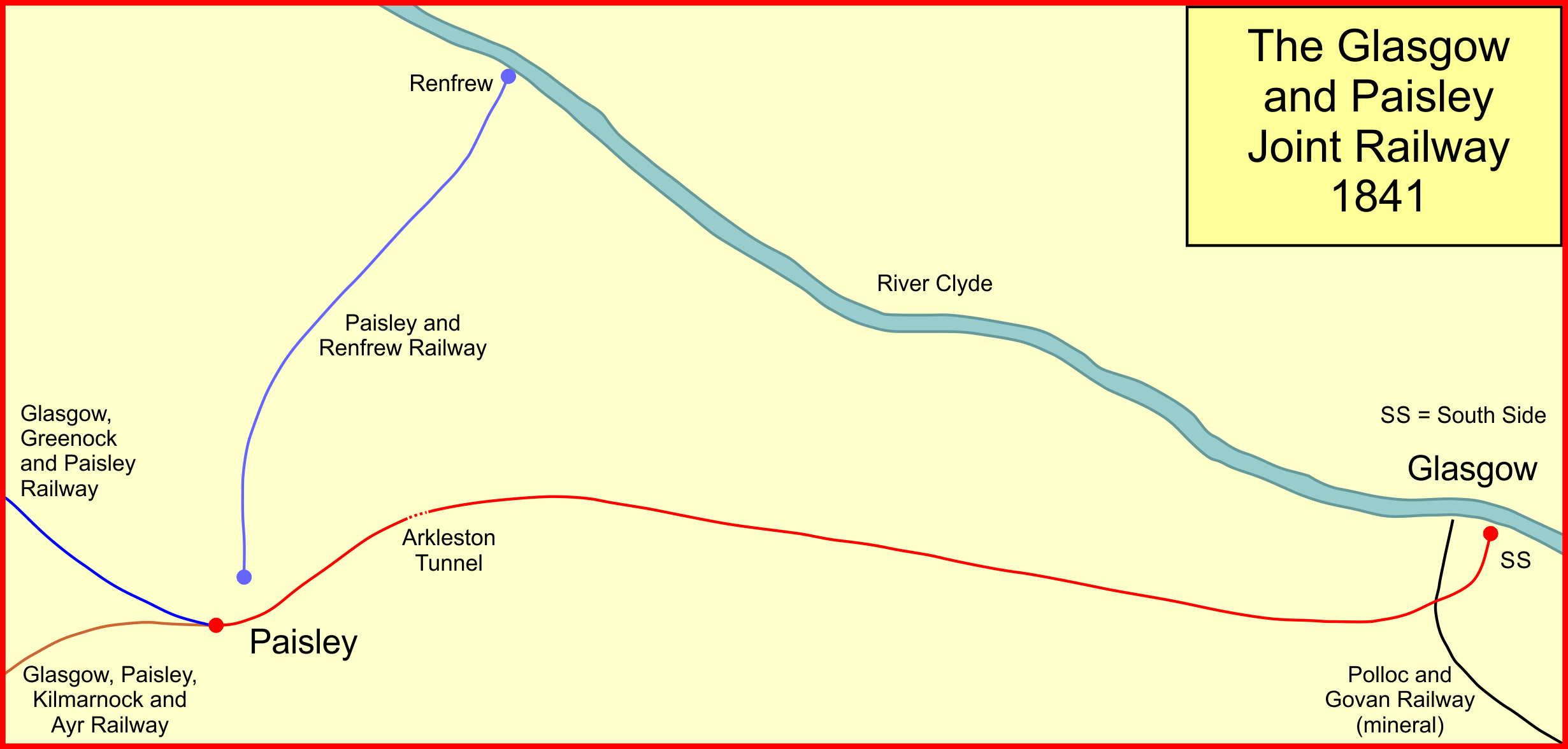
System map of the Glasgow and Paisley Joint Railway in 1841

There was never a Glasgow and Paisley Joint Railway Company; the Joint Line was managed separately from the other parts of the two owning companies, and managed by a Joint Committee. Some authors have referred to "the Joint Railway" and this has sometimes been taken to imply company status, but that is erroneous.

== Glasgow extensions and service redirections ==
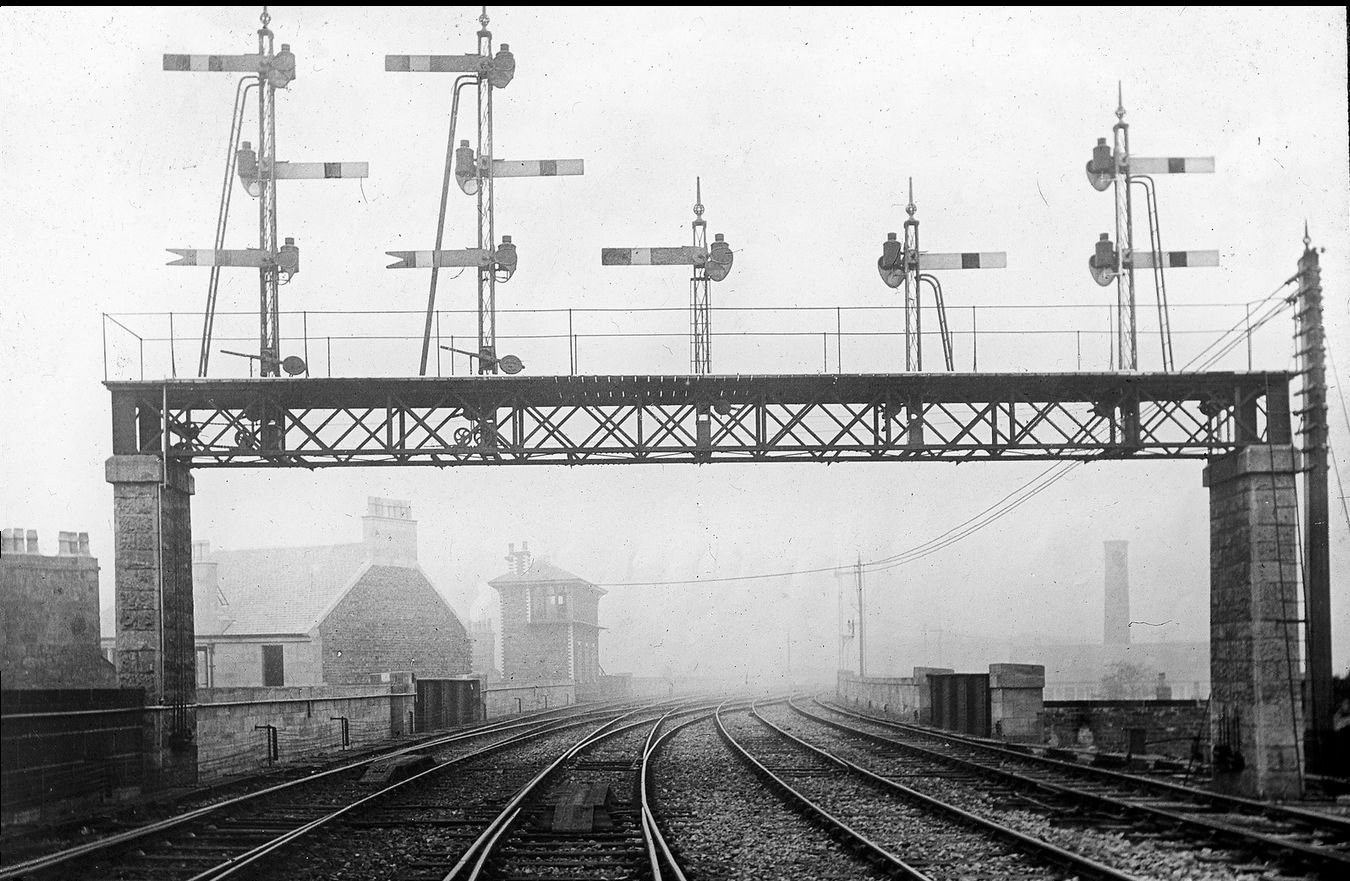
Wallneuk Junction signal gantry Paisley

In 1840 the Bridge Street terminus on Clyde Place was adequate; it was a temporary station, replaced by the imposing permanent structure on 6 April 1841, handling passengers and goods. However, as traffic grew, although it was enlarged, its shortcomings became obvious, and its location on the south side of the River Clyde was seen as a disadvantage.

The GPK&AR had merged with the Glasgow, Dumfries and Carlisle Railway and become the Glasgow and South Western Railway (G&SWR) in 1850, and in 1876 it opened a new Glasgow passenger terminus called St Enoch. The site is nowadays largely subsumed in the St Enoch shopping centre. The new terminal was accessed over the City of Glasgow Union Railway, diverging (considered approaching Glasgow) at Shields Junction and crossing the Clyde at the Union Railway Bridge. St Enoch station became the main Glasgow passenger terminal for the G&SWR, although they continued to use Bridge Street for some time.

The Caledonian Railway (CR) became the successor to the Glasgow Paisley and Greenock Railway, and it too wished build a larger passenger terminal on the north side of the Clyde; on 31 July 1879, the CR opened a new terminus called Glasgow Central, fronting Gordon Street; the line was extended across the Clyde from Bridge Street on a four-track bridge built by Sir William Arrol & Co. Bridge Street station was also improved to include two new through platforms leading to Central Station and four bay platforms: two for the CR and two for the G&SWR.

With the opening of Dunlop Street station on the City Union Line on 12 December 1870, the G&SWR had a much more convenient central terminal in Glasgow, and the inconvenient station at Bridge Street was no longer an asset. The G&SWR ceased using it on 1 February 1892, and "the Joint Line now started at the bridge over Cook Street and its mileposts had to be reset for the purpose of mileage calculations."

Central Station was improved and extended in the period 1901 to 1905, and an additional eight-track bridge built over the Clyde. Bridge Street station was closed in 1905 and the site was used as carriage sidings.

== Govan branch ==
A branch was promoted by the Joint Committee to Govan, from Ibrox. It opened to goods traffic on 1 May 1868 and to passengers on 2 December 1868. As an inner-suburban line, it was vulnerable to tramcar competition, and the passenger service was withdrawn on 9 May 1921.

== Princes Dock branch ==
The joint committee had obtained acts of Parliament in 1891 and 1894 to build a line off the Govan branch to the Cessnock Dock then being planned by the Clyde Trustees. In June 1897 an agreement was made with the North British Railway (NBR) so that they could participate in the construction and operation, and this was finalised in June 1897. The Clyde Navigation Act 1899 vested the new line in the Joint Committee from 9 August 1899.

The line opened in 1903, retitled the Princes Dock Railway; it was heavily used by the NBR.

== Renfrew District Railway ==
The Renfrew District Railway opened on 1 June 1903. It left the Joint Line's Shieldhall branch, crossing the G&SWR Renfrew branch near Renfrew, then running south alongside it to a terminus at Renfrew (Porterfield). At first the passenger service was operated alternately each half year by the CR and the G&SWR, but from 1907 the G&SWR ran all the passenger trains, using St Enoch station in Glasgow. In 1916 a connection was installed near Porterfield joining it with the Renfrew branch.

== Quadruple tracks ==
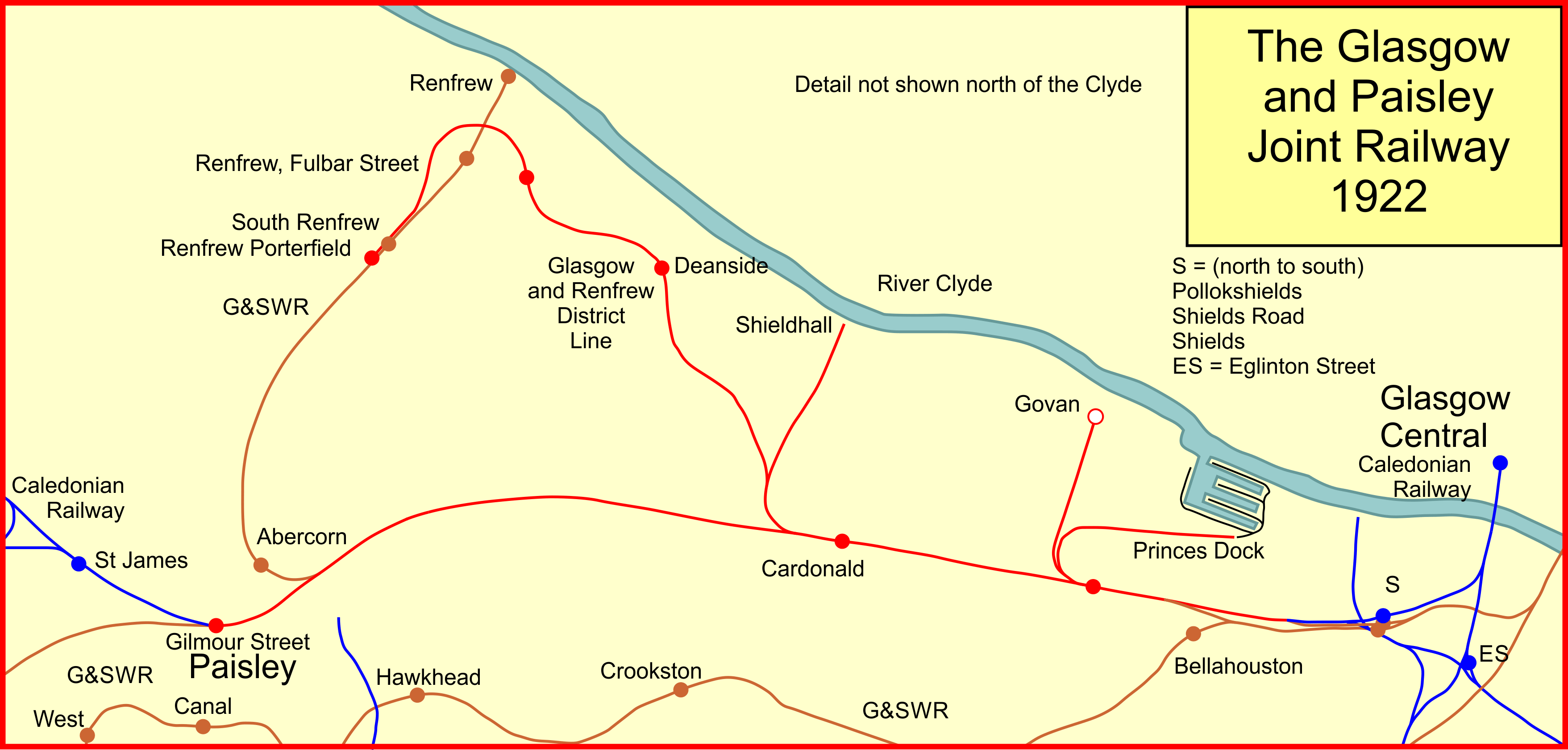
System map of the Glasgow and Paisley Joint Railway in 1922

In the 1880s the main section of the joint line between Bridge Street station and Paisley Gilmour Street station was increased to four tracks. The work involved the opening out of the Arkleston Tunnel, which was reported as being carried out in 1882. 260 trains used the section daily at that time—300 in the peak summer period.

British Rail later reduced the section between Shields and Arkleston Junctions to two tracks again in the mid-1960s, as part of the resignalling and electrification of the line towards Gourock, and further removed the slow lines between Arkleston Junction and Wallneuk Junction (the point of divergence of the Ayr line and the Gourock line) during the 1980s Ayrshire Coast electrification.

== Present day: Inverclyde and Ayrshire Coast lines ==
The joint line remains important today as part of the heavily-trafficked Inverclyde and Ayrshire Coast lines. It was additionally proposed in the mid-2000s that the line would form part of the Glasgow Airport Rail Link between Glasgow Central station and Glasgow Airport, and plans for the link were approved by the Scottish Parliament in 2007. These plans included a number of capacity enhancements for the joint line in order to allow for the extra trains that would serve the airport, including the provision of a bi-directional third track in the centre of the existing two tracks between Shields and Arkleston Junctions, the restoration of the four-track layout between Arkleston and Wallneuk Junctions, and extensive replacement of life-expired signalling along the whole line. Although the airport link itself was subsequently cancelled in 2009 as a result of public spending cuts, the joint line works were continued as the Paisley Corridor Improvements Project and completed in 2012.

== Accidents ==
=== 1855 tail end collision ===
On 22 February 1855 the 6.00 a.m. Dumfries to Glasgow train was brought to a stand on the Joint Line by a derailment due to a broken tyre. One of the passenger coaches had its doors locked, and before the guard could release the occupants, the 9.15 a.m. Greenock to Glasgow train ran into the rear of the train. One person was killed and several were injured. It was stated at the inquiry that the Joint Committee had issued no printed operating instructions.

The Dumfries train started braking when it had just passed under the Paisley Road bridge (nowadays the A761 road). When it stopped the guard attempted to unlock the doors of an overturned coach, and a platelayer started back to warn any following train.

A "policeman" (i.e. a railway employee stationed to control a level crossing and regulate trains) was on duty at Berryknowes Road level crossing, and he had exhibited a green hand signal, meaning "caution", to the driver of the Greenock train. The driver shut off steam but evidently continued coasting, and following the Dumfries train closely, he saw the platelayer's warning too late, and collided with the Dumfries train.

The two trains were scheduled to leave Paisley at a two-minute interval, and the Dumfries train was slower. There were no printed instructions for Joint Line employees about the safe working, and the Secretary to the Railway Department of the Board of Trade wrote:

My Lords [of the Board of Trade] direct me to observe that the absence of written or printed instructions, especially with respect to the starting of the trams, and the intervals to be observed between them, is more than ordinarily dangerous upon a line of railway traversed by trains belonging to different Railway Companies.

=== 1882 collision ===
A signalman's error led to a collision at Penilee, at the west end of the present Hillington West station, on the afternoon of 9 September 1880, not long after the commissioning of the four-track layout.

A mineral train from Hurlford to Glasgow was plodding along the Up Goods Line. It was a heavy train, with a lot of pig iron. The engine was no. 139, an 0-4-2 of Patrick Stirling's design ... Two Hurlford men were in charge, driver James Lauderdale and fireman Andrew Gilchrist ... They got to Penilee and were held at the starter, for a ballast was working in the section to Cardonald. After about twelve minutes, the Penilee signalman waved them back, intending to put them on to the Up Passenger Line, to resume their journey on that. The man was tired at the end of a long shift, probably rather strange to the new set-up. By some incredible error he opened not one crossover, but two, and the train propelled back on to the Up Passenger and then on to the Down Passenger! The signalman then restored his levers and pulled off for the 4 o'clock Caley express Glasgow to Greenock.

Jimmy Lauderdale, on 139, was a bit puzzled by all this. But they were all new to the four-track, and he supposed it was all right. Then the signalman gave them a green flag from the box, so Lauderdale started pulling forward to see what he wanted. But the guard had spotted the down signals all off; thoroughly alarmed, he began running forward and shouting, and presently Lauderdale heard him and stopped. But it was too late then to do anything. The express was 200 yards away, coming 40 miles an hour. No. 139's crew cleared out and went over the wall, and the express went head on into 139. It was quite a bad smash. The guard and two passengers were killed. The fireman and another passenger died later. The driver escaped with severe bruising. There was very nearly another collision immediately after, for a Caley mineral from Lesmahagow was coming on the Down Goods line. Its driver saw the crash occur and managed to pull up just in time.

=== Post nationalisation accidents ===
There was an accident to the west side of Shields Junction on 30 August 1973 when an Inverclyde Line service from Wemyss Bay to Glasgow Central crashed into the rear of an Ayrshire Coast Line service from Ayr which was just starting away from a signal.

The western end of the line was the scene of a railway accident, on 16 April 1979, when an Inverclyde Line service from Glasgow Central to Wemyss Bay crossed from the Down Fast Line to the Down Gourock Line at Wallneuk Junction, immediately to the east of Paisley Gilmour Street railway station. It collided head-on with an Ayrshire Coast Line special service from Ayr, which had left Platform 2 against a red signal.

== Connections to other lines ==
- At Shields Junction to City of Glasgow Union Railway
- At Shields Junction to General Terminus and Glasgow Harbour Railway
- At Shields Junction to G&SWR Paisley Canal Branch
- At Shields Junction to Polloc and Govan Railway
- At Ibrox to the Govan Branch of Glasgow and Paisley Joint Railway
- At Ibrox to the Princes Dock Joint Railway
- At Cardonald to Glasgow and Renfrew District Railway
- At Paisley Gilmour Street to Glasgow, Paisley and Greenock Railway
- At Paisley Gilmour Street to Glasgow, Paisley, Kilmarnock and Ayr Railway

== See also ==
- Ayrshire Coast Line
- Glasgow Airport Rail Link
- Inverclyde Line

== Sources ==
- Awdry, Christopher (1990). Encyclopaedia of British Railway Companies. Sparkford: Patrick Stephens Ltd. ISBN 1-8526-0049-7. OCLC 19514063. CN 8983.
- Butt, R. V. J. (October 1995). The Directory of Railway Stations: details every public and private passenger station, halt, platform and stopping place, past and present (1st ed.). Sparkford: Patrick Stephens Ltd. ISBN 978-1-85260-508-7. OCLC 60251199. OL 11956311M.
- Casserley, H. C. (1968). Britain's Joint Lines. London: Ian Allan. ISBN 0-7110-0024-7.
- Jowett, Alan (March 1989). Jowett's Railway Atlas of Great Britain and Ireland: From Pre-Grouping to the Present Day (1st ed.). Sparkford: Patrick Stephens Ltd. ISBN 978-1-85260-086-0. OCLC 22311137.
- Hall, Stanley (1999). Hidden Dangers: Railway Safety in the Era of Privatisation. Shepperton: Ian Allan. ISBN 0-7110-2679-3.
- Robertson, C. J. A. (1983). The Origins of the Scottish Railway System: 1722-1844 (1st ed.). Edinburgh: John Donald Publishers Ltd. ISBN 0-8597-6088-X.
- Thomas, John (Introduction) (n.d.) [post-1977 and pre-1982]. Smith, W. A. C. (compiler) (ed.). Rails Around Glasgow. Paisley: Scottish Steam Railtours Group. ISBN 0-9506-9090-2.
- Thomas, John (1971). A Regional History of the Railways of Great Britain. Vol. VI Scotland: The Lowlands and the Borders (1st ed.). Newton Abbot, Devon: David & Charles. ISBN 0-7153-5408-6. OCLC 16198685.
- Thomas, John; Paterson, Rev A. J. S. (1984). A Regional History of the Railways of Great Britain. Vol. VI Scotland: The Lowlands and the Borders (2nd ed.). Newton Abbott, Devon: David & Charles. ISBN 0-9465-3712-7. OCLC 12521072.
