= Dunlop Hill =

Hill in East Ayrshire, Scotland

Coordinates: 55.7119°N 4.5448°W

Dunlop hill is a hill in Dunlop, East Ayrshire which is believed to have once held a Celtic fortress. Unknown in age, it is probably a few thousand years old. For members of the Dunlop family, it is a legend that has been believed for centuries.
