= Clan Dunlop =

Scottish clan

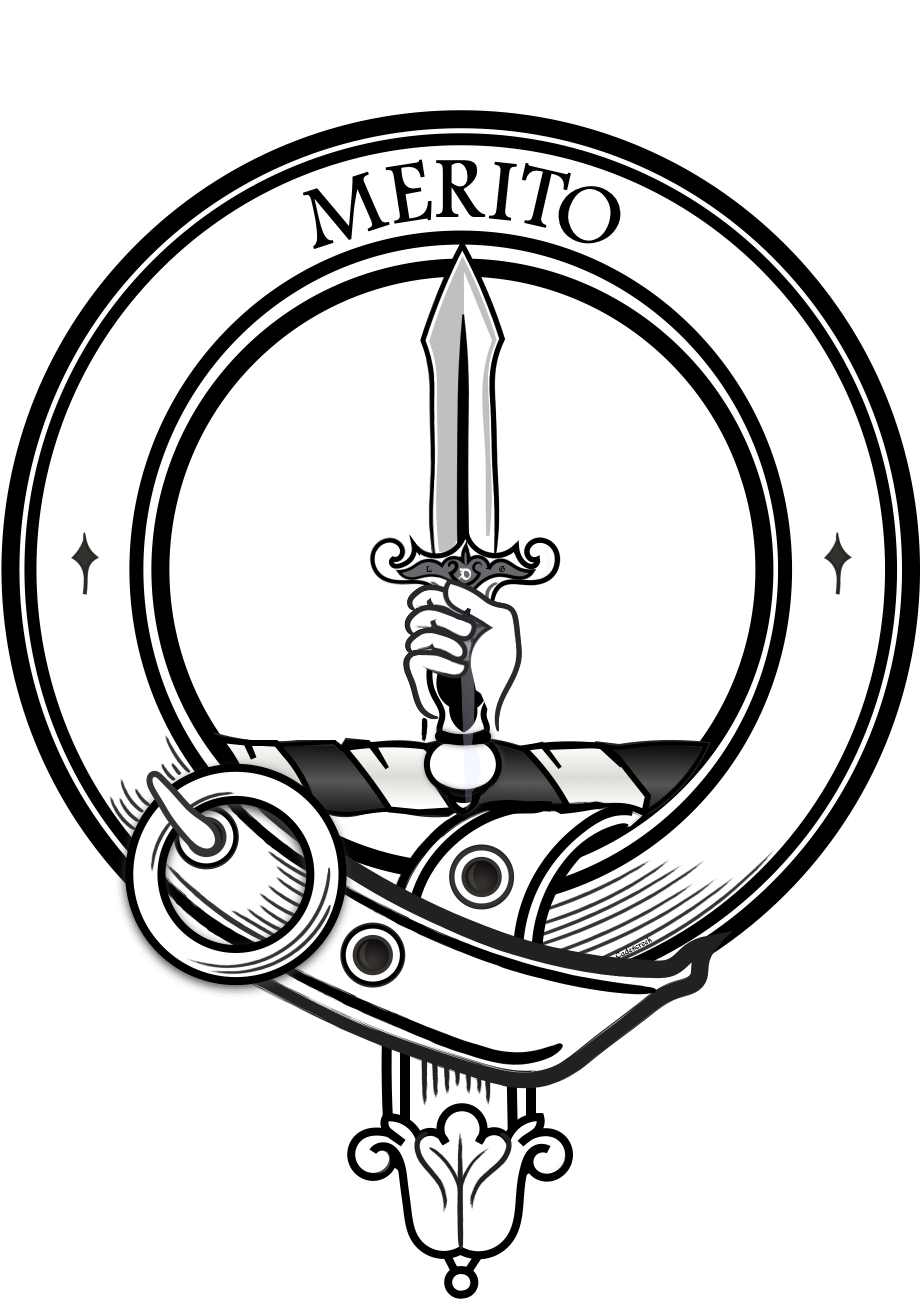
- Crest: A dexter hand holding a dagger erect all Proper
- Motto: Merito [Latin, 'Deservedly'] and E spinis, which translates from Latin as "From the thorns"

Profile
- Region: Scottish Lowlands
- District: Cunningham

Chief
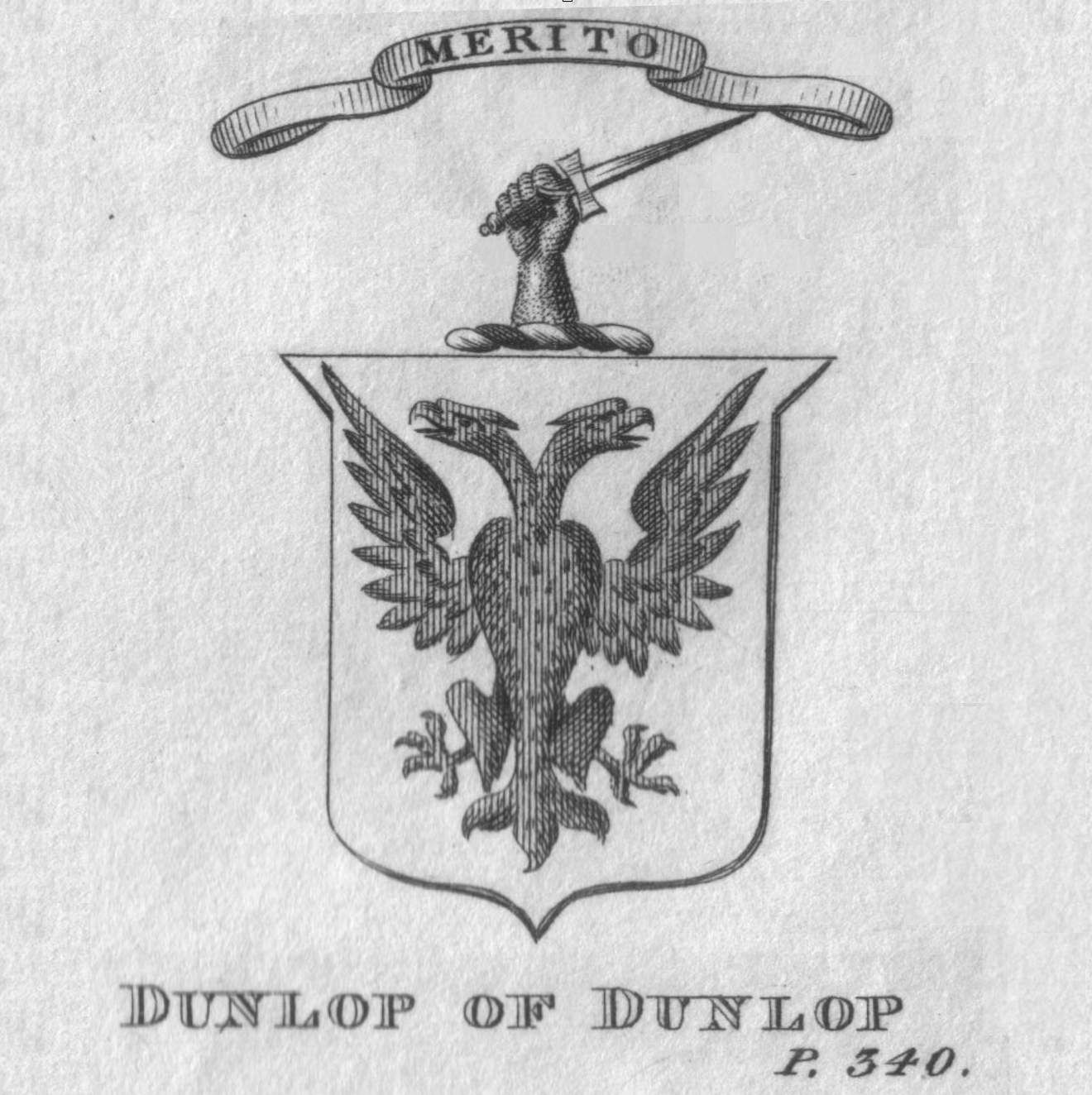
- James Stuart Wallace Dunlop, 30th of that Ilk and Current Chief of the Name
- Seat: Dunlop, in Cunningham, Ayrshire
- Historic seat: Dunlop Castle
Septs of Clan Dunlop
DELAP DULAP DULLOP DUNLAP DUNLOP
Allied clans
Clan Cunningham
Clan Hamilton
Clan Brown of the Cunningham district
Clan Wallace

The Dunlops were a landed family of nobility from the western region of Scotland, known for their historical influence and its strong association with the Gaelic-speaking culture of Scotland. The family has roots in ancient Scottish traditions and has been recognized for its role in the developing Scotland’s heritage over the centuries.

== Clan status ==
Clan Dunlop is considered an Armigerous Clan because although James Stuart Wallace Dunlop holds the title of Chief within the family and is considered to be the current head of the clan — Clan Dunlop is lacking a recognized chief in the formal heraldic sense (officially recognized by the Court of the Lord Lyon — the official heraldic authority in Scotland). However, the family has a distinct heritage and history hailing from the Kingdom of Strathclyde, as well as an established tartan, coat of arms, badge, and a coat of arms which IS acknowledged by the Court of the Lord Lyon.

== Etymology ==
The surname Dunlop is believed to be of Gaelic origin, derived from the place name Dun Lobb, meaning "fort (or strong place) of the hill or bend," or Dun Lòb, referring to a fortified hill in the area. This etymology reflects the geographical features of the area where the clan was established.

The Dunlop family is thought to have originated from the area around Dunlop, North Ayrshire, where the Dunlop Castle once stood. The clan is believed to have been one of the early settlers in the region, and over time it became associated with the powerful and influential families in the area.

== Early history ==
The family played a role in the early political developments of Scotland. The Dunlops were initially part of the larger network of Scottish Gaelic tribes that held lands in the Kingdom of Strathclyde before the Scots consolidated their power. The Dunlop family was connected with the surrounding noble houses, and its members were involved in various land transactions and feudal duties.

The earliest known recorded mention of Clan Dunlop likely dates back to the 1200s where the Dunlap name was recorded on government documents. About this same time there are several additional findings of the surname on other documents relevant to the Dunlop family history.

== Castle and seat ==
Dunlop Castle, (aka Hunthall) located near the village of Dunlop, is considered the traditional seat of the clan. The castle was built in the 13th century by the Dunlop family and was strategically positioned on a hill overlooking the surrounding land.

This structure was described as an important fortification in the region, though it no longer stands today. The Dunlop family was responsible for much of the area's local governance and played an important role in the region’s medieval politics.

== Coat of arms ==
There seem to be several variations of the Dunlop Coat of Arms, however, the predominant theme features a two-headed eagle. The family's heraldic blazon for their coat of arms is generally described by Burke's Peerage in the following categories and styles:

Paraphrased Descriptions and Explanations of the Coat of Arms through the Centuries
Style	Description
Dunlop, of County Ayr.	Argent (silver/metal) a two-headed eagle displayed Gules (red)
(1838) Dunlop;	As the last, for Dunlop; 2nd and 3rd, counter-quartered, 1st and 4th, Gules a lion Rampant (on one hind foot and prepared to battle). Argent; 2nd and 3rd, Gules a fess (horizontal band) chequy (checkered) Argent And Azure (blue), all for Wallace. Crest — a dexter (The right-hand side of the shield from the standpoint of the man behind it) hand holding a dagger erected (upright, in a vertical position) all proper (in natural or normal colors). Motto — "Merito."
(1672) Dunlop, of County Ayr	Argent: A two-headed eagle displayed Gules in dexter chief point a mullet azure for difference. Crest — a rose slipped (appearing with a stem) proper (In natural or normal colors) Motto — "E spinis."
(1779) Carmyle and Garnkirk	Argent: A two-headed eagle displayed Gules in dexter chief a rose of the last, (ff the same tincture or color as the last previously mentioned color) a bordure (narrow border) Azure. Crest — a dexter hand holding a dagger in bend (direction of) sinister (the left-hand side of the shield from the standpoint of the man behind it) proper. Mottoes — Above the crest: "Merito"; beneath the shield: "E spinis."
(1792) Rosebank, of County Lanark	Argent: A two-headed eagle displayed Gules beaked (of the beaks of birds or monsters) and membered Sable (black) in chief (upper part of a field aka surface divided i.e., a quarter) a lozenge (diamond) between two stars Azure. In base (lower part of a field) the sea waved (unknown) Vert (green) in dexter chief a rose of the last, a bordure Azure Crest — a hand holding a sword proper. Motto — "Merito."
(1672) Househill	Argent: A two-headed eagle displayed Gules in dexter chief point (top of the shield) a martlet (bird resembling a house-martin, with its leg feathers but no legs) Azure for difference. Crest — a hand holding a sword proper. Motto — "Merito."

== Mottoes ==
The Clan Dunlop's primary motto is "Merito" which means "Deservedly"; and E spinis which translates to "From the thorns." This reflects the clan's resilient warrior spirit and the tenacity of its members throughout history.

== Tartans ==
The clan's tartan is distinctive, and characterized by a pattern of blue and black that signify their Scottish heritage.

The first Dunlop Tartan was based upon the red and black tartan of our family's allied clan — the Cunninghams, however with minor details altered. Later, two additional tartans for "Dunlop Dress" (STA Ref/STWR Ref 1784) and "Dunlop Hunting" (STA Ref/STWR Ref 1205) were successfully approved.

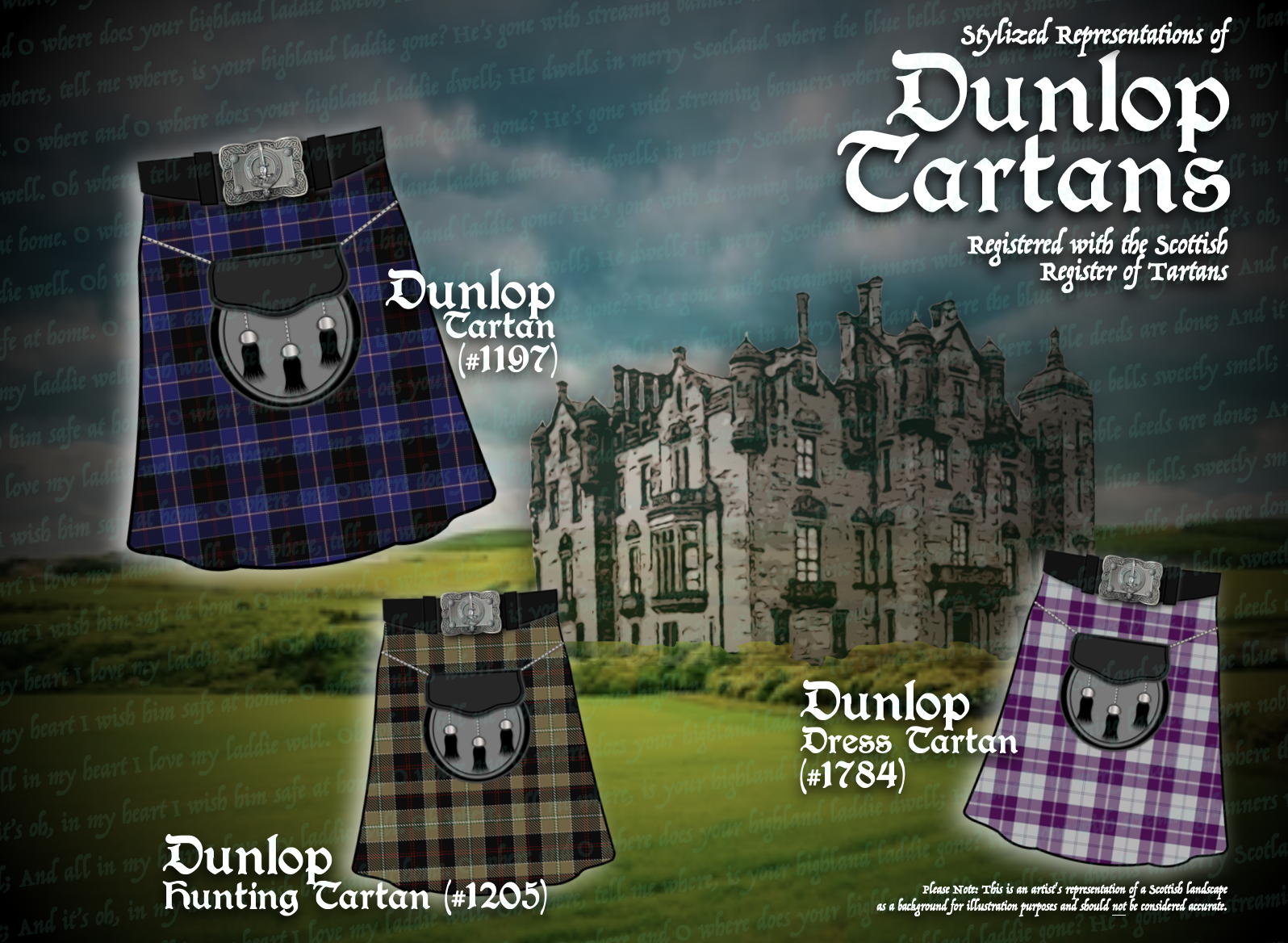
An artist's concept of the three registered Dunlop Tartans with a Scottish Landscape background. The patterns are accurate, however everything else is for illustration purposes only.

Several dedicated Dunlop descendants worked diligently to help create the Dunlop Tartans. Richard Dunlop (hailing from Washington D.C.), was the second President of the Dunlop/Dunlap Family Society, and he was instrumental in undertaking the complicated and lengthy process of researching existing tartans, and then finding the path forward for designing, seeking approval, and registering the proposed tartans.

=== Scottish Register of Tartans (SRT) 1045 Registration Notes ===
The Scottish Register of Tartans (SRT) for the "Dunlop" tartan is as follows:

In 1974, Richard Dunlop, of Washington DC, the second President of the Dunlop Family Clan Society set out to establish a clan tartan for Dunlop. This was achieved in 1982 and #1197 (original Scottish Tartans Authority reference) was unveiled at Grandfather Mountain Games in that year. Two years later the hunting and dress were finalised. The design appears to have been a joint effort between Richard Dunlop and Charles Thompson. Samples in Scottish Tartans Authority Dalgety Collection. Woven by House of Edgar & Lochcarron. Count changed in March 2005 to accord with Scottish Tartans Society documentation of Nov. 1983.

Dunlop Tartan #1045 Details
STA Ref:	1197 (Scottish Tartans Authority)
STWR Ref:	1197 (Scottish Tartans World Register)
Designer:	Unspecified
Tartan Date:	01/01/1982
Registration date:	Recorded prior to the launch of The Scottish Register of Tartans.
Category:	Clan/Family

Note: Where tartans were recorded before the establishment of the Scottish Register of Tartans (SRT) on 5 February 2009, the original Scottish Tartans Authority (STA) and the Scottish Tartans World Register (SRT) reference numbers have been retained.

The tartan is often worn during formal events, gatherings, and Highland games, symbolizing both pride and continuity of the Dunlop legacy.

== Notable members ==
The Dunlop family has produced several notable figures throughout Scottish history, including military leaders, scholars, and religious figures.

One well-known member of Clan Dunlop was Lieutenant General James Wallace Dunlop 21st of that Ilk (1759 – 1832), who was a Scottish land owner and key military officer during the Napoleonic Wars, where he distinguished himself as a commander. He also served in the American Revolutionary War and in India.

John Boyd Dunlop was a 19th-century inventor and entrepreneur from Scotland who is credited with the invention of the pneumatic tire, which revolutionized the automotive industry. His work has had a lasting impact on both transportation and engineering.

Colonel Weary Dunlop was an Australian surgeon who gained notoriety for his exceptional leadership after his stint as a POW held by Japanese captors during World War II.

== Clan today ==
There are various clan societies and associations around the world, particularly in regions with large Scottish diasporas such as the United States, Canada, and Australia. These societies focus on preserving the history and traditions of the clan, organizing events like clan gatherings, Highland games, and social functions to foster a sense of community among Dunlops worldwide.

== See also ==
- List of Scottish Clans
- Dunlop Baronets
- DunlOp (Surname)
- DunlAp (Surname)
- Of that Ilk
