= Halket Loch =

Coordinates: 55°44′15.9″N 4°31′21.3″W

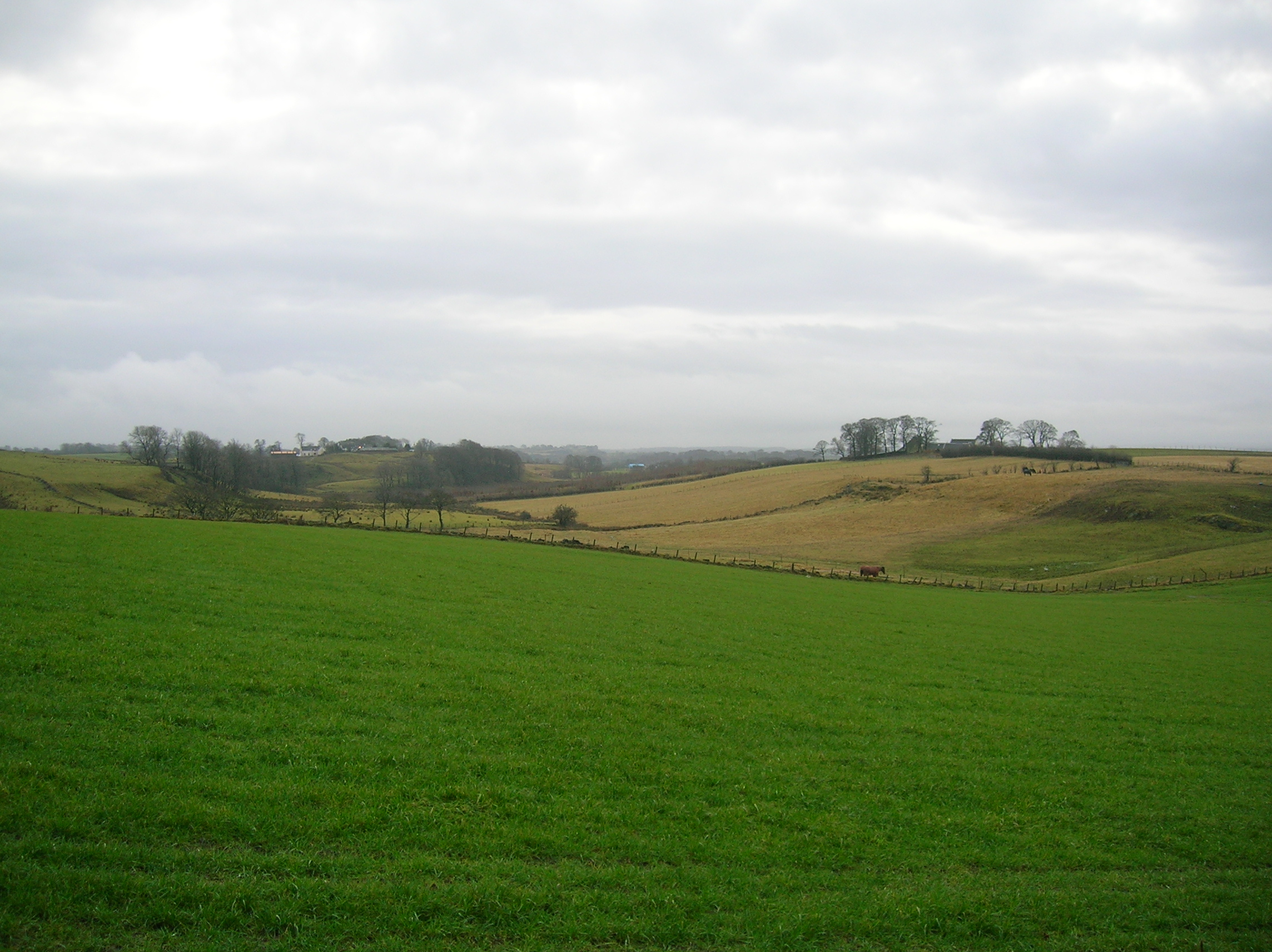
- The site of Halket Loch

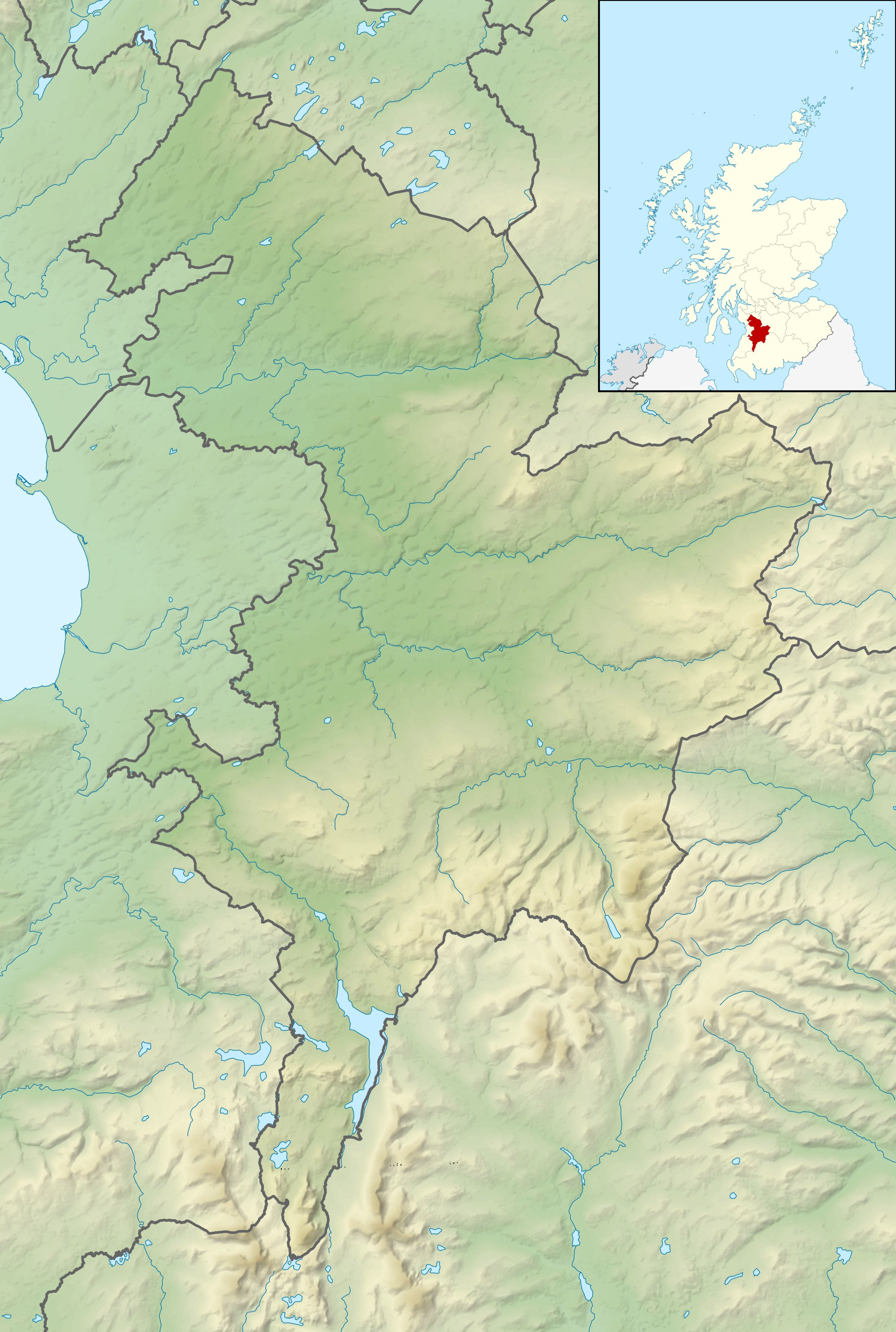
- Location within East Ayrshire
- Location: Lugton, East Ayrshire, Scotland
- Type: Drained freshwater loch
- Primary inflows: Rainfall and runoff
- Primary outflows: Glazert Water
- Basin countries: Scotland
- Surface area: 40,000 square metres (9.9 acres)
- Settlements: Lugton

Halket Loch also known as Halkhead or Halketh, was situated in the mid-Ayrshire clayland near Lugton. It is visible as a surface depression in pastureland, sometimes partially flooded, situated in a low-lying area close to farms and dwellings of East, North and Middle Halket and Craighead in the Parish of Dunlop, East Ayrshire, Scotland. The loch was natural, sitting in a hollow created by glaciation. The loch waters drained via the Glazert Water that joins the Annick Water.

== History ==
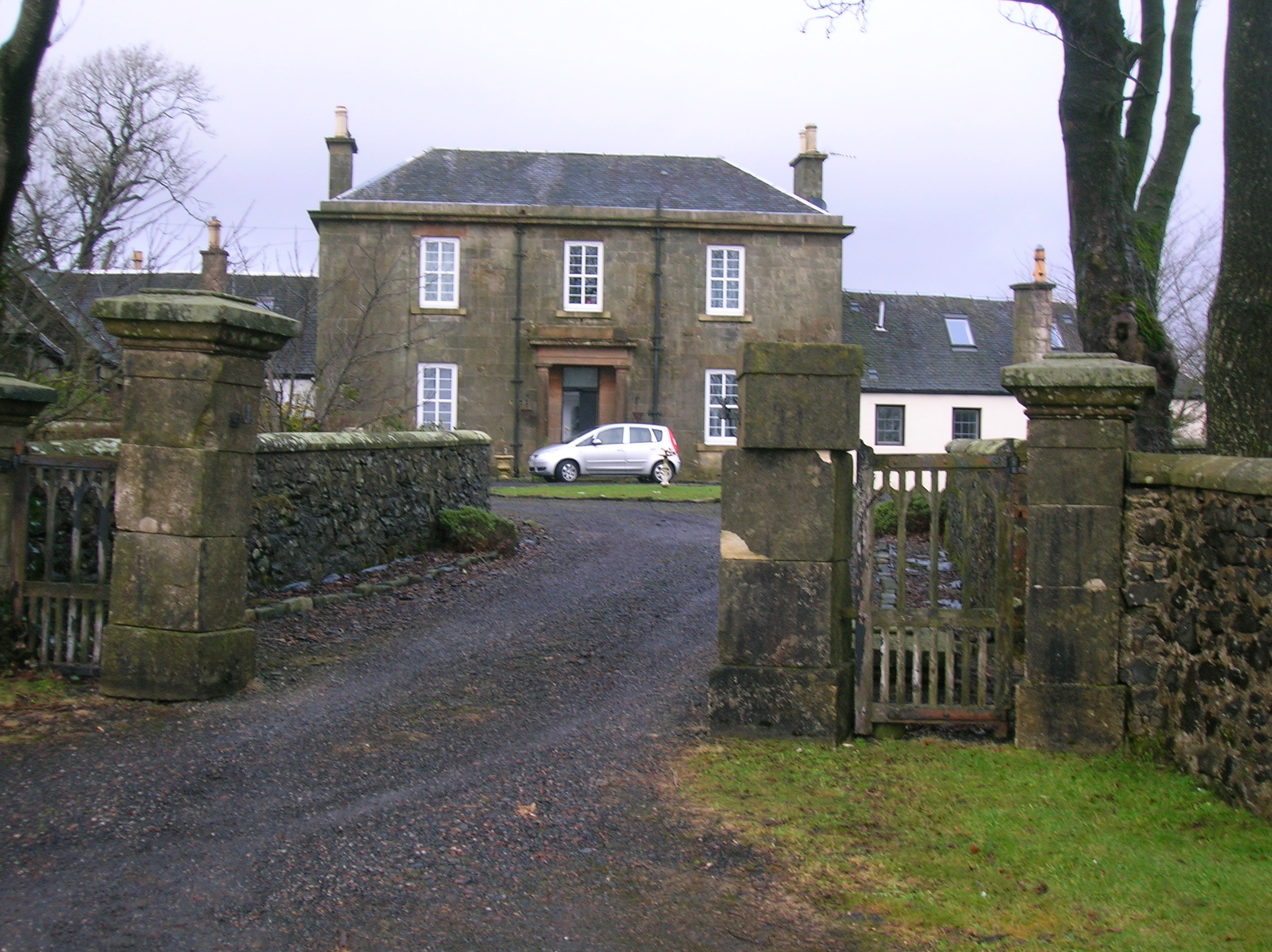
East Halket House

Gabriel Porterfield and his wife Jean Maxwell had a conjunct liferent of 'Halketh' and its loch on a charter of Robert Montgomerie of Hessilhead, dated 24 May 1634. In 1648 the loch was held by John Porterfield of Hapland, as heir to his father Gabriel. The loch was later inherited by his brother Alexander on 5 October 1653. The lands and Loch of Halket later lay within the Barony of Robertland as recorded by a charter under the Great Seal of 8 July 1676. Blaeu's map of 1654, based on Timothy Pont's work of the late 16th century, shows a 'Halkhead Loch', with a single property, Halkhead, nearby.

Halket was a post-glacial loch and lies beneath the prominent hill known as Craighead Law. Thomson's map of 1832 refers to the loch as 'Hawkhead'. Lochridgehills Farm, with its descriptive and indicative placename, lies near to shoreline at the site of the old Halket Loch.

=== Drainage ===
Crops in the area were greatly prone to mildew and this was one of the reasons for the demise of the loch. The loch was substantially drained in 1815 or 1830 The Glazert Water and the loch are marked on Thomson's map of 1828, however the outflow had been canalised by the time of the first Ordnance Survey of the mid 19th century, presumably as part of the loch drainage works. Paterson records that the cost of the loch drainage was shared between the surrounding proprietors and the creation of an excellent meadow was the outcome. Further drainage work may have taken place as part of the improvements undertaken to provide employment for Irish estate workers during the Irish potato famines of the mid 19th centuries. Many drainage schemes also date to the end of World War I when many soldiers returned en masse to civilian life.

=== Craighead Law ===
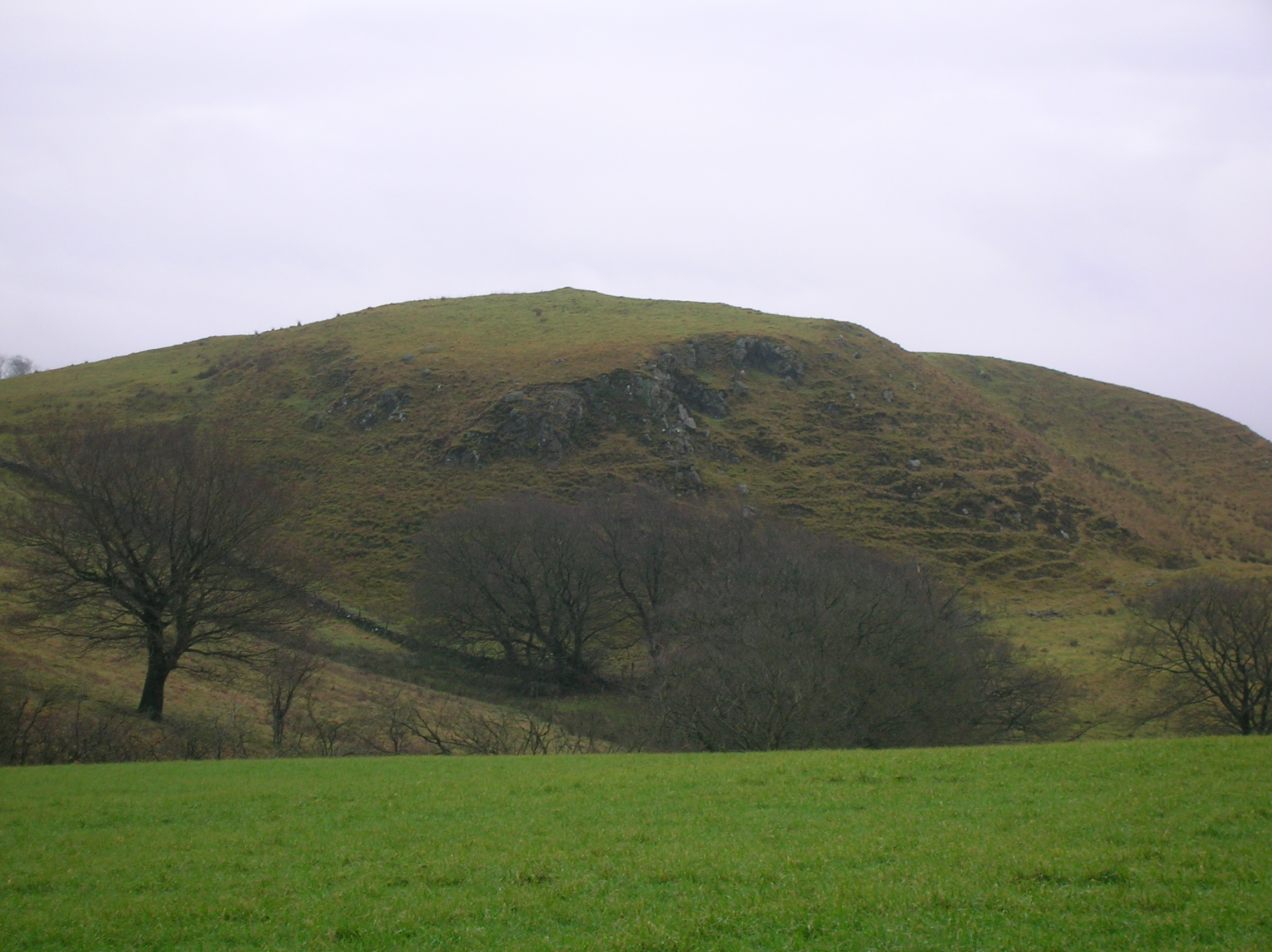
Craighead Law above Halket Loch's site

Craighead Lea or Law hill, 687 ft (209 m) high, is said to be a Moot hill, a justice or court hill controlled in feudal times by the local baron. Stones on its summit appear to be deliberately positioned and a grass covered cairn is very noticeable. A farmer from East Halket removed one of these to facilitate his ploughing. One stone on the summit has a vertical hole drilled to the depth of four feet or so, presumably to be used for 'slot' for a flagpole for flying a standard, a similar arrangement to that which existed at the Borestone at Greenhills near Beith. Near Aiket Castle is another Court Hill. Smith sees the law as a moot hill and as also a fort.

Previous location of Halket Loch, East Ayrshire

== Micro-history ==
Upon the murder of the 4th Earl of Eglinton at Stewarton in April 1586 the loch is mentioned in one version of the events – Their horsemen rode by the waters of Corsehill and Lugton and Glazert: they skirted the Halket Loch and the base of the rocky knolls of Dunlop. This indicates that the loch was of some significant size in the 1580s.

On the lands of East Halket stood a highland grit standing stone, standing 4 ft 6in high, removed circa 1905.

This surname Halket was derived from the lands of Halkhead, Renfrewshire, although a family bearing the name de Ross have long been in record as possessors of the property. The place name may have originally been Hawkwood. Sir Henry Hakette witnessed a charter in 1230, and appears to be the first of the name on record. Halkit, Halkhet, Halkette, Haket, Hacet, Hacat, Hakkett, Holkat, Halkhead, Halkhaide, Halkheid, and Halkheide are all variations of the name Halkhead.

In 1896 a new road, the Halket Road, 7 furlongs long, was built between the Duniflat and the Bradlie Roads.
