= Dunlop, East Ayrshire =

Coordinates: 55.7°N 4.54°W

Dunlop: Scottish Gaelic: Dùn Lob; Scots: Dunlap
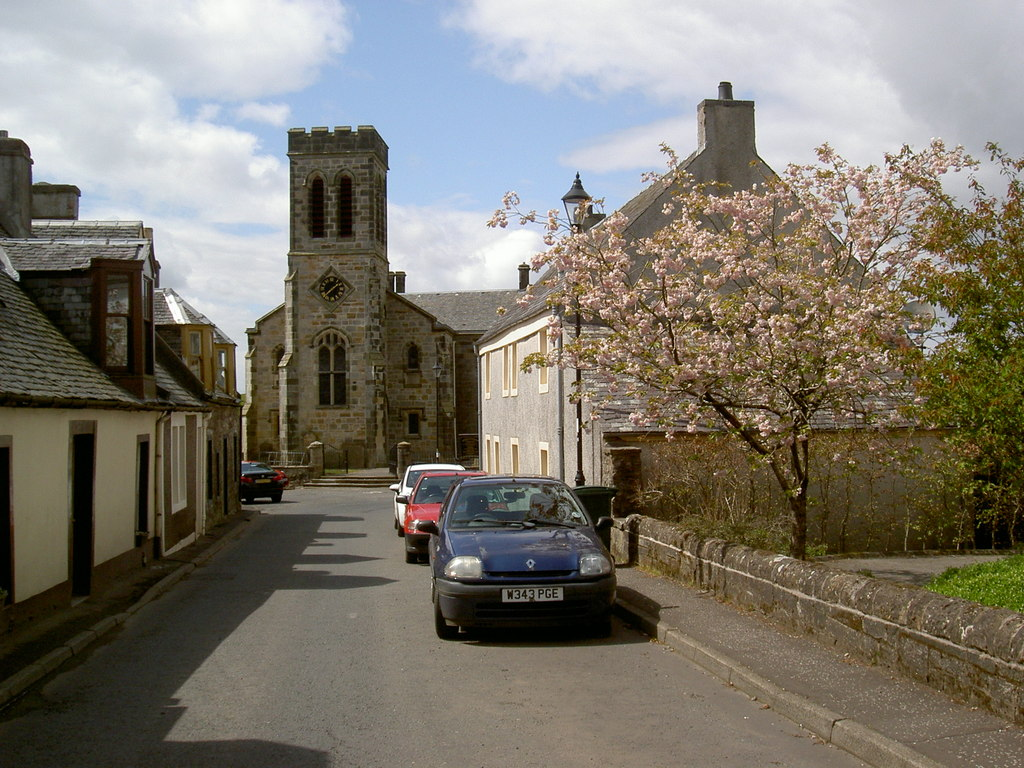
- Main Street, Dunlop

- Location within East Ayrshire
- Population: 1,170 (2020)
- Council area: East Ayrshire
- Lieutenancy area: Ayrshire and Arran
- Country: Scotland
- Sovereign state: United Kingdom
- Post town: Kilmarnock
- Postcode district: KA3
- Dialling code: 01560
- Police: Scotland
- Fire: Scottish
- Ambulance: Scottish
- UK Parliament: Kilmarnock and Loudoun
- Scottish Parliament: Kilmarnock and Irvine Valley

Dunlop (/dʌnˈlɒp/; Scots: Dunlap, Scottish Gaelic: Dùn Lob or Scottish Gaelic: Dùn Lùib) is a village and parish in East Ayrshire, Scotland. It lies on the A735, north-east of Stewarton, seven miles (eleven kilometres) from Kilmarnock. The road runs on to Lugton and the B706 enters the village from Beith and Burnhouse.

== History ==
=== The village ===
The name, first recorded in 1260, may be derived from the Gaelic words Dun (a castle) and Luib (a bend). Therefore, it is the fortified hill by the bend in the river. The old local pronunciation was Dulop or Delap without an 'n' and this has led to suggestions of other origins.

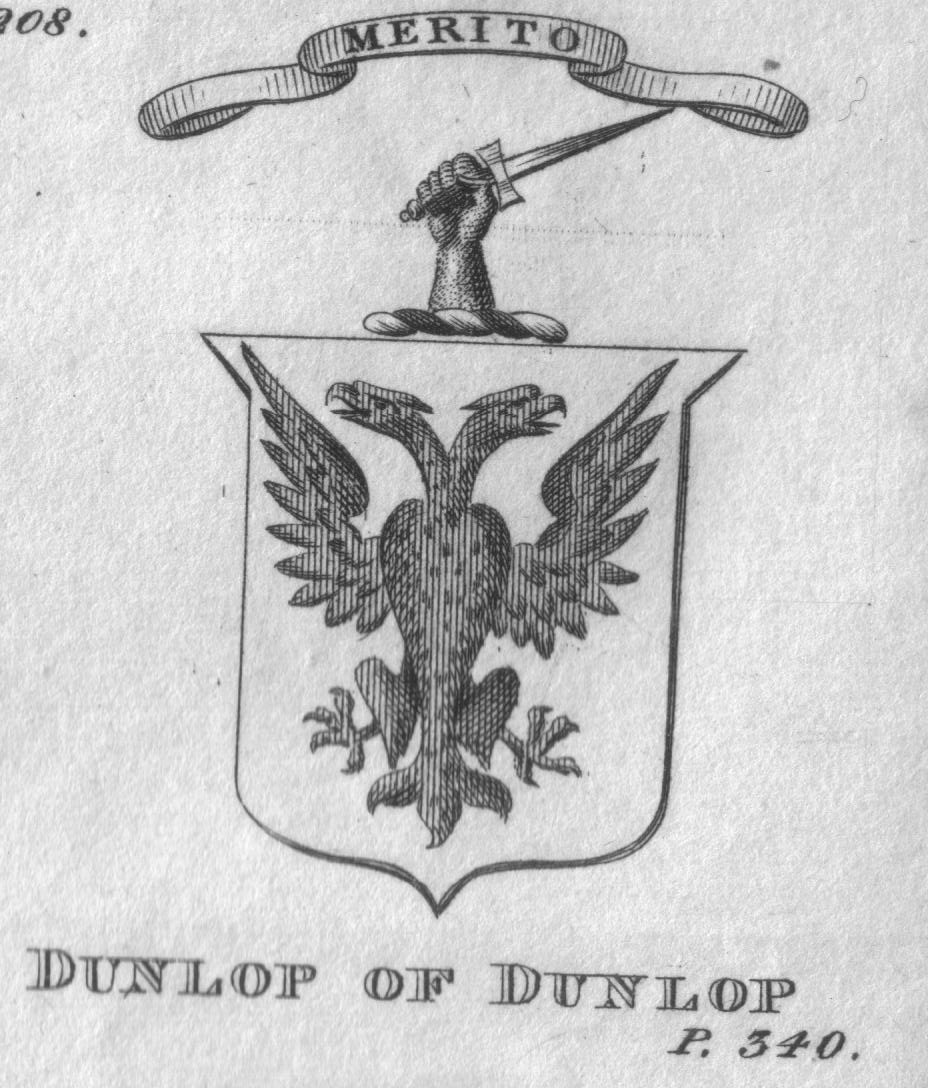
The Coat of arms of Dunlop of Dunlop

In the 1600s, Dunloppe had two fairs a year for the sale of dairy stock, one on the second Friday of May; and the other called Hallowday, on 12 November. The Estate was erected into the Barony of Dunlop in 1688. Dunlap, Dunlapp, Dunlape, Dunlopp, Dunlope, Dunloup, Downlop, Dalape, Delap, DeLap, Delappe, Dulop, Dulap, Dulape, Dullope, Donlop, Donlap, Dounlap, Dunlip, Dewlap are all recorded variations of today's Dunlop.

Dunlop cheese, a sweet milk cheese, was first made by Barbara Gilmour who went to Ireland to escape the covenanting prosecutions. Her stone cheese press was said to be preserved at 'The Hill' Farm in the 1860s but the existing press is dated after her death. The cheese became world famous and created a cottage industry, with cheese merchants from Kirktoun buying up the cheeses and taking them to Glasgow for sale. The cheese-making used up excess fresh milk but the coming of the railways reduced the need for cheese manufacture. Dunlop cheeses are still made at Clerkland Farm (2010).

Tam Giffen was reputed to be a warlock from the Dunlop Parish and many anecdotes are told of his marvellous doings in the 1860s. Tam could not get over the flood swollen Lugton Water so he just ....came through below it. On another occasion he was prevented from helping the Devil blow a man off the thatched roof he was repairing by the man uttering God save me and had to make do with blowing off the man's wig and bonnet; finally he once entered a blacksmith's house by flying down the chimney. Tam died in odd circumstances, supposedly being murdered by the fairies for giving away their secrets.

In 1791 Dunlop is recorded as having six masons, 12 weavers, three smiths, three shoemakers, four tailors and three inn-keepers; by 1874 the village had 10 shoemakers, eight masons, six weavers, six smiths, five wrights and one tailor, but no baker or flesher and the people's health was such that no surgeon was need or writer (lawyer). 1823 saw 'Mackie's Mill', producing woollen blankets, being set up on the banks of the Glazert Water and by 1939 Mackie's Mill was producing carpet yarn and had also branched out to establish two more manufacturing sites. In 1849 a Mr Wilson set up shop as a ham curer. By the 1930s this ham-curing business had diversified, branched out into Ireland and had factories in Barrhead and at Eglinton in Irvine; the original curing house, known as the 'Burnhouse', has been landscaped and transformed into a local park thanks to funding from the Barcapel Foundation, previously the Clement Wilson Foundation. Robert Howie and sons started a small meal-mill in 1857 and then established a sawmill. They moved closer to the railway, where they remained until recently (2010).

The railway finally came to Dunlop in 1871 and because of the improved connection with Glasgow the farmers were able to send their milk direct to Glasgow, resulting in the decline and finally the cessation of cheese making in Dunlop. The population of the village in 1871 was 380 and 357 in 1881, whilst the parish was 1,160 and 1,361 persons respectively. In 1876 the town had acquired a butcher, a baker, a branch of the Clydesdale Bank and a Free Church (1845) but still no writer or doctor was needed. By the 1950s Dunlop had a post office, four grocers, a baker, a newsagent, a hotel and a public house.

Below the church stands the bridge over the Black Burn, known locally as the 'Tee Wal Burn' after a spring that flows out under the bridge. It is commonly thought that the 'Tea Well' water was so pure that the people went there to get the water for their tea but it may be a Gaelic element related to the name for a place where the coffin bearers rested for the last time before heading up the hill to the cemetery. The 1860s OS maps show that a cottage, Bridgend, once stood close to the bridge.

=== Dunlop's castles ===
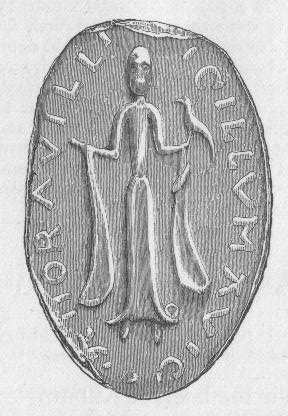
The Seal of Richard De Morville, Lord of Cunninghame and his Lady Avicia

A tradition states that the De Ross's first held Boarland or Dunlop hill (NS 4019 4940) as their seat and a well-fortified structure existed there. Later their seat was moved to Corsehill in Stewarton. There may have been a Celtic hillfort here, as suggested by the etymology of the placename.

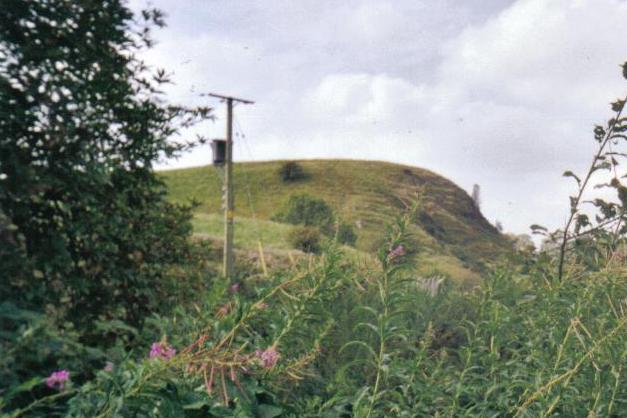
A view of Dunlop or Borland Hill from near the Church. This was the site of the De Ross family castle.

In 1848 the Scottish Journal records that a number of years ago the foundation of a ruin of considerable extent was removed by the late proprietor. In 1853 Mr Dobie recorded that There can still be traced the meiths (boundary line) of a building of considerable extent on the top of the Hill of Borland. In 1856 Mr G. Howie of Dunlop stated that he remembered seeing a small portion of what was said to be one of the walls about 70 or 80 years ago. It was a sort of bank, quite crumbled down and overgrown with grass. Since then the ruins of a building of considerable extent have been removed and the ground cultivated. On the southern side of the hill there are the remains of a wide ditch or fosse, locally known as the 'Cuckoo slide’. Paterson in 1866 states that the foundation of a ruin was removed some years ago by a late proprietor.

Pont states that the ancient strong Dunlop Castle situated by the Clerkland Burn (NS 42737 49312) was protected by a moat or fosse of water and had “goodly” orchards. Smith records that the 'Airn Yett' of the old castle was still preserved and its details published (see Wikimedia). It was also called Hunt Hall because the Dunlops were huntsmen to the De Ross family (Paterson 1866). The whole estate was sometimes referred to as Hunt Hall. This castle was situated at the site of the present day Dunlop House.

The De Ross family were vassals to the De Morvilles, Overlords of Cunninghame. The De Morvilles backed John Balliol's claim to the crown and forfeited their lands to the Boyds, and in 1570 the lands were held by the Cassillis family. In 1600 it is noted that David Dunlop of Hapland excambied his lands with Patrick Cunninghame for his portion of the lands of Borland.

The native chiefs, although displaced from Boarland Hill, do not appear to have been exiled but instead established themselves at what is now Dunlop House. The name Boarland also survives in the names of Borlandhill, Over Borland, North Borland and Low Borland. The name Boarland could refer to the presence of wild boar, but a 'Boor' also meant a serf and Norman lords often apportioned lands near their castles for their servants. The Borland or Bordland also meant the land that was granted to the feudal superior specifically to be used to furnish food for his castle or dwelling.

There has been a modern-day military use of Dunlop Hill, for in the 20th-century, between the two World Wars, a Royal Observer Corps post composed of huts was built on top of the hill. The personnel tracked enemy-aircraft movement up the Clyde towards Glasgow. Development of more sophisticated radar tracking techniques after World War II made the facility redundant. Until the 1970s the UK Warning and Monitoring organisation operated a bunker on the hill top. The access door and ventilation louvres are still in place.

=== The Dunlops of that Ilk ===
Mrs. Frances Dunlop of Dunlop, Patron of Robert Burns. Daughter and sole heiress to Sir Thomas Wallace of Cragie.

The first recorded Dunlop is William de Dunlop of 1260, followed by a supporter of Edward I, Neil Fitz-Robert de Dulap of 1306. His estates were forfeited due to his support for John Balliol, as were those of the De Rosses. The family regained their lands by the mid 15th. Century and by that time we have 'of that Ilk' replacing the Norman 'de'. Sir James Dunlop of that Ilk held the estate in 1596 and married Jean, daughter of Somerville of Cambusnethan, descended from Lord Somerville. This may go some way to explaining why the Somerville family came to purchase lands at Montgomery-Crivoch and Bollingshaw in the 1800s to establish the Kennox Estate.

Frances Dunlop was a witness to the disposition of the Scottish Regalia in Edinburgh Castle after the Union of the Crowns. James Dunlop of 1634-1670 married Elizabeth, daughter of Cunninghame of Corsehill and was an outstanding leader of the covenanters. John Dunlop 1748-1784 married the daughter of Sir Thomas Wallace of Craigie.

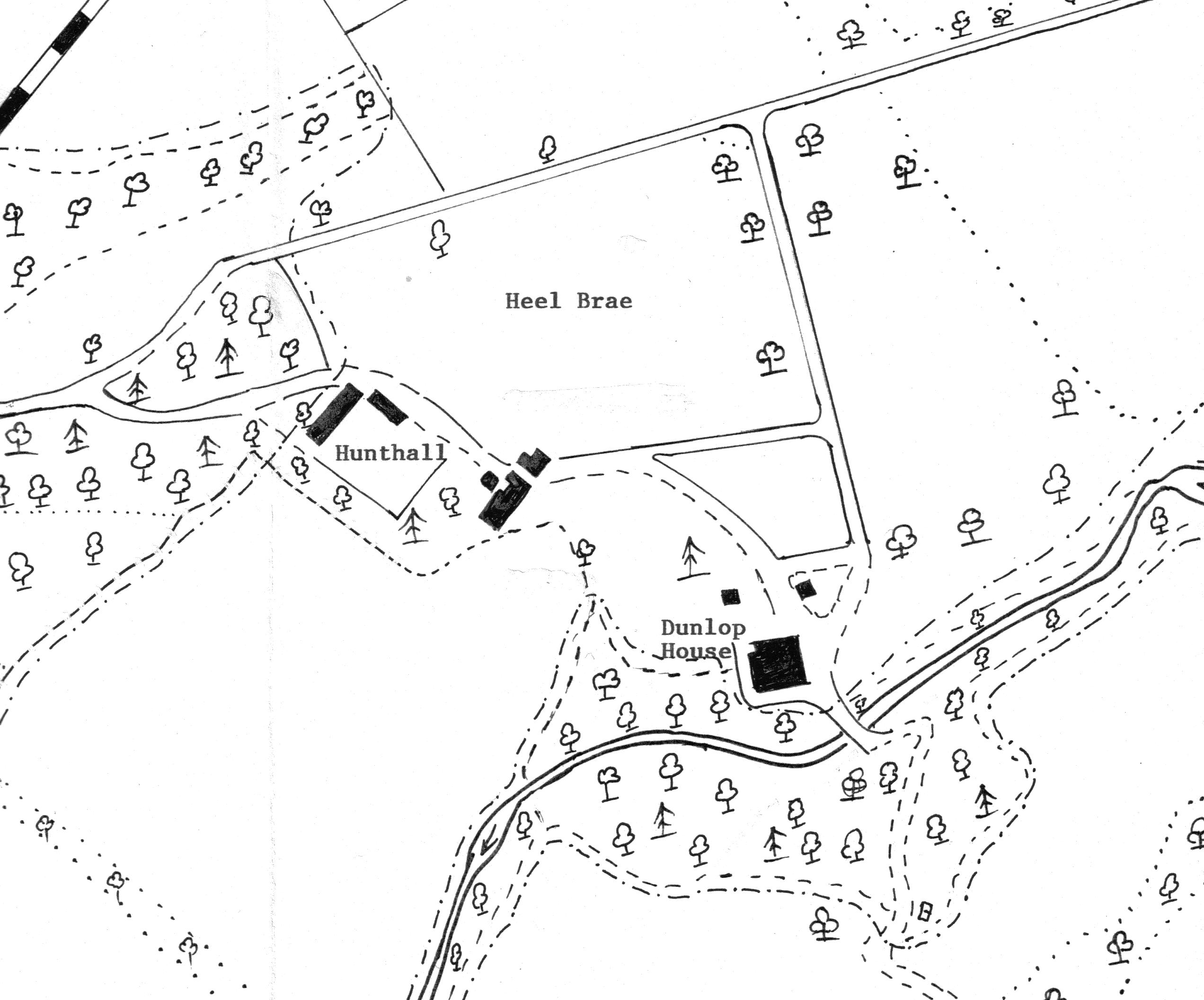
A map of Dunlop House and Hunt Hall

She was the patron of Burns already referred to and copied extra poems and letters to her copy of his 1786 Kilmarnock Edition, known as The Dunlop Burns held at the Rosenbach Museum and Library.

John Dunlop Esq. MP was resident at Dunlop House in 1837 and Pigot describes it as one of Ayrshires' handsomest mansions, with the Ogrestone or Thurgatstane lying within its estate boundaries. The house was designed in 1831–34 by David Hamilton for Sir James Dunlop of Dunlop. The house is an unusual Scottish-Jacobean style, but the gate lodge is more typical of Hamilton, with strap work, classical and manorial features (Milligan). The last Baronet was Major Sir James Dunlop of 1839-1858 who died unmarried.

The last of the Dunlops to be born at Dunlop were John (1904) and Alexander (1906) Houison Crawfurd. Mrs Houison Crawfurd is remembered for producing the first tubercular-free cattle in Ayrshire. The house was let to a number of tenants, the Henderson family of the Anchor Line being the most notable. In 1933 the house was sold to Ayrshire County Council as a home for “mentally defective” (language used at the time) children.

The Clerkland Burn rivulet runs past the Dunlop House mansion, forming the boundary between the parishes of Stewarton and Dunlop.

==== The Brechna Braes and Brackenheugh ====
The Brechna Braes area lies close to Dunlop and has been developed as the Templehouse Community Woodland to celebrate the 2000 Millennium. The Brackenheugh is a wooded slope overlooking Aiket Castle. It is said to be the site of the death of one of the Cunninghames of Aiket, killed by a Montgomerie during the times of the feuds between these families.

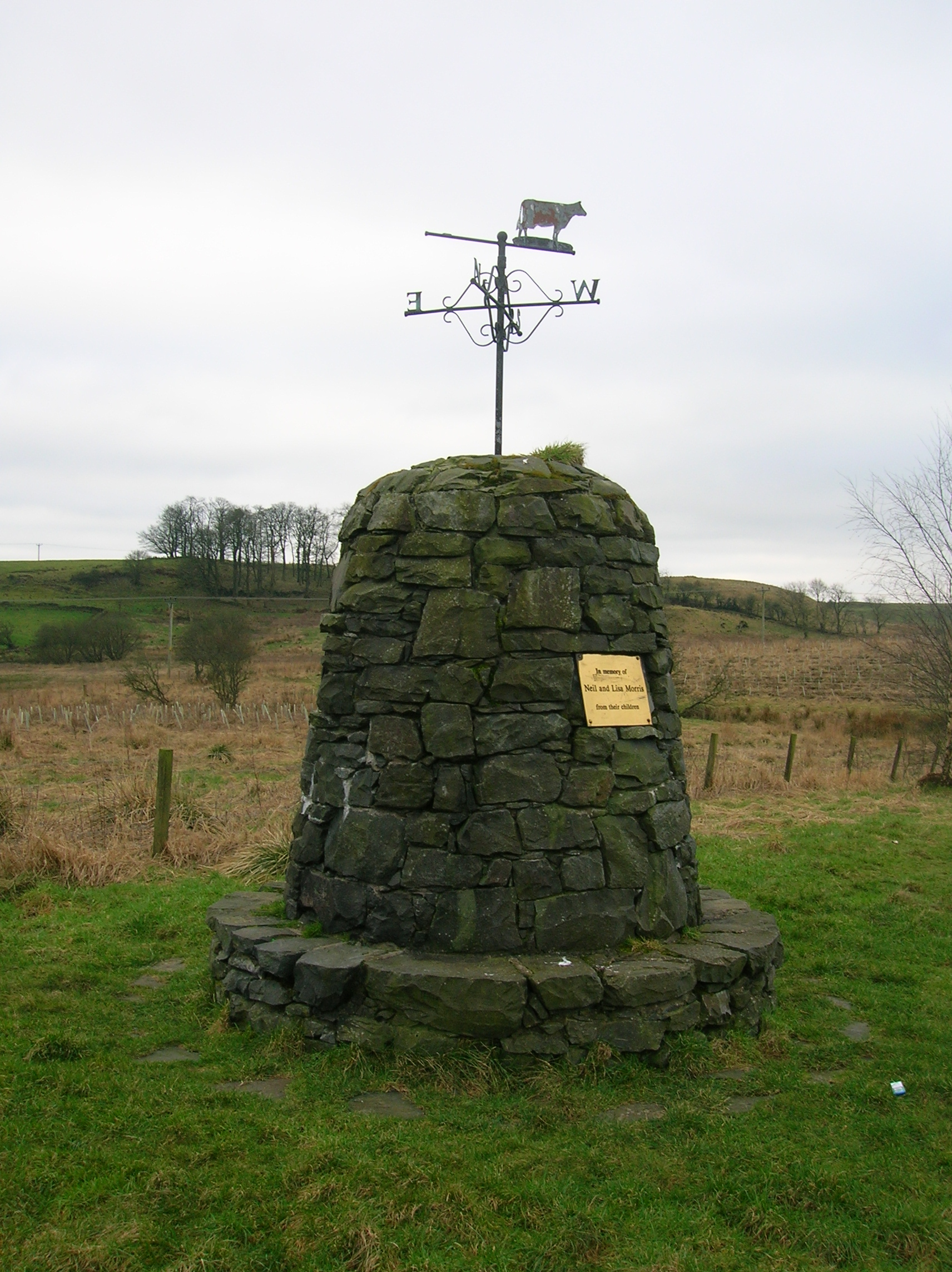
The cairn at the Dunlop Millennium Community Woodland

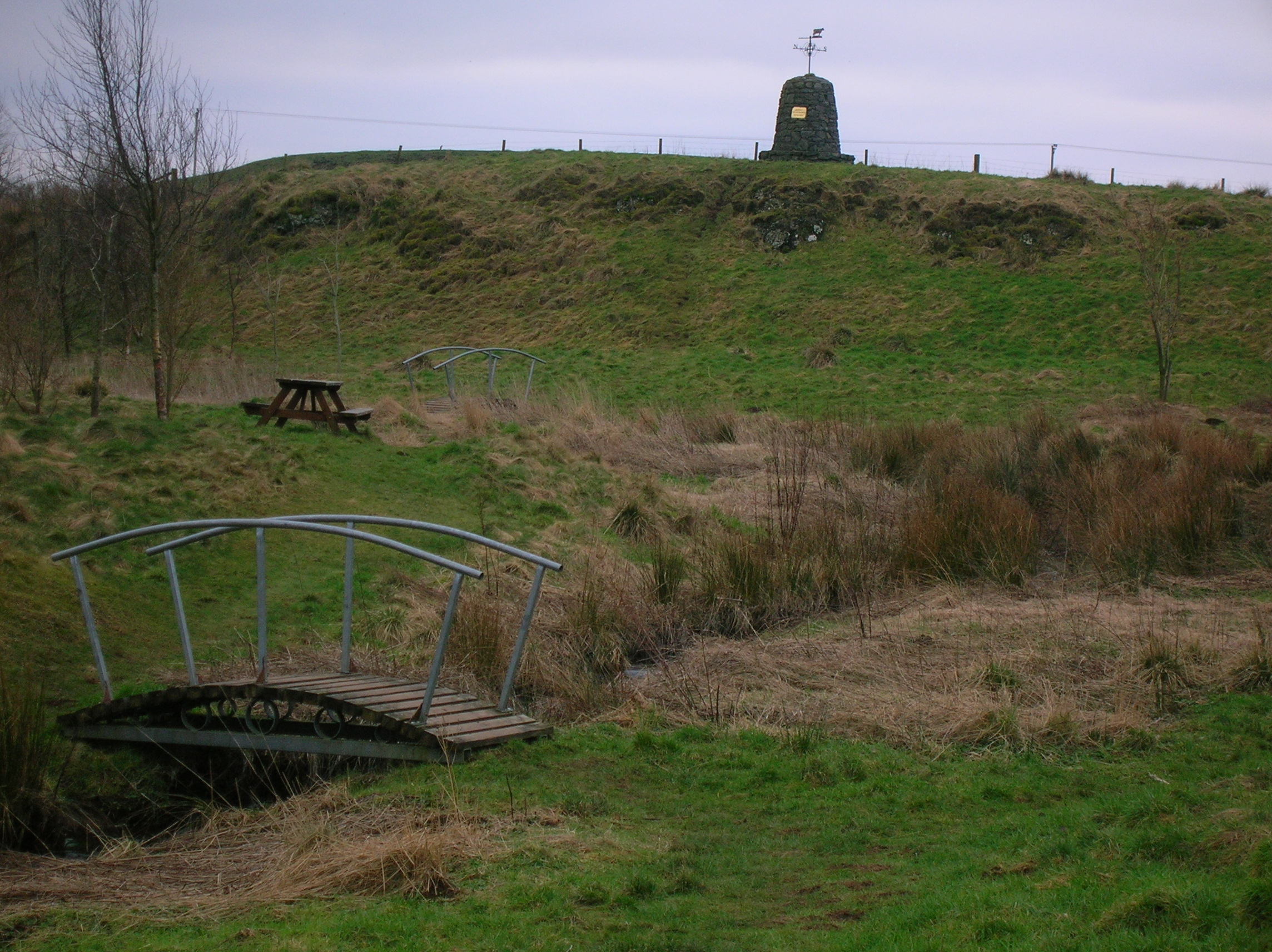
A view of Braikenheugh Hill, the bridge, etc.

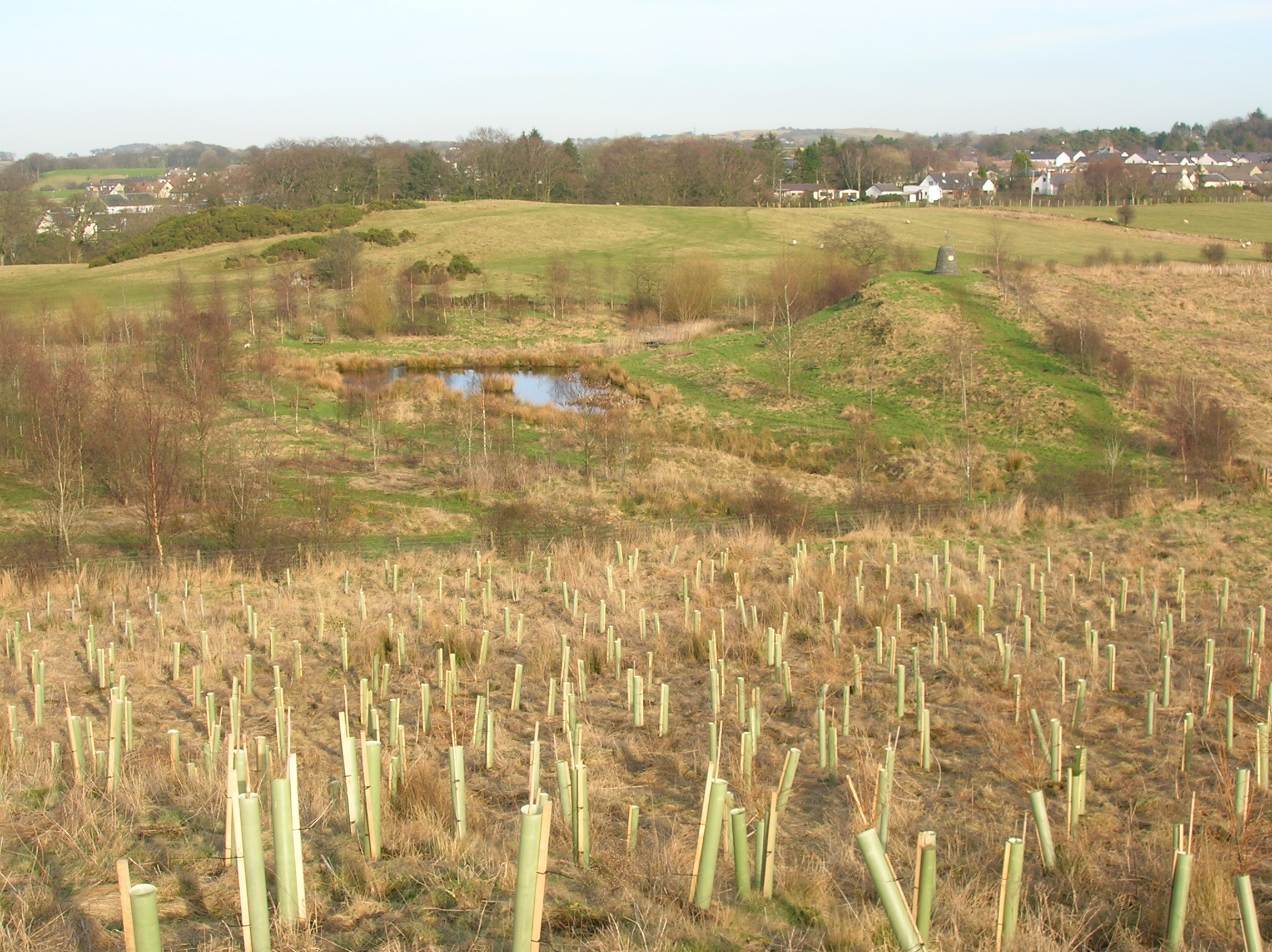
The view from the Templehouse woodland

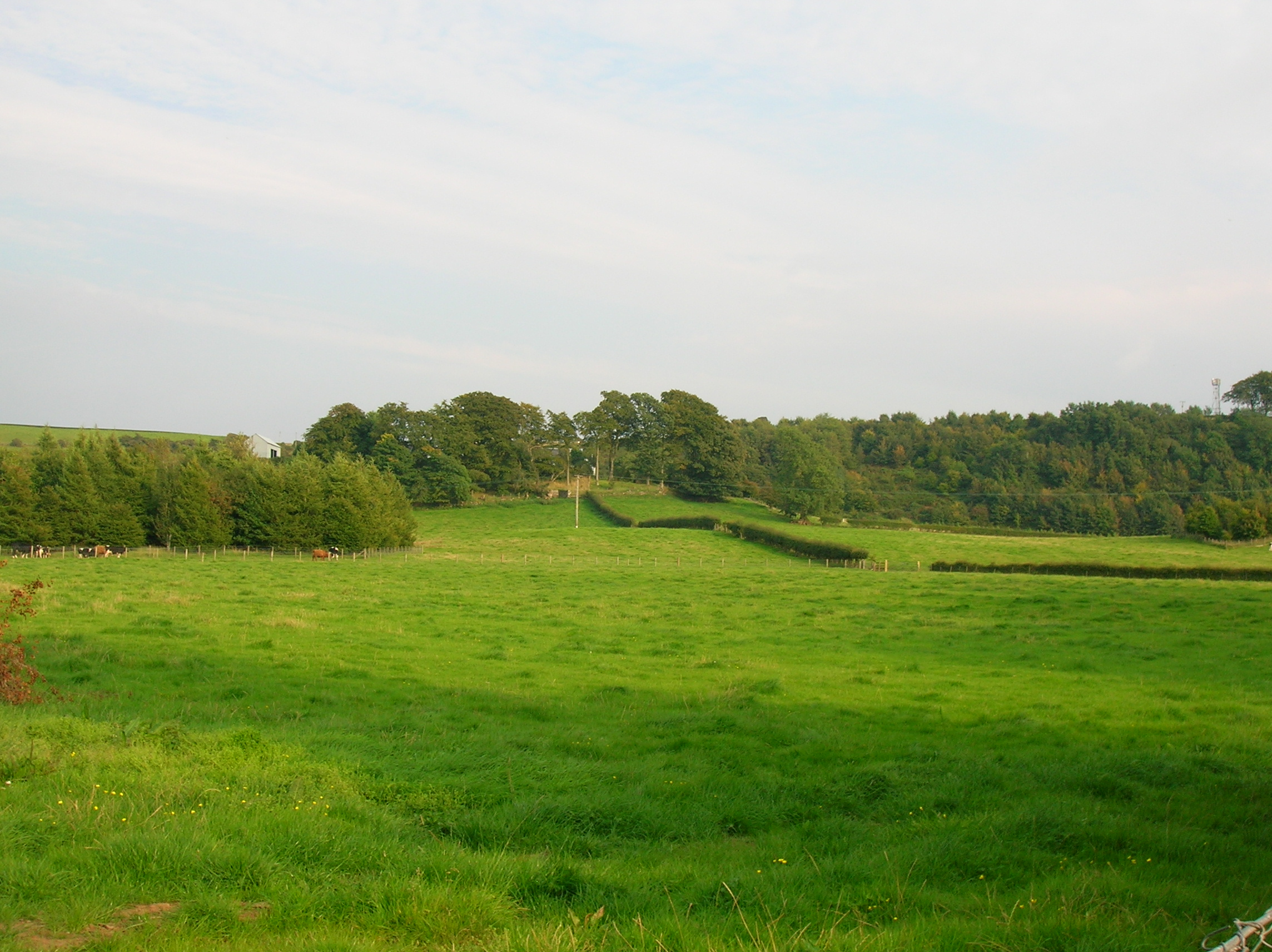
The Brackenheugh from Aiket Castle

== Dunlop Church ==
In 1516 John Major or Mair, said to be the instructor of John Knox held the post of vicar, mostly absentee as he was a professor of theology. By 1566 the vicar was John Houston, who held the manse, garden and an acre of land adjoining the manse. The rest of the Kirkland-Dunlop lands passed from the Abbots of Kilwinning to William Cunninghame of Aiket and remained with the Cunninghames until the latter half of the 17th century. The Earl of Eglinton held the right of patronage when it was abolished in 1875.

The tomb of Hans Hamilton and his wife at Dunlop Church, called the 'Picture House' by locals

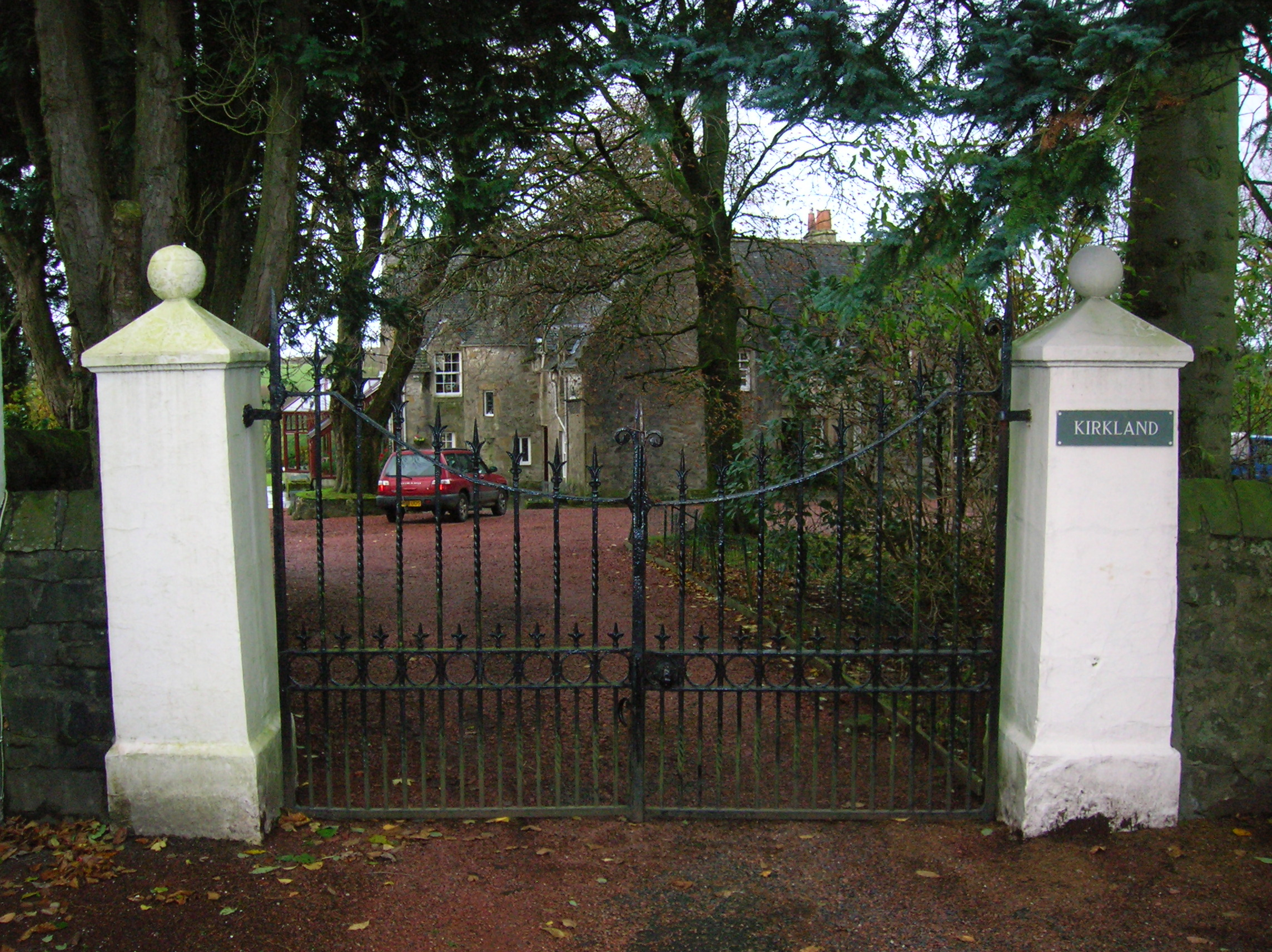
The entrance to the old manse at Kirklands

The church (NS 40474 49414) was probably built in around 1766, however by 1834 it was dilapidated and demolition followed, resulting in the construction of the Dunlop parish church, opened in December 1835, that we see today. This took place under the ministry of Mathew Dickie, who left to join the Free Church at Beith in 1843. Parts of the original building are in use as tomb stones. Barbara Gilmour, famous for introducing the production of Dunlop cheese, is buried in the churchyard. Major McAlester of Kennox, then a heritor, obtained the 1792 bell and Miss McAlester and Charles G. S. McAlester returned it to the Kirk Session in 1935 to honour the centenary of the present church.

The Rev William Gebbie was the last minister to come into the parish under the old system of patronage, in this case that of the Earl of Eglinton. William was a fervent evangelist and the 'Dunlop Revival' shook the whole parish until the reverend was charged with heresy in the early 1860s. He remained as minister until 1883.

The old manse was sold and a new manse and offices were built by the heritors under the incumbency of Thomas Brisbane in 1781. This manse adjoined the 7 acres of the glebe and was extended by the Revd Dickie. The Kirktoun of Dunlop composed the manses and a row of cottages dated 1644, 1765, 1773, etc.

=== Hans Hamilton and the Picture House ===
John or Hans Hamilton (1535/6–1608), son of Archibald Hamilton of Raploch, was the first Protestant vicar and exhorter of Dunlop Church. One of his sons, James Hamilton, was created Viscount Claneboye for his many services to James VI in establishing and maintaining Protestantism in Ireland; his son James was in turn created Earl Clanbrassil by Charles I. His five brothers also established estates in Ireland. A handsome mausoleum (NS 40486 49398) was constructed over their graves by James in 1641, when he was in his eighties, and this was so ornately painted and gilded in the Roman Catholic manner that it attracted the sobriquet of 'The Picture House'. The flat tombstone of Hans Hamilton was originally on the floor, but was later removed and placed on the south wall. It was neglected and vandalised even in 1699, and in 1734 was given much needed repairs. Around 1849 Colonel Mure of Caldwell had further repairs carried out. The marble statues of Hans and his wife have been restored and the mausoleum provided with lighting.

Jean Hamilton, the daughter of Hans Hamilton, had a dowry of 5000 merks in 1613.

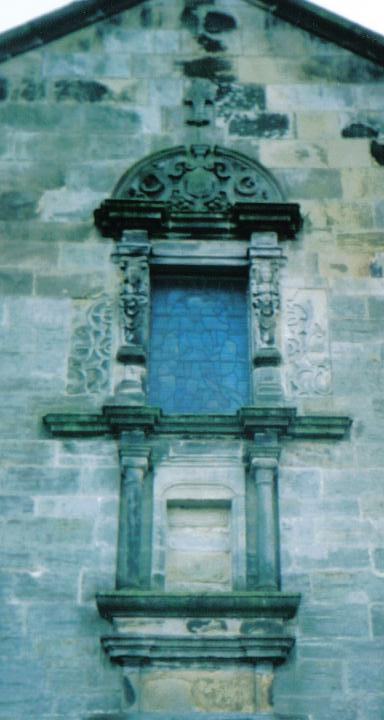
Carved stonework from an old fireplace at Dunlop House and a finial from the old kirk incorporated into the new church on the Dunlop Aisle

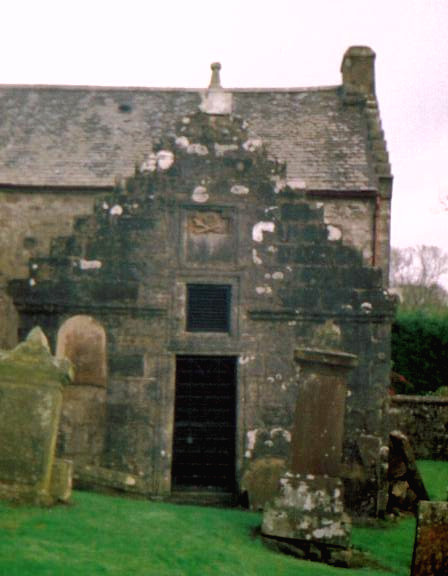
The tomb of Hans Hamilton and his wife, called the 'Picture House' because of the gaudy colours of the decoration within the tomb

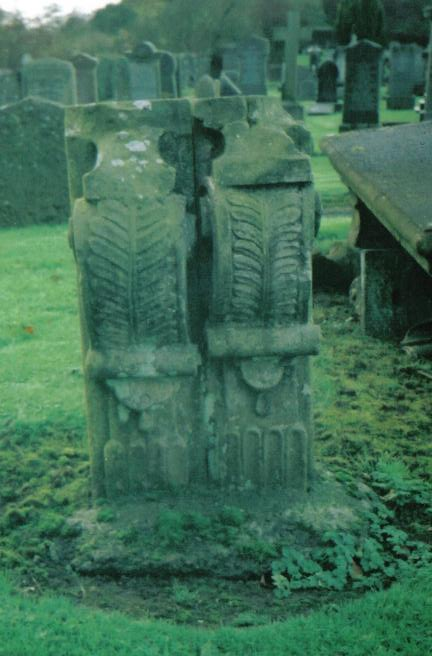
A tombstone made from carved stones taken from the old kirk

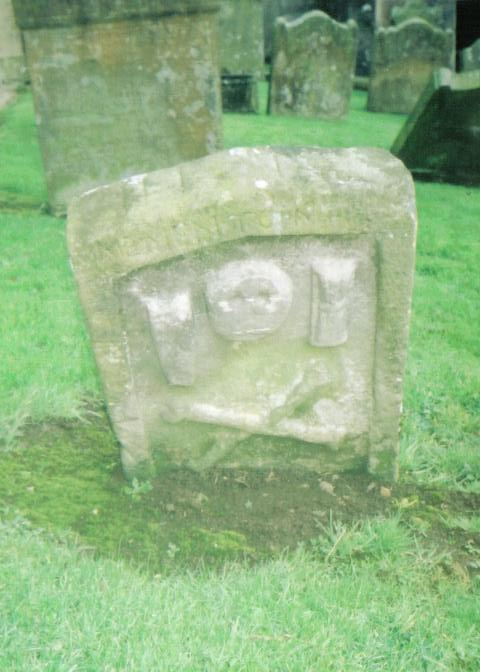
An old tombstone with skull, cross-bones and a timer

=== Clandeboye school ===
Viscount Claneboye also built and invested a school, now known as Clandeboye Hall (Claneboye in his title was spelt differently from the placename Clandeboye) and used by the church for events. Carved above the door was the date 1641 with the statement This school is erected and endowed by Iames Clandeboyes, in love to this parish in which his father Hans Hamilton was pastor 45 years in King Iames the sixt his raigne. The carving was removed when the school was sold as a private dwelling. In 1839 a new school was opened. The school had been condemned by 1876 and was in use as a shoemaker's shop and a dwelling.

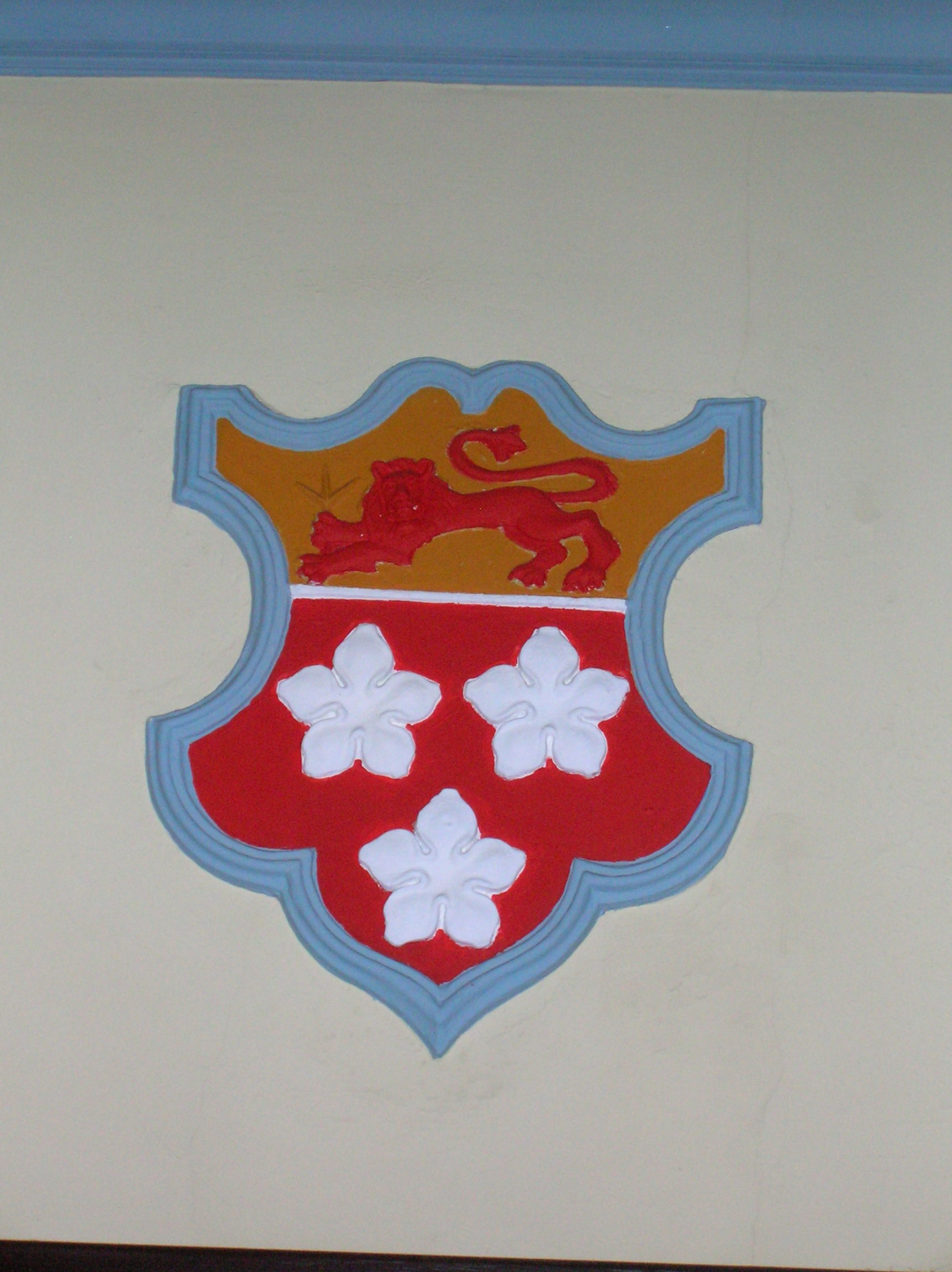
Coat of Arms of Baron Hamilton, Viscount Claneboye in the Clandeboye Hall

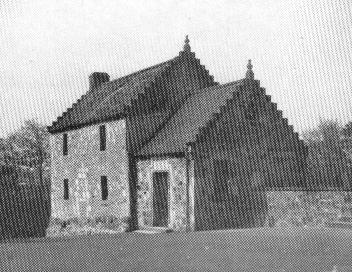
The Old School built by Viscount Claneboye

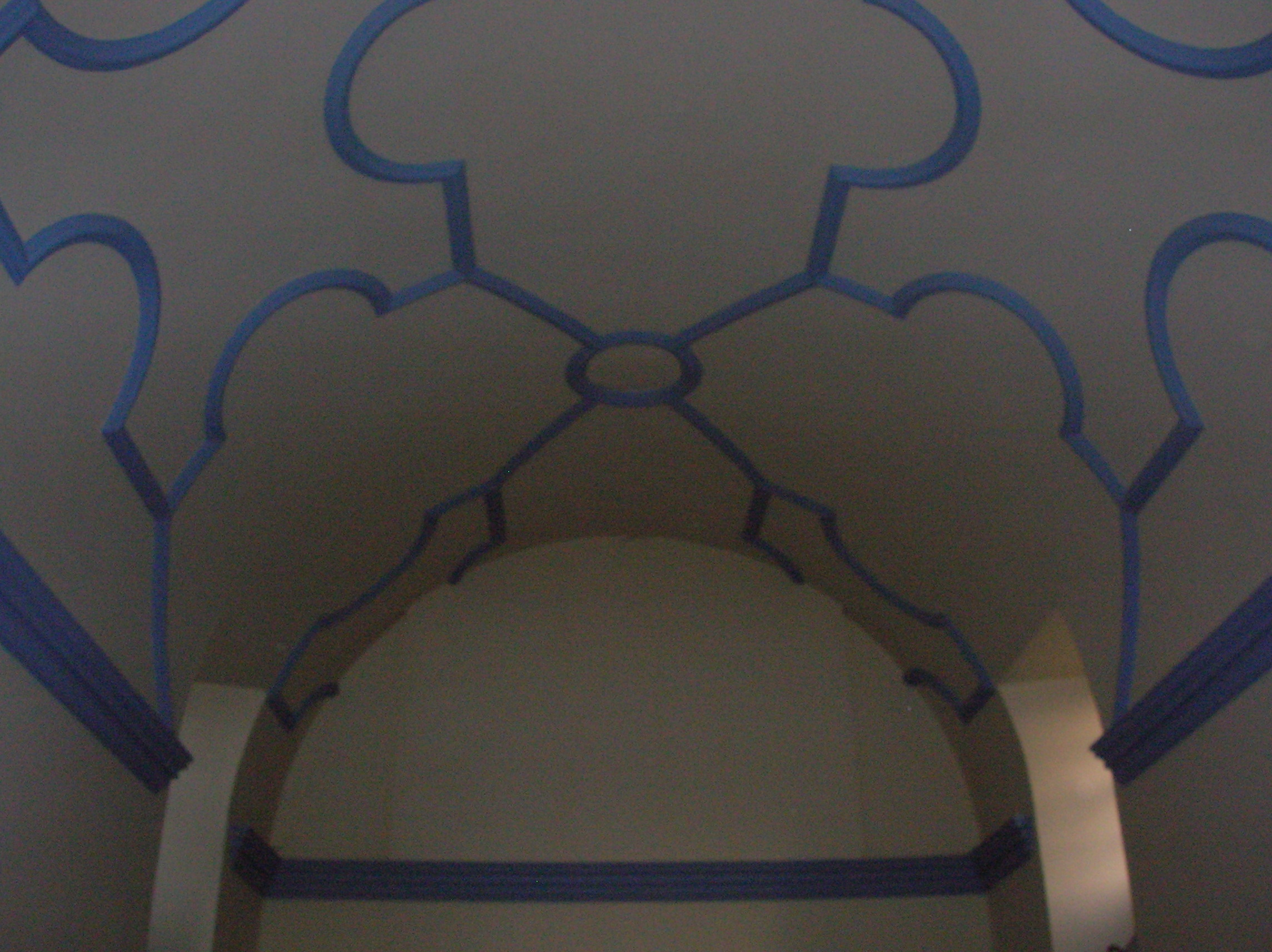
The ceiling of Clandeboye Hall following the 1925 rebuilding

== Sports clubs ==
=== Dunlop Golf Club ===
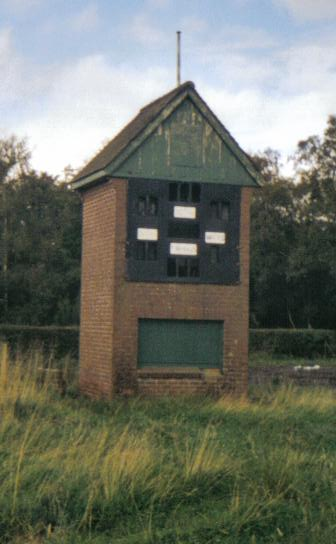
The Score Board building at the old Dunlop Cricket Club in 2008

The Dunlop Golf Course had nine holes and was at first located at Hapland in 1908 but moved to Templehouse in 1909 where it remained until closure in 1922. The ground was reported to be "of a sporting character, being varied and undulating. It is about a twelve-minute walk from the station, and about two miles [three kilometres] from Stewarton. The membership fee of 10 shillings for gentlemen and 5s for ladies is very moderate. In 1914 the secretary was J H Marr, 2 Mansfield Terrace. A 9 hole course situated on Templehouse Grounds with a membership of 150. There was no entry fee. Subs were 12/6d. Visitors’ fees were 1/- a day and 2/6d a week. Sunday play was not allowed." The only remains are that of a bunker that overlooks the ruins of Templehouse. It operated from 1911 through to 1915 and at the AGM the freedom of the course was granted to all military personnel, nurses and staff stationed at the Dunlop House Military Hospital; in addition they decided to retain the membership of those members serving in the Forces.

=== Dunlop Curling Pond ===
The local curling pond is shown on the early OS map near Templehouse and was located on Minnie's Meadow fed by the Templehouse and Hill Burns small. Dated photographs show that it was still in use circa 1912/1913.

=== Dunlop Cricket Club ===
Dunlop had a cricket club near North Netherhouses that was visible from the railway. The brick built score board was the last relict but has now been demolished. The foundations of the old club house are still visible.

=== Darts ===
Dunlop has an active and healthy darts scene. With its own "individual" league. Attracting players not only from the village itself but from surrounding areas such as Stewarton, Irvine, Kilmarnock and even as far as Barrhead. They have 22 players as of 2020.

== Aiket Castle ==
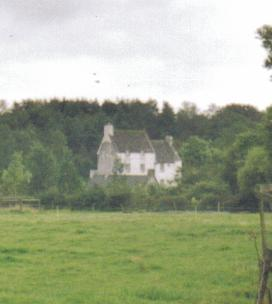
A view of Aiket Castle in 2006

Aiket Castle itself was originally a square tower typical of the residences of the lesser feudal Norman barons, originally surrounded by a moat. The name is derived from 'Oak Wood'. The family were descended from the Cunninghames of Bedland, who were cadets of the family of Glencairn. Alexander Cunninghame is the first recorded as living at Aiket. Three Aiket daughters were married to participants in the tale of the murder of the 4th Earl of Eglinton.'

== Pagan and pre-reformation sites ==
=== The Carlin Stone or Hag Stone ===
On top of the Commoncraigs or Common Crags overlooking Dunlop and the Glazert is a large procumbent boulder known on the OS map as the ‘Carlin’s Stone or Stane’. A Carl is a commoner, a husband or in a derogatory sense, a churl or male of low birth. More commonly the name Carlin was used as a derogatory term for a woman meaning an 'old hag'. It is also said to be a corruption or Scots equivalent of the Gaelic word "Cailleach", meaning a witch or the 'old Hag', the Goddess of Winter. This would therefore be the Witch's or Hag's Stone, one of several in Scotland with this name.

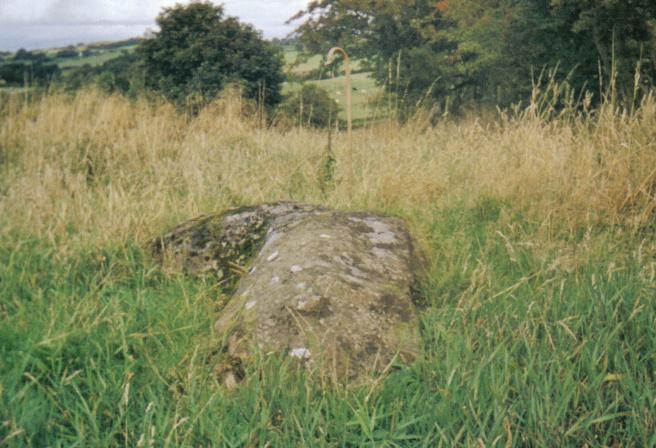
A view of the Carlin Stone

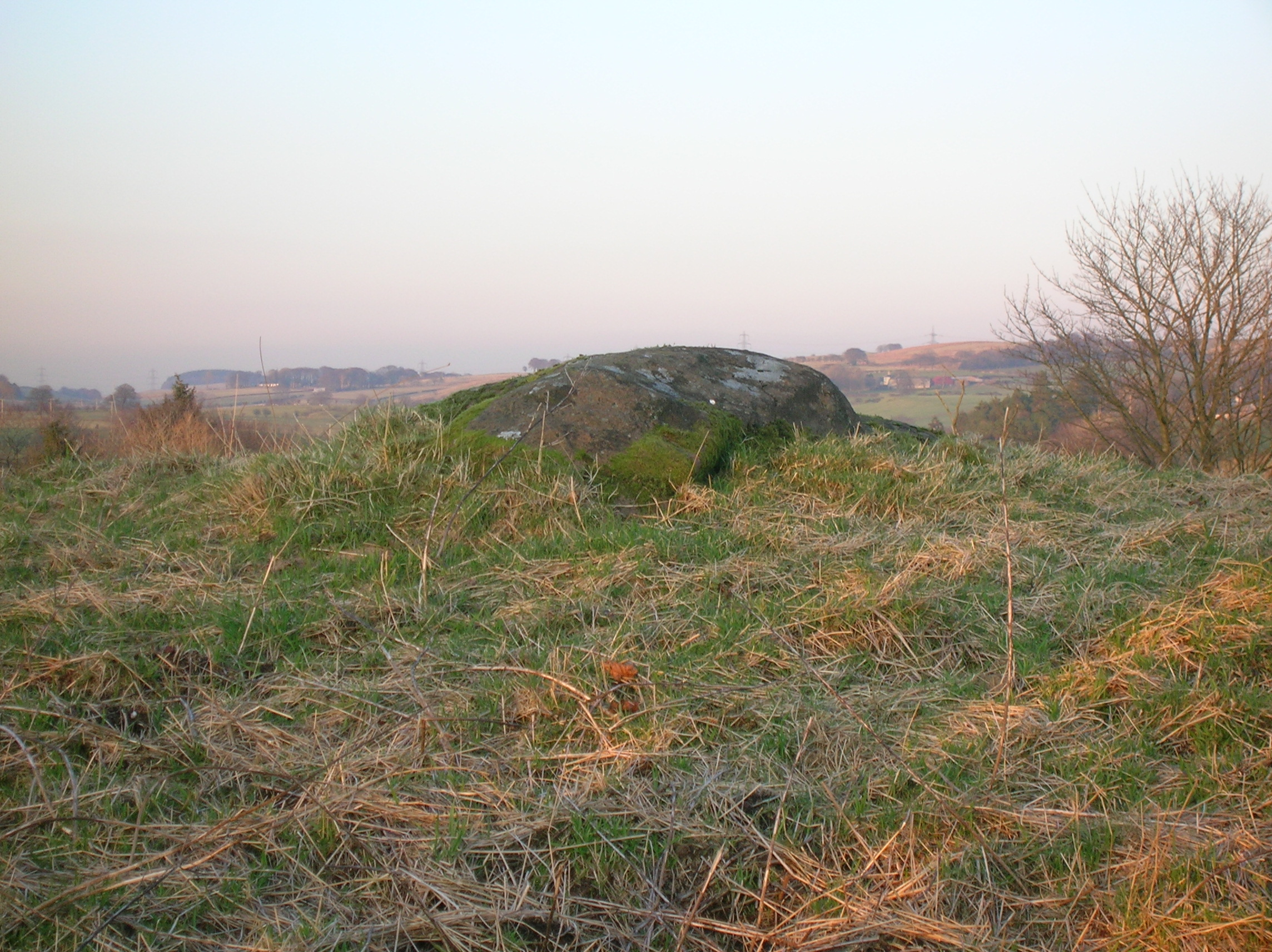
The Carlin stone from the Commoncraigs Community Woodland

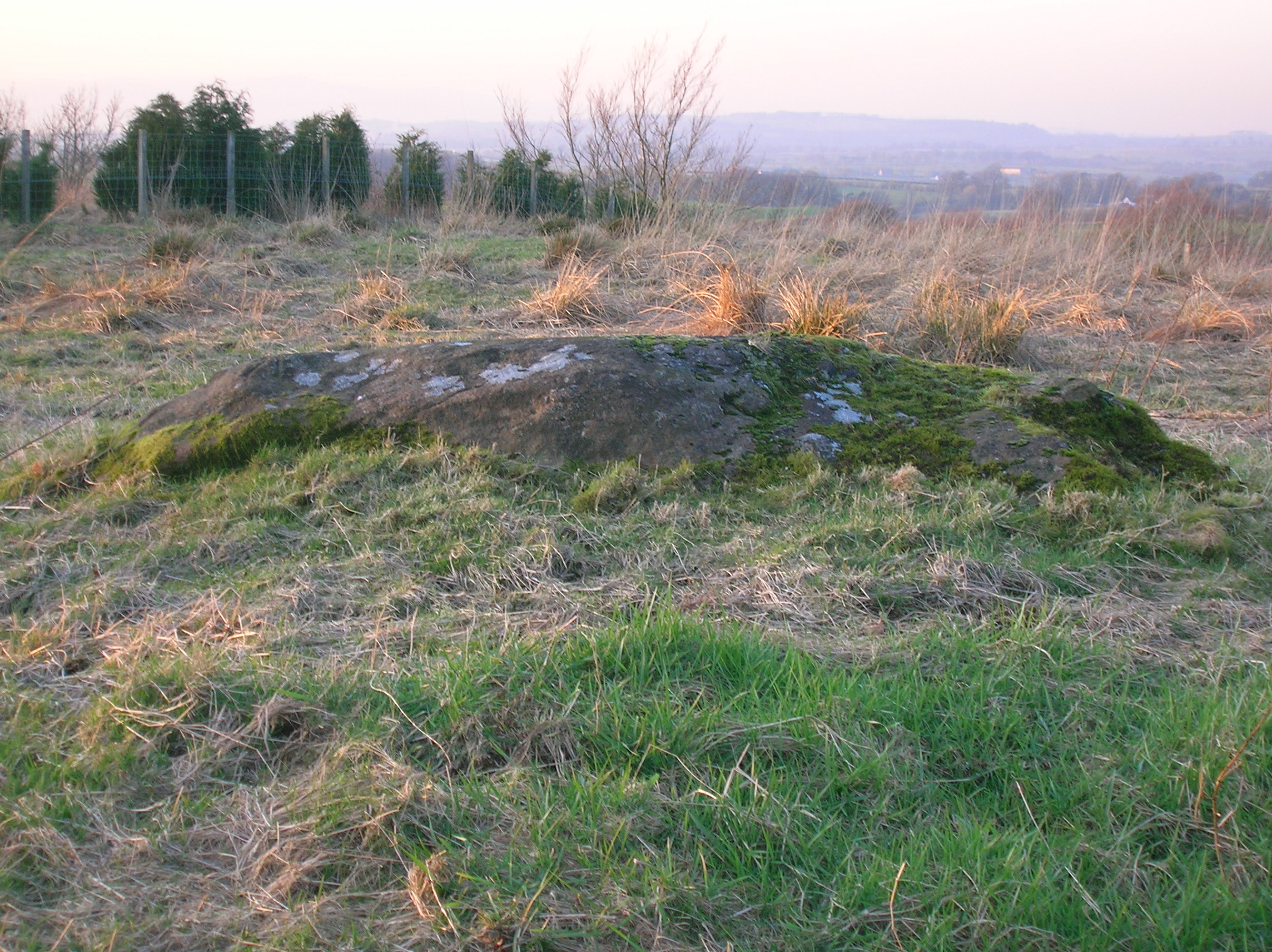
Illustrating the procumbent position of the stone

Near Kirkhill outside Stewarton are several farms having the name 'Kilbride' in their title. Bride - an anglicization of Brìghde, Brìd or Saint Brigid- was originally the Celtic Goddess linked with the festival of Imbolc, the eve of the first of February. Carlin's Tooth is the name of a rock outcrop in the borders between Knocks Knowe and Carter Fell. Three farms named 'Carlingcrags' are to be found above Darvel in East Ayrshire.

=== The Thurgatstane or Ogrestane ===
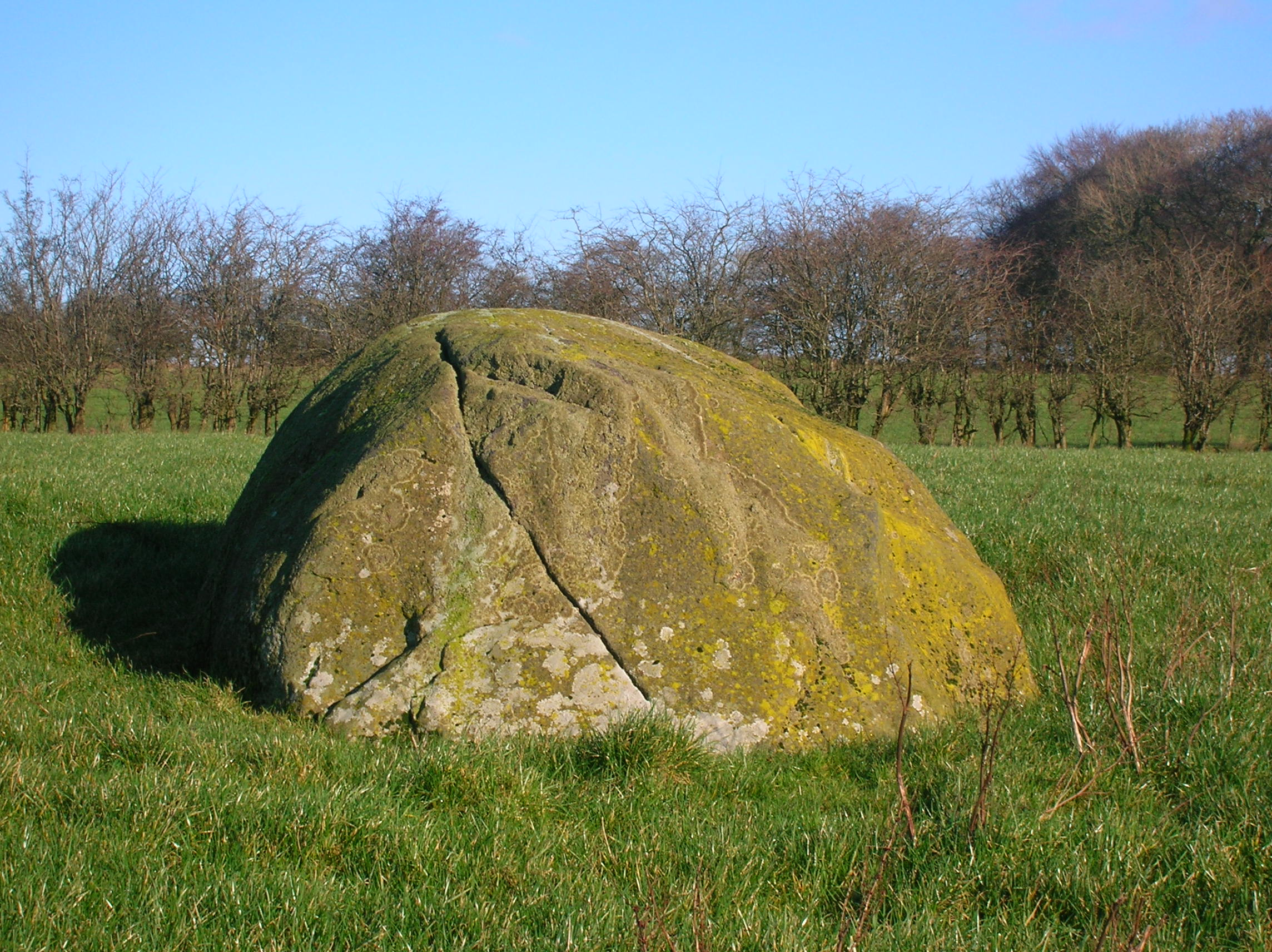
The North Side

The Thurgartstone is just outside Dunlop on the Lugton Road in the valley of the Black Burn. It is in a sheltered spot, with ample running water and well hidden from immediate view. In the middle of a field near the Chapel Crags is the Thurgatstane or Ogrestane, also known as the Thorgatstane, Field Spirit Stane, T'Ogra Stane, Thugart Stane, Ogirtstane, Ogart stane, Horgar Stane, Fiend's Stane or Thougritstane. It is a glacial erratic stone, composed of blue augitic porphyrite and is quite unlike the 'native' stone of the district, weighing about 25 tons and measuring about twelve feet by eight feet as measured above ground. It is set near the site of the pre-reformation St. Mary's Chapel and has long been associated with pagan ritual practices.

Few places have so many different names attached to them. One explanation is that the stone is 'Thor's Great Stone', another is that is "Thou Great Stone" or just '"grit stane", whilst 'The Stone of the Ogre' may reflect some forgotten legend of how the stone came to be in this position. Some names may be spelling errors perpetuated by or from Ordnance Survey and other maps. Another explanation of the name is that it is derived from 'Tagairtstane,' meaning the priest's stone. This 'Druidical' stone may have been a 'rocking or logan' stone at one time, but it is now firmly set in the 'rubbish' and soil.

Another suggestion is that 'Ogrestane' is more 'Ogreton' and that the personal name 'Ogier' is a Normanised version of the Scandinavian name 'Holger'. Brandleside may be a Scandinavian name and suggest that 'Brandale' was once the name of this valley.

It is recorded that even as late as "the time of Popery" the devotees of that religion, in doing penance, used to crawl on their knees round this stone and cry, O thou grit stane from a belief that the Deity was in a peculiar manner present at that hallowed relic. Farmers from Brandleside Farm were bound to protect, by not removing it or ploughing within a set distance of the stone, possibly because of a tradition of pagan burials around this monument. Some recollections of May Day events being held at the site are current and the site is listed and protected by Historic Scotland. A fine view of Dunlop or Borland Hill, the site of Dunlop Castle once held by the De Ross family, can be seen from the stone.

=== Monastic settlement ===
The history of the monastic settlement and the chapel of Saint Mary (NS 4080 5032) at the Thurgartstone is a parallel example to the Chapel Hill site at Chapeltoun, where a Christian centre was established to supplant the pagan significance of the site. Monastic cells, a chapel and a graveyard are all lost to view, constructed by the monks of Kilwinning, only the name 'Saint Mary's' given to the nearby 'modern' dwellings, built on the site of the chapel record past significance. Chapelhouse Farm is located beside the road nearby. The Holy Well still exists, the nearby houses pumping water up from its source. The water from the well used to run under the road and emerge in a trough surrounded by a metal fence. Only a concrete manhole indicates this trough now (2006). In 1856 the water for baptism in Dunlop Kirk was still drawn from this Holy Well.

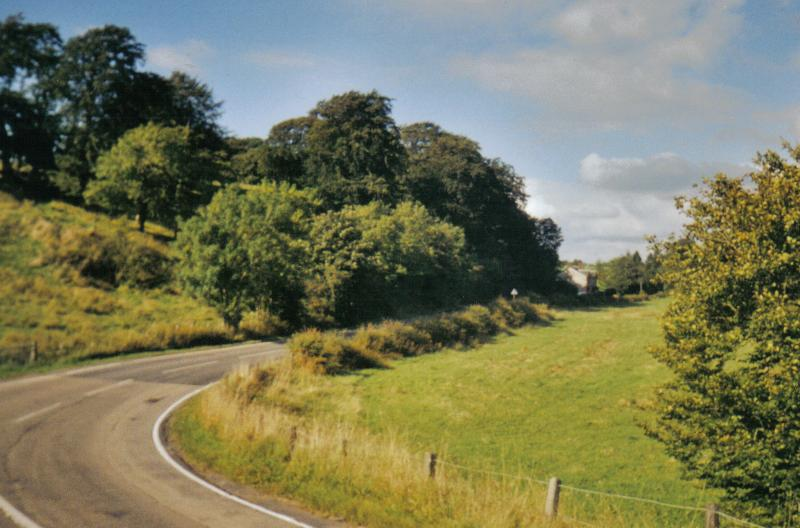
A view from Chapelhouse Bridge (Lady's Steps) of the Chapel Crags with St. Mary's House in the distance

The small chapel had an endowment for the support of a chaplain. It was abandoned at the time of the Reformation in Scotland led by the ex-Roman Catholic priest John Knox (1514 to 1572). The stones were robbed / mined by locals and the last remaining stones were taken away by a farmer in the 1830s. It stood on a rock from which a beautiful stream of water gushed into a small rivulet, this originally being crossed by steps, called the Lady's steps before the Chapelhouse Bridge was built. A carved relic of the old chapel, supposed to have been the font for holy water, was for some years used a trough for the pigs until it was finally broken up and used as building material. The Lady's Steps still existed in the late 1880s as they were on the path that ran from here to the Kirktoun of Dunlop Steps cut out of the rock face led up to the hill behind the chapel where the monk's graveyard was apparently located. Some stone relics from St Mary's were given to a member of the local Clement family and a christening font was discovered in the burn at Kirkwood Farm by another Clement. There artifacts are now kept at North Borland Farm.

The 1858 OS map locates the Lady's Steps near Hapland Mill on the Stewarton side of the town, crossing the Glazert. Patterson and Bayne, both local people writing in 1866 and 1935 respectively, place the steps at Chapel Crags. The first Statistical Account of Ayrshire also places the steps at Chapel Crags. It seems odd to name these steps after a chapel that is a significant distance away in another valley; a cartographers error explains the situation as recorded in the first OS Name Book. A field near the 'Druid Stone' is called Templecroft and the first Celtic ‘Culdee’ church may have been situated here, later replaced by the Roman Catholic Chapel. Ironically the pagan or Druidical stone is still there, but no sign of the Christian sites are visible, apart from the inconspicuous holy well in the field bordered by the burn.

== Craighead Law Hill ==
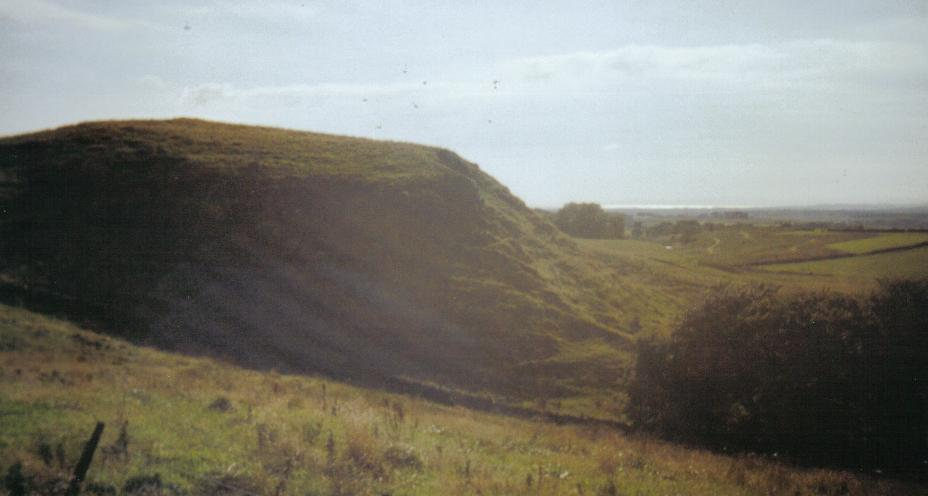
A view of Craighead Law, probably used as a Justice or Moot Hill. The drained Halket Loch is near here.

This Lea or Law hill, 687 ft (209 m) high, in the Lugton area of Dunlop Parish is supposed to be a 'moot' or trial hill. The arrangement of stones on its summit does not appear to be accidental and a grass covered cairn is very noticeable. A farmer from East Halket (pronounced 'whoreket') removed one of these to facilitate his ploughing. One stone on the summit has a vertical hole drilled to the depth of four feet or so, presumably to be used for ‘slot’ for a flagpole for flying a standard, a similar arrangement to that which existed at the Borestone at Greenhills near Beith. Near Aiket Castle is another Court Hill. Halket is called Hawkhead by Thomson on his map of 1832. Halket Loch covered about 10 acres (40,000 m^{2}) and was drained in the 1840s. It is shown on the early maps of Ayrshire. A photograph of 1913 shows a glacial erratic or such-like that was named the 'Lion Rock' as it had profile that resembled that animal. Craighead Law can be seen in the distance so it must have stood in the vicinity of the old Halket Loch.

== Grange ==
A monastic grange, probably belonging to Kilwinning Abbey, may have existed there before the Reformation as suggested by the numerous place names evidence, with Grangehill, Townhead of Grange, Mid Grange, South Grange, etc. A glebe field was also located there and an old drove road which ran past Carswell Farm and up to Paisley.

== The Battle of Boyd's or Craignaught Hill ==
Etymology
The name 'Craignaught' is derived from the Gaelic words 'Craig' (Rock) and 'Nochdta' (Naked), together literally mean 'Bare Rock' hill. Also recorded as Craighnaucht or Craignaugh.

Craignaught Hill lies in the north-east area of the Parish of Dunlop, the Clerkland Burn running beneath and on to Dunlop House. On the lower slopes of Craignaught Hill was fought a singularly unusual battle between the Boyds of Kilmarnock and the Stewarts of Darnley. Sir Alan Stewart had been treacherously slain by Sir Thomas Boyd; his brother Alexander Stewart, nicknamed 'buktuth' (having a large projecting tooth) was determined to take revenge. Sir Alan had been killed at Polmais Thorn when they met, supposedly under a truce.

Sir Thomas Boyd was surprised on the night of 7 July 1439, whilst riding past Craignaught on his way north and although outnumbered, he and his followers fought on, even taking agreed rest periods indicated by the sounding of a horn. The remaining Boyds placed themselves back to back, they closed up their ranks, and, forming a circle, they grimly set themselves to beat back the Stewarts or else die where they fought. Eventually and inevitably Sir Thomas Boyd was killed, whilst fighting Sir Alexander Stewart buktuth himself, stabbed in the back by a Stewart soldier, and a large number of his followers were also killed.

The name is given as Sir Robert Boyd in at least one version of the tale. The list of Stewarts involved is given as "..Alexander Stewart, buktuth, and his sonnis and Matthew Stewart with his brother and others syndry..."

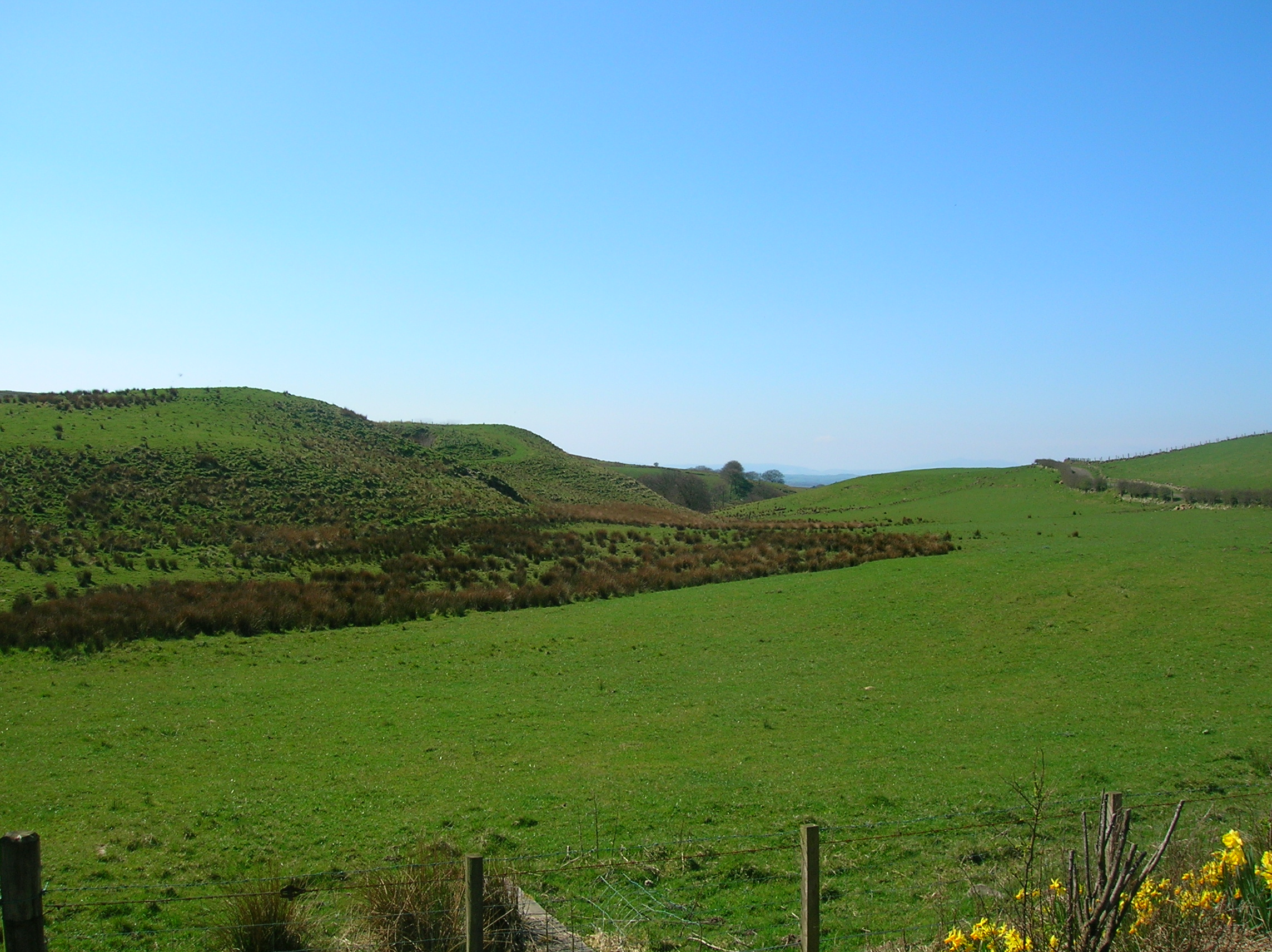
Boyd's Hill and Boyd's slack

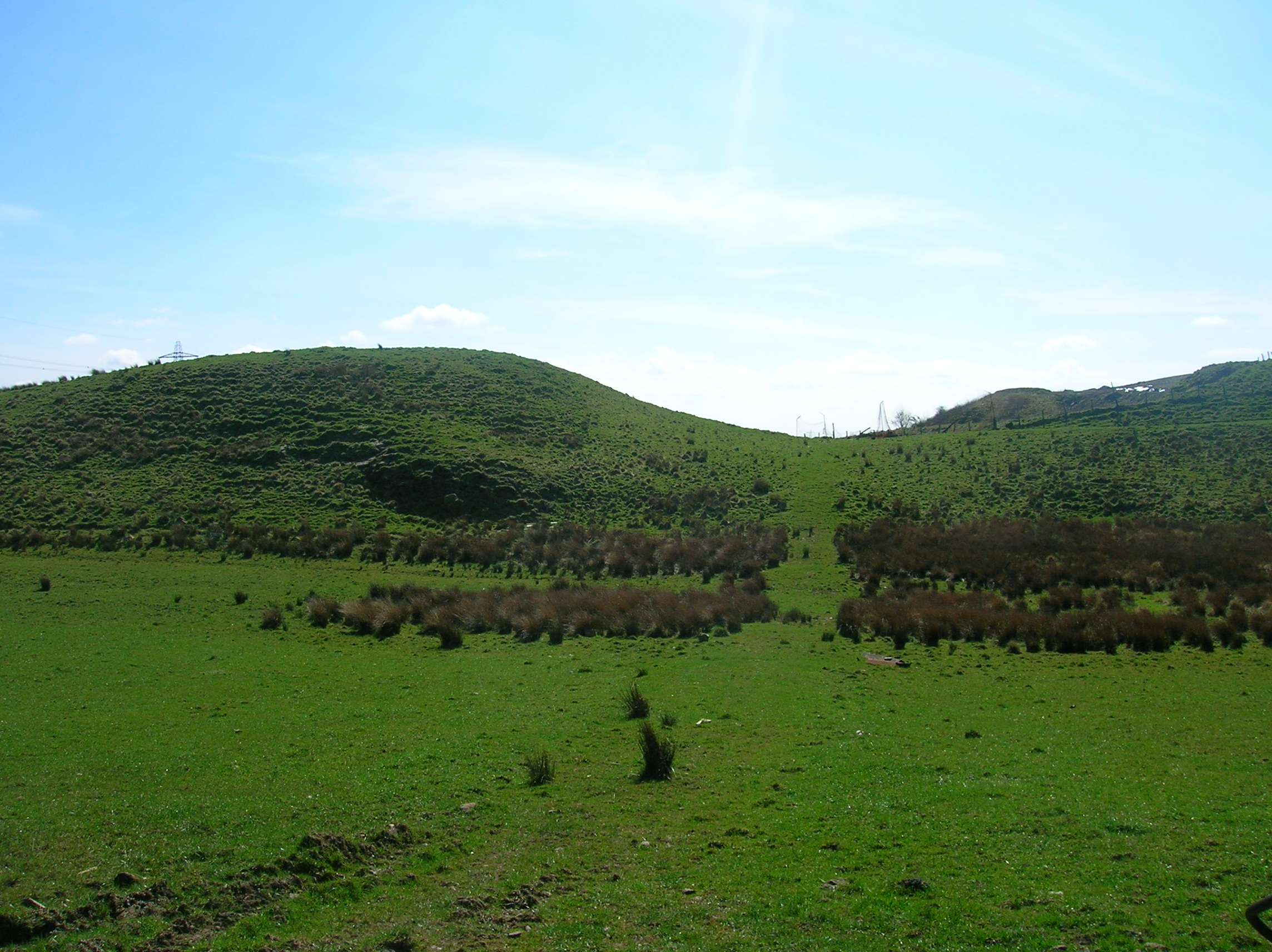
Boyd's Hill to the left and Boyd's slack

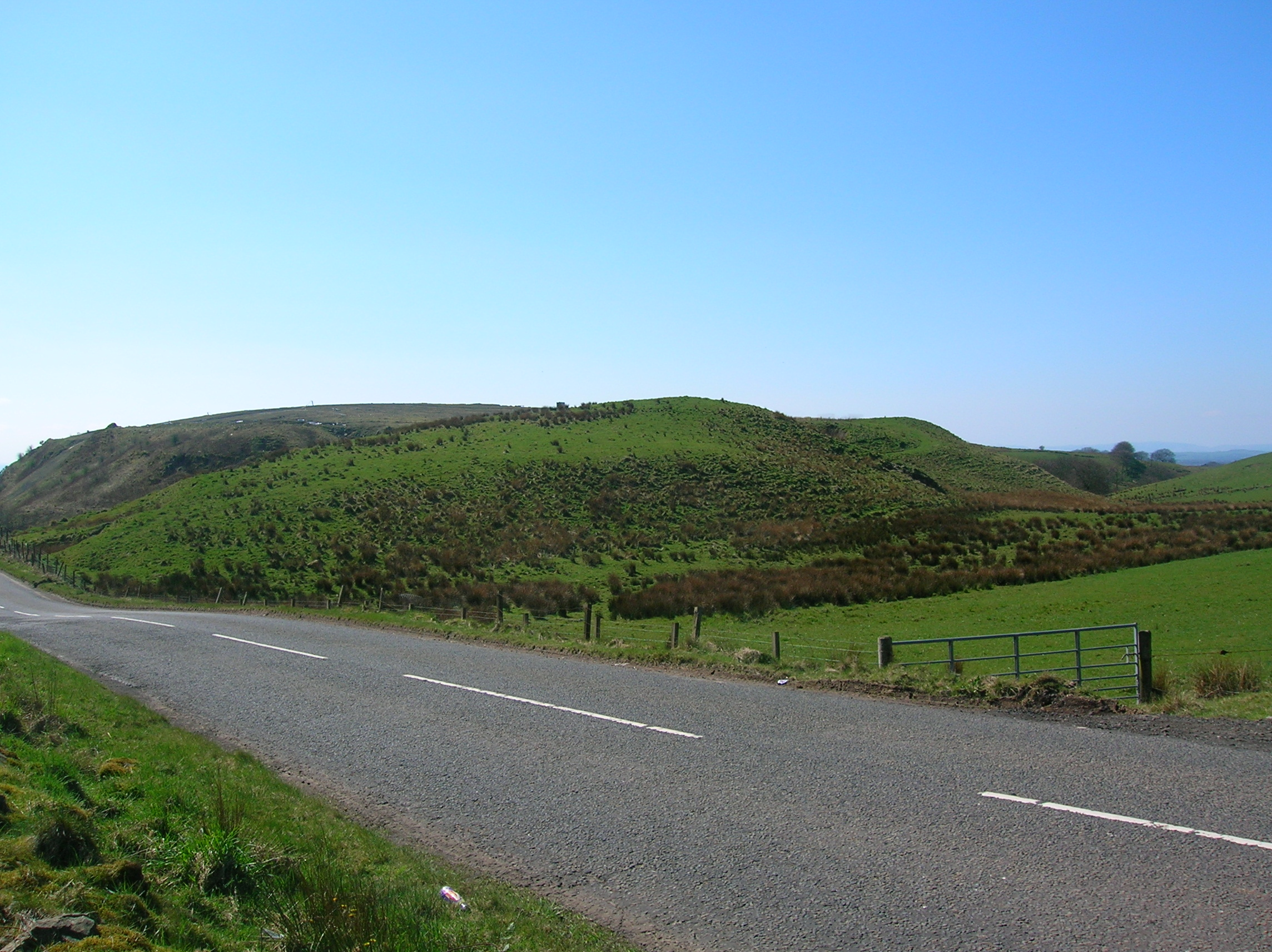
Boyd's Hill (foreground) and Craignaught Hill, looking south

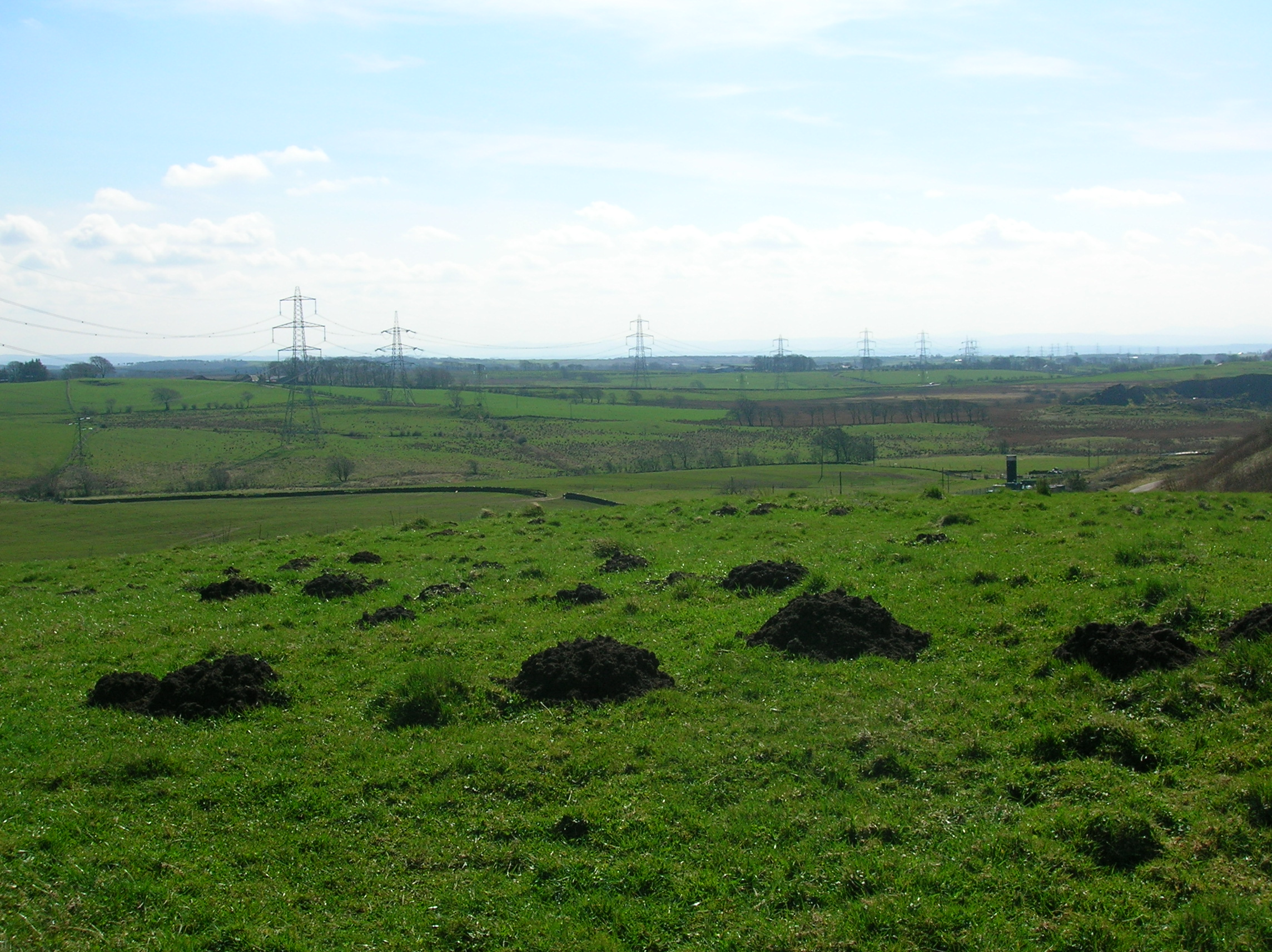
Boyd's Hill summit, looking south

The results of this encounter led to killings and counter killings which involved a great part of the West of Scotland. Boyd's wife had previously dreamed all of that which came to pass and died of grief within days of her husband death. The 1860 OS marks 'Boyd's Hill' and 'Boyd's slack', Scots for a narrow pass, to the north of Craignaught on the old lane to Grange Farm, now named South Grange.

Boyd's Hill has been left undamaged (2007) by the quarrying and domestic waste disposal operations at Craignaught and the Boyd's slack is also clearly identifiable.

Hugh Craig, author of "Ayrshire Aspirations in Verse and Prose" was born at Grange Farm, on the lands of which 'Boyd's Hill' stands, and he records that the place where the Stewart assassin hid was still pointed out in his day. He gives the date of the battle as July 9. 1439.

== The Gemmells of Templehouse ==
The Knights Templar are remembered in the name of this property, formally called the 'Templeland of Dunlop Hill' but known commonly as Templehouse which since 1570 was in the hands of the Gemmill or Gemmell family. In 1596 Patrick Gemmill resigned the Templelands of Dunlop Hill into the hands of the Superior, Lord Torphichen, in favour of his eldest son. The Sandilands, Lords Torphichen are remembered elsewhere, such as Sandilands Farm near Kennox, although the farm name has now been changed to Bankend. The Gemmells still held Templehouse in the 1960s. The house had a walled garden with formal gardens and paths. The house and gardens are now (datum 2020) ruins.

== The Lands of Hapland ==
Etymology
The name may be a corruption of 'Whaup Land'; a 'whaup' being Scots for a curlew.

Prior to 1549 Hapland was part of the estate of Dunlop. David Dunlop exchanged or 'excambied' Hapland for the lands of Borland and in 1612 Patrick Cunninghame sold these lands to Gabriel Porterfield, son of Alexander Porterfield of that Ilk. Gabriel Porterfield of Porterfield in 1618 married Mariot Crawfurd and inherited the lands of Gills, Lothrihill, the Templeland and Maynes (Mains) of Hapland, including the mansion house. Gabriel Porterfield also took possession of Dunlop Hill, Wattirland (Waterland) and Halketh, with the loch (now drained). Dobie relates that On 31 May 1638, Gabriel Porterfield purchased from Neil Ryburn of that Ilk the 13s 4d. land of old extent of Ryburn, commonly called Temple-Ryburn. The estate of Hapland consisted of Brokwelmure (Brockwellmuir), Dunlophill-Montgomerie and Ryburn; later part of Lainshaw was purchased as well.

The Laird of Hapland was the ruling elder in the Parish of Dunlop in 1649 and was a captain in the Scots army when Cromwell was in Scotland, for which his lands were sequestrated. The last of the male line died when he fell off his horse when returning from Stewarton about 1765 or 1770. Lillias Porterfield married William Somerville of Kennox. Their youngest child, a daughter, married Colonel McAlester, Laird of Loup, in Kintyre. A descendant built Chapelton House near Stewarton. Hapland is near Dunlop. In 1820 the estate was of 200 acres (0.81 km^{2}) and the proprietor was Lieutenant-General Alexander Trotter. The old mansion house was demolished around 1876 as it was not in keeping with the modern age. A new steading was built at the site, possibly the 'Newhouse' marked on the OS maps. Some of the old tree wind-breaks and policies of the estate can still be made out. It seems likely that Temple-Ryburn had its name changed to Hapland at around this time as the OS of 1858 shows Ryburn in the same position as later maps (1897, etc.) show Hapland.

== Mains Quarry ==
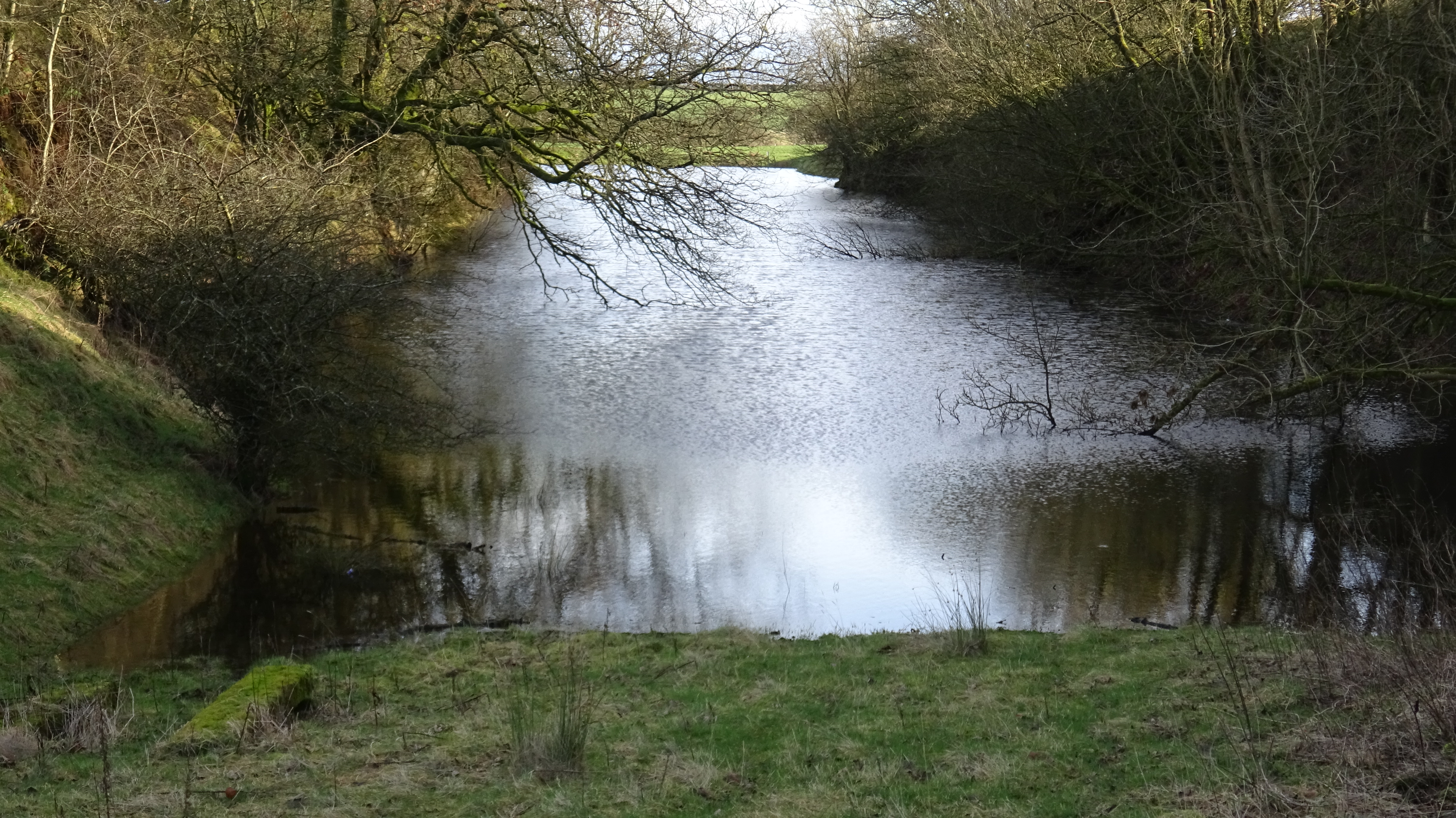
The flooded Mains Quarry

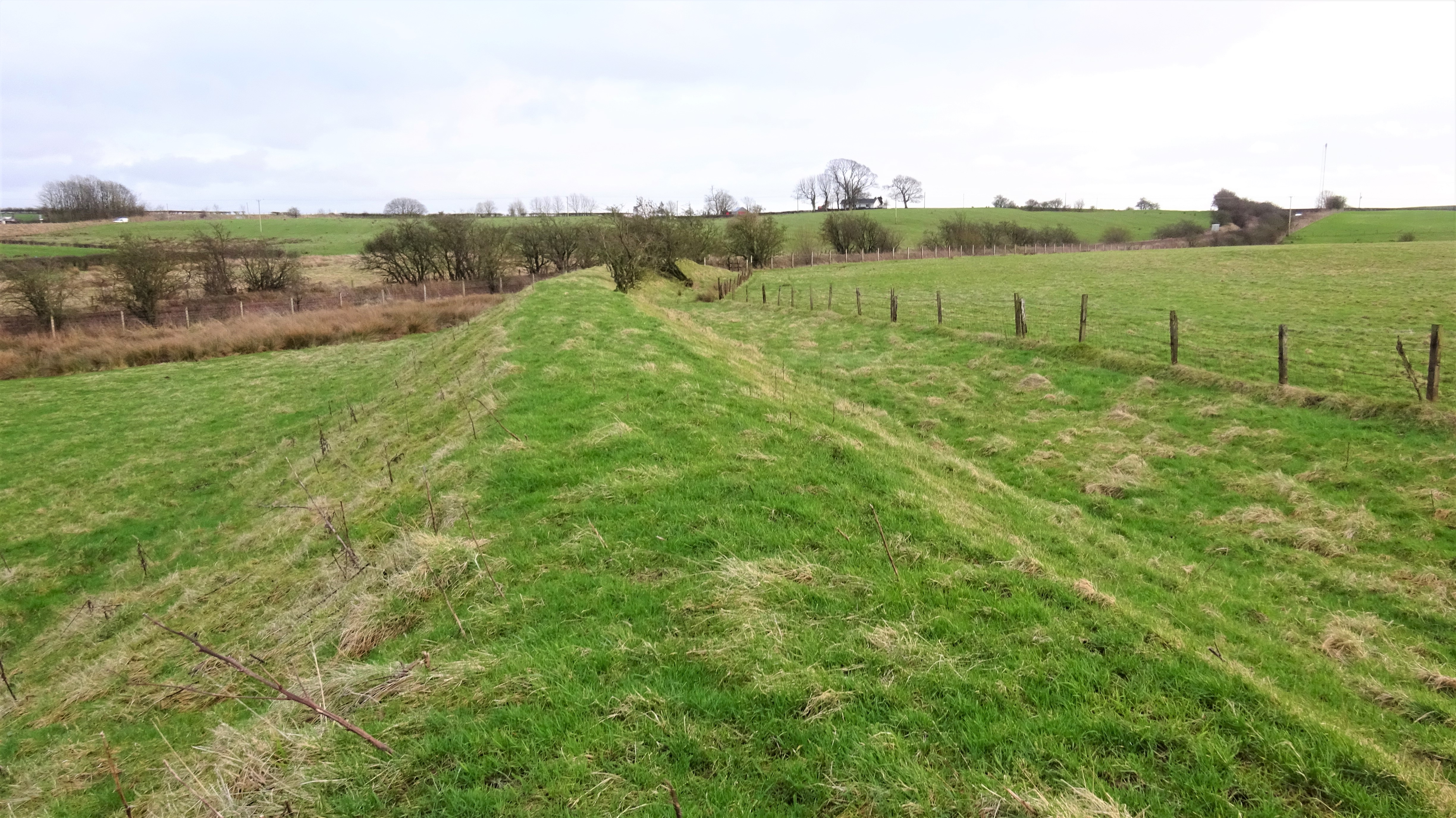
A section of the old tramway embankment

The Mains Quarry siding lay between Dunlop and the Gameshill road overbridge on the old G&SWR double track line running towards Stewarton. It was a single siding running parallel to the main line towards the road overbridge. The processed whinstone stone was carried to the siding by a narrow gauge tramway, raised for approximately half its length on a narrow embankment running for a total of just over 1000 ft (305m) from the Mains Quarry buildings.

The quarry and its tramway lay to the west of the main line between the farms of South Netherhouses and Mains of Aiket. Quarrying had already taken place at Mains since at least 1856 and thus prior to the 1871 opening of the G&SWR line.

The quarry's narrow gauge line is recorded as a tramway on the 1909–1910 25-inch-to-the-mile OS map, by which time it appears to have already become disused as no infrastructure is shown where it reaches the siding, although the standard gauge private siding itself is still shown running down towards the road overbridge at that date. A section of lifted track and trackbed may be represented by dotted lines on the map, lying parallel to the private siding.

It is not obvious how the stone was transferred however it is clear that the narrow gauge line lay some height above the private siding at the point where they met. A signal post is shown to the south of this siding's point work and what may have been a ground frame stands nearby.

The tramway line curved tightly away from the main line and then ran westwards in a straight line, parallel to the sides of the quarry to the site of the old quarry buildings, where the line seems to have forked. The quarry covered around three acres at this date, however later maps show that it was still being worked and road transport used, before being finally abandoned and allowed to flood.

== Micro-history ==
In 1820, Dunlop had only two people qualified to vote by right as freeholders.

A new gravitational water supply was opened for Dunlop in 1896, fed from a spring at Sidehead, the old water supply having been condemned.

Dunlop and Stewarton both stand on the old turnpike, completed from Glasgow by Lugton, to Kilmarnock, Irvine and Ayr in 1820 at the cost of £18,000.

Dunlop Cattle are said to have originated within the parish, bred by Dunlop of that Ilk from improved stock from Holland in around 1550 to 1700 or later. The breed, also known as Cunninghame or Ayrshire cattle, are pied, white and brown, short in leg, long in the horn, straight in the back: the bulls are fiery in temper. The cow are peculiarly placid and docile, producing milk which is very high in butterfat.

The lands of Netherhill were purchased by John Love of Threepwood in the early 19th century.

== Freemasonry ==
Freemasonry in Dunlop started in the early 19th century. On 4 May 1824 a charter was granted to the brethren of Dunlop to practise Freemasonry and this continued for many years as Lodge Dunlop Caledonian No 311. It was declared dormant in 1881 since no communications had been received by Grand Lodge for more than seven years. The only known record from Lodge Caledonian No 311 is that the first master was a John Gemmell, the first secretary was Robert Fulton and the lodge colours were crimson with a tartan trim.

On 19 October 1944 a meeting was held in the public school by the local schoolmaster, Mr Peter Calderwood, who was a member of Lodge St John Maybole no 11, and 38 others who were members of various Lodges within and outwith Ayrshire.

Several letters were exchanged between Grand Lodge and Peter Calderwood until on 29 March 1945 a meeting was held in the public hall chaired by Bro. Joseph Johnston, a past master of Stewarton Thistle, to elect the office-bearers for the new lodge. A letter was sent to Edinburgh (Grand Lodge of Scotland) along with a list of 110 petitioners on 20 April and a charter was granted. Unfortunately because of the number of lapsed years they could not get the original number or colours. The colours today are green with gilt trim.

The Erection and Consecration of the new Lodge, Lodge Dunlop Caledonia No 1408, took place in Dunlop Public hall on 3 November 1945. There was a large assembly of brethren, including many deputations from 48 lodges within and outwith Ayrshire. A total of 341 brethren signed the attendance book to witness Bro. Joseph Johnston installed as the first Master of Lodge Dunlop Caledonia No 1408 by Lieut. Col. Wallace Cunningham of Ayrshire.

A collection taken for the Lodge benevolence amounted to £34.6s.

After the meeting 110 brethren sat down to a meal at a cost of 6 shillings (30p) per head. At a meeting held on 22 November Mr William Stevenson, Archiebald Howie and Archibald Baillie were the first candidates of the new lodge. By now the lodge was well on its way with a total of 229 candidates having passed through up to the present day.

Throughout Scotland nine lodges have the Caledonian in their title, and on 24 September 1983 the first of the annual ‘Caledonian Gatherings’ was held at Annan by Lodge Caledonian Annan No 238 supported by Caledonian St John Lennoxtown No 195, Caledonian Dundee No 254, St Mary's Caledonian Inverness No 339, The Caledonian Railway (Glasgow) No 354, Motherwell Caledonian No 1228, Caledonian Lodge of Uganda (Edinburgh) No 1228 and Caledonian Dunlop No 1408. Each lodge takes its turn to host the annual event, with Dunlop Caledonia No 1408 hosting it for the third time on 19 September 2016

The lodge meets on the second Thursday of the month - October to May - with the exception of September - 1st Saturday.

== See also ==
- Barony of Aiket
- Lands of Borland
- Stewarton
- Castle and Barony of Robertland
- Dunlop railway station
- Halket Loch
