= Dunlop Castle =

Castle near Stewarton, East Ayrshire, Scotland

Location
- Coordinates: 55.7117°N 4.5047°W

Site history
- Built: 14th century

Dunlop Castle was a 14th-century castle, about 2.5 miles (4.0 km) north of Stewarton, East Ayrshire, Scotland. A large Jacobean-style house, Dunlop House, was built on the site in 1833.

The castle may be known alternatively as Hunthall.

== History ==
The property belonged to the Dunlops from the 13th century.

== Structure ==
There is no record of the structure of the castle. It was described as “"an ancient strong house fortified with a deep foussie [ditch] of water". There was a stone dated 1599 over the doorway (and it was transferred to the present house; it is inscribed, “"O Lord let ever thy blessings remain within this house".

== Tradition ==
Dunlop cheese is said to have originated here,

== See also ==
- Castles in Great Britain and Ireland
- List of castles in Scotland
