= Barbara Gilmour =

Scottish women who used a different method in cheese making

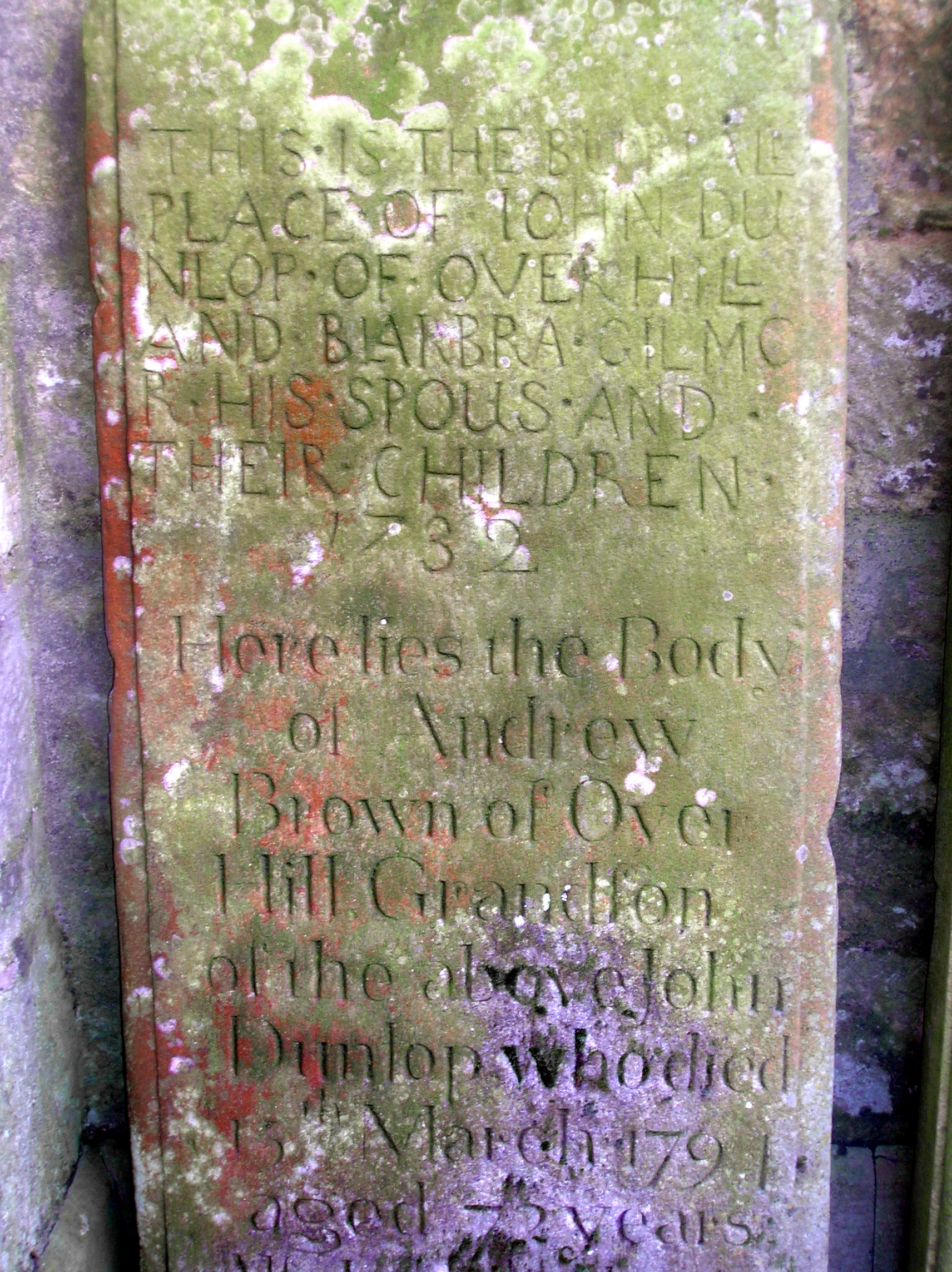
- Barbara Gilmour's Gravestone
- Died: 1732; Dunlop, East Ayrshire
- Burial: Dunlop
- Spouse: John Dunlop
- Issue More: Mary Dunlop
Names
- Barbara Gilmour

Barbara Gilmour (married name Barbara Dunlop; died 1732) was a significant figure in 17th century Ayrshire having introduced a method of cheese making which became common throughout Ayrshire and beyond, providing employment and extra income for farmers and others. She lived near Dunlop, a village in East Ayrshire, Scotland, lying between the village of Lugton and the town of Stewarton on the old turnpike road to Glasgow. Cheese made by her method became known as "Dunlop cheese".

== Early life ==
Barbara Gilmour was a woman whose wits had been sharpened by her exile as a presbyterian in Ireland around 1660, during Scotland's troubles between the Restoration of Charles II and the dirk & drublie dayis after the revolution. In Ireland she is thought to have learned the art of making whole milk cheese. She may have been in the Bantry Bay area, County Cork, where James Hamilton, 1st Viscount Claneboye was at one time based. Hamilton was a strong presbyterian adherent and son of Hans Hamilton the first Protestant minister of Dunlop Kirk. McMichael states that she was in County Down, Northern Ireland.

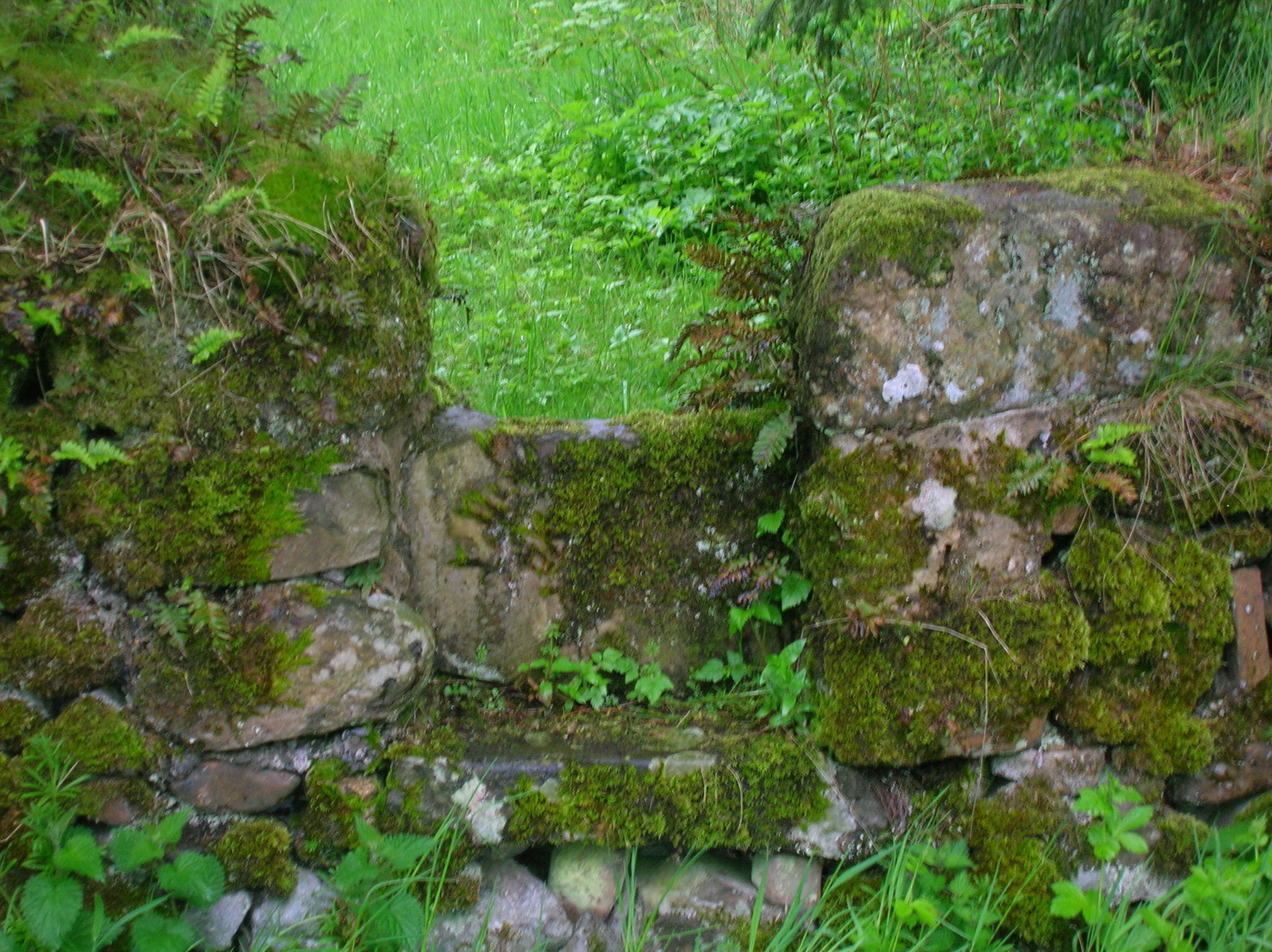
An old stile at 'The Hill' farm.

It is not known precisely where she came from, however "Gilmore" or "Gilmour" is a common local name, with for example a family of that name living in the Lands of Chapeltoun at around the start of the 18th century.

Another source states that she was a pious young woman–a devout Covenanter–and, hearing of the martyrdom of Margaret Wilson (in 1684 or 1685) on Wigtown Sands, and being determined not to renounce the Covenant, she fled, like many others, from her home in Ayrshire to Ireland, and found employment in County Down, where she acquired a knowledge of the Irish process of cheese making. The persecution of females having abated after the horrible event of Wigtown Sands, Miss Gilmour returned to her home in Dunlop, and became a farmer's wife.

== Career ==
Eventually, according to the Rev. Brisbane (1793), she returned to Dunlop, East Ayrshire, after the Revolution of 1688, bringing the recipe for the cheese with her; McMichael has it that she combined the best of Scottish and Irish cheese making methods to produce Dunlop cheese. Paterson records that she was the wife of John Dunlop, the farmer of Overhill Farm, now known as The Hill. Introducing a new style of cheese was not straightforward and, some of the locals adamant that cheese could not be made from whole milk, came close to accusing her of witchcraft which could have resulted in her being burned to death at the Cross of Irvine.

Some accused her of copying their recipes and indeed a farmer, Mr W. Aiton of Strathaven, pointed out that practical cheese makers were already aware of the benefit of adding cream to cheese before Barbara's time, and in his opinion Dunlop cheese was so named from a trader who took these cheeses from the parish up to Glasgow. Others have cast doubt on the Irish origin of the recipe without disputing Barbara Gilmour's introduction of Dunlop cheese.

== The cheese presses ==
Most sources, e.g. Dobie state that "Barbara's Gilmours cheese press can still be seen today at The Hill", however the cheese press there is dated 1760 and she died in 1732. The design of the press, with a heavy lintel stone having a screwed shaft passing through it attached to a frame, allowed the dead weight of the stone to be lowered onto the cheese progressively, improving the overall drainage of the whey and the firming up of the curd.

Another stone at the farm may represent the remains a primitive cheese press. It is an expertly carved trough with various holes, grooves and three vertical sides. The groove running horizontally along the back may have helped support a wooden frame above the trough. It may have been re-used for a different purpose at a later date and is unlikely to have been part of the 1760 press.

== The Hill cheese presses, 2007 ==
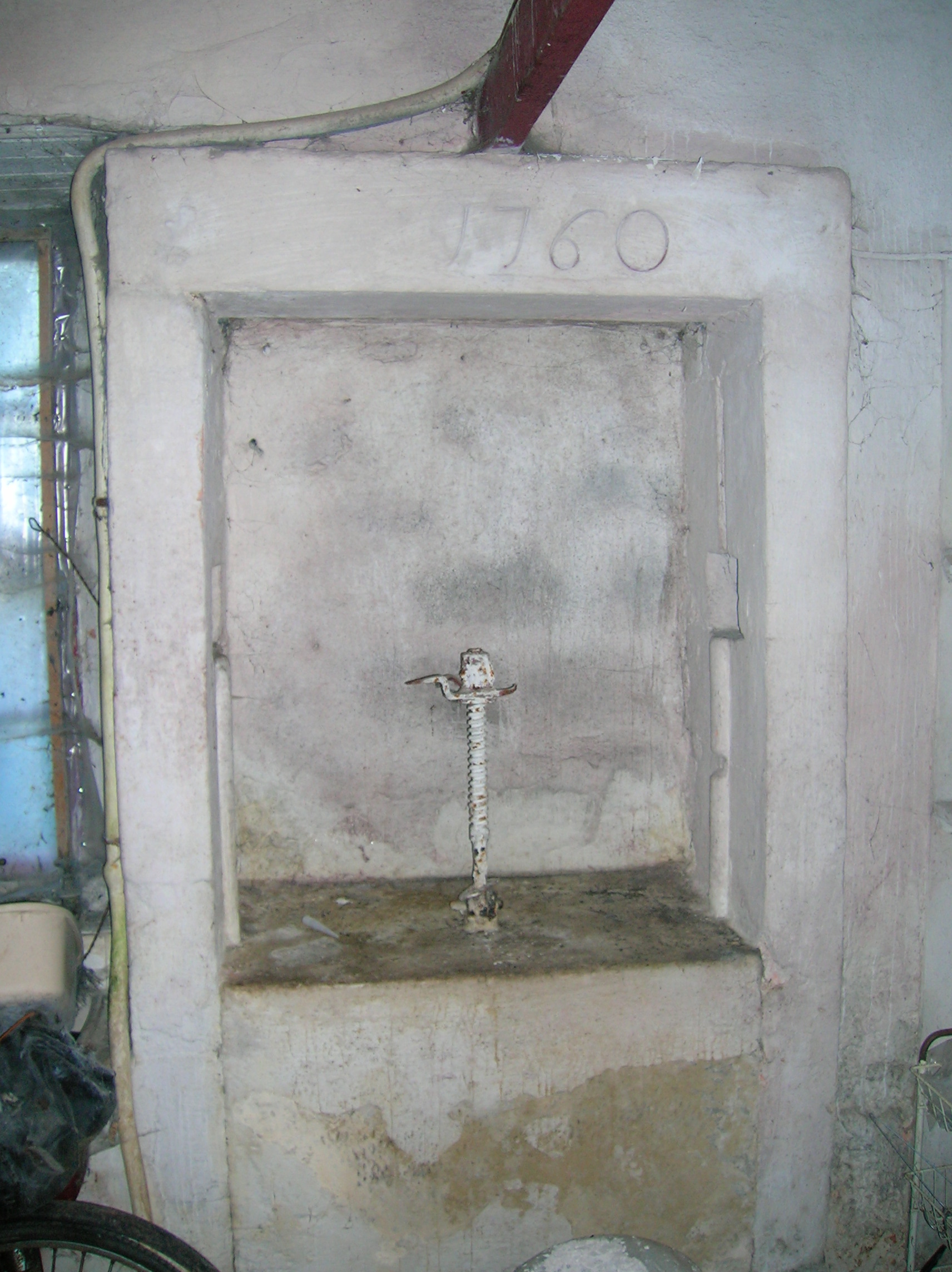
The substantially complete cheese press dated 1760.

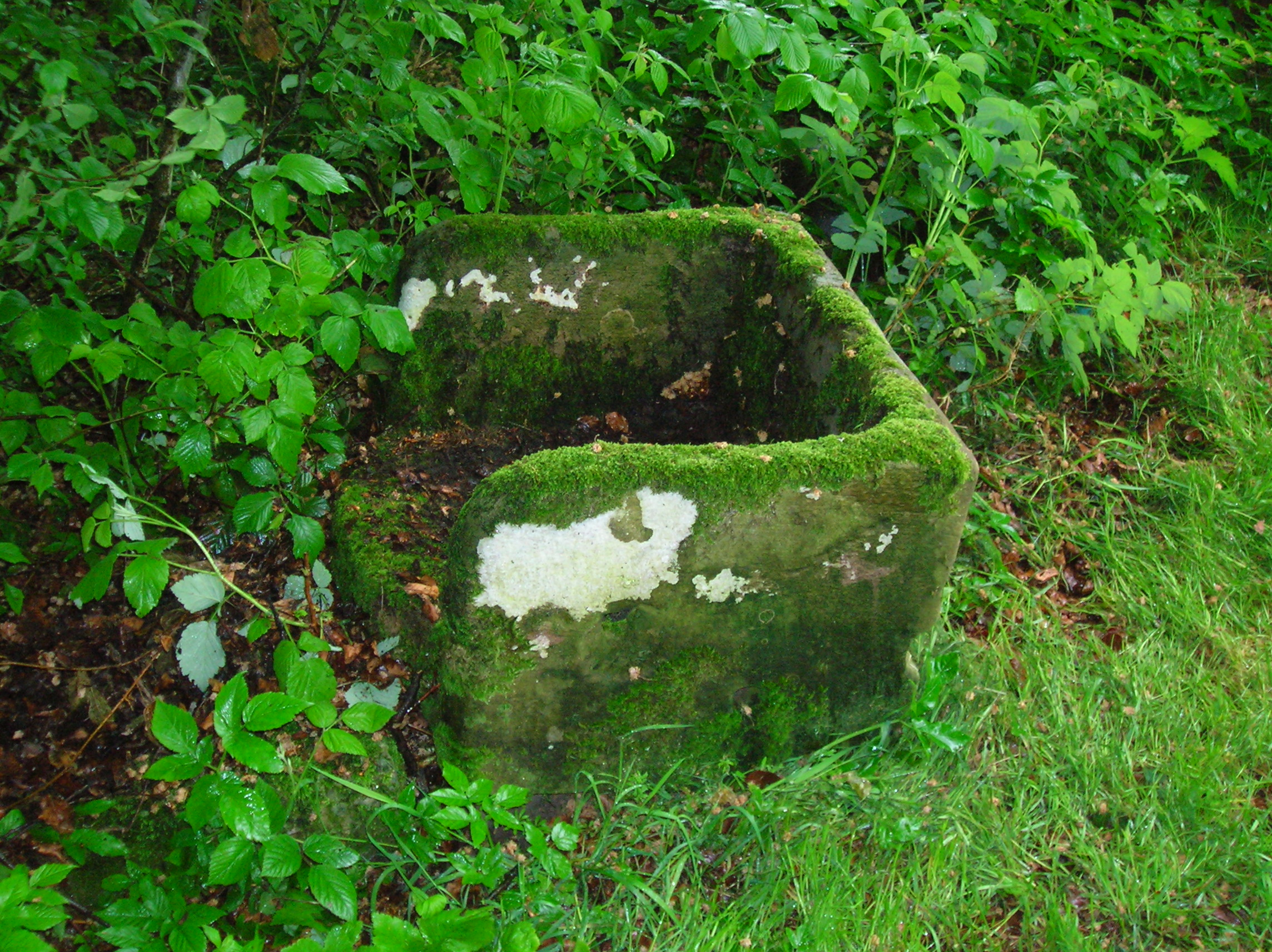
View of the possible primitive cheese press.

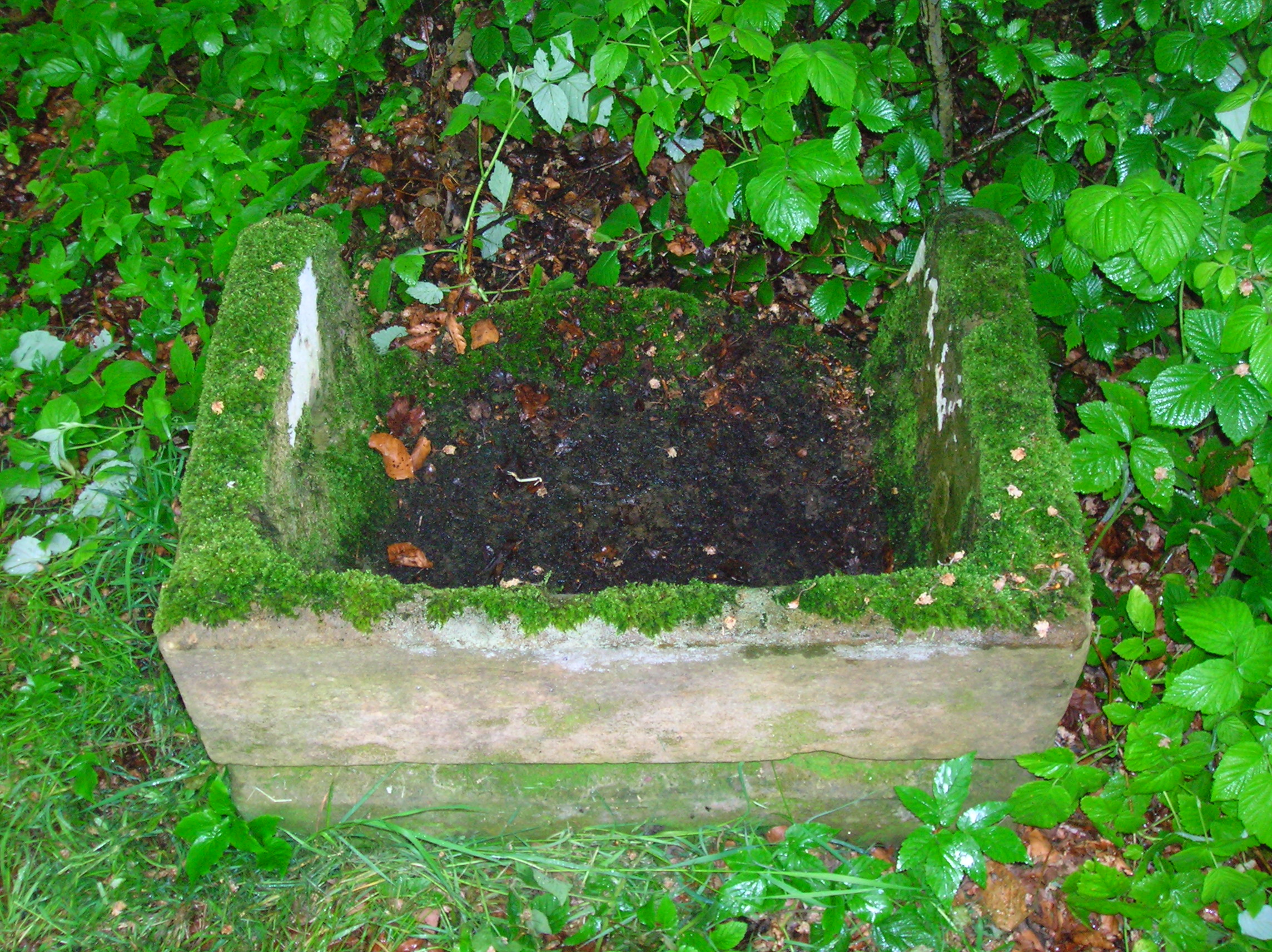
'Back' view of the possible primitive cheese press with the horizontal groove for supporting a wooden framework.

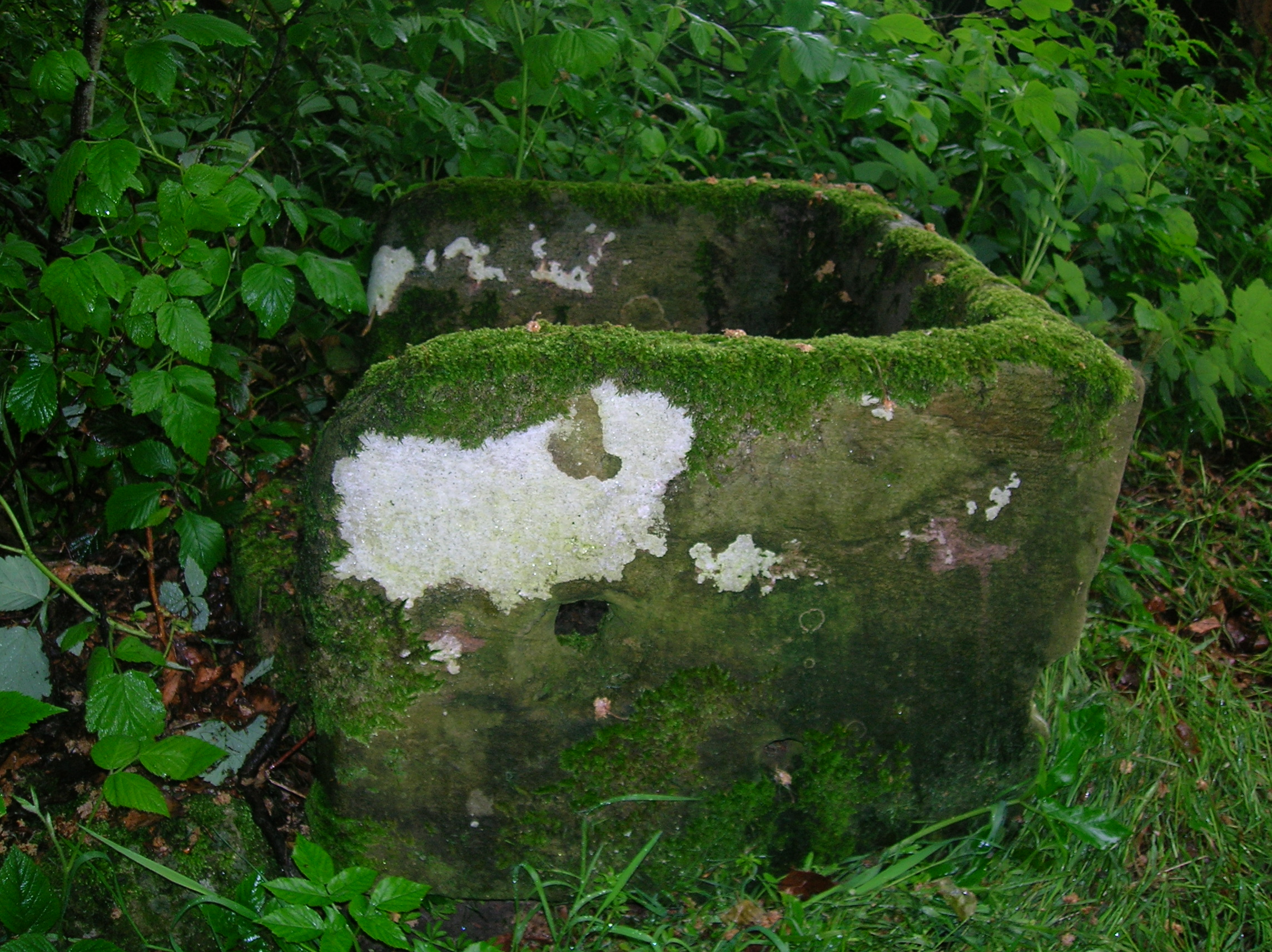
'Side' view of the possible primitive cheese press with holes visible.

== The Hill farm and the old road ==
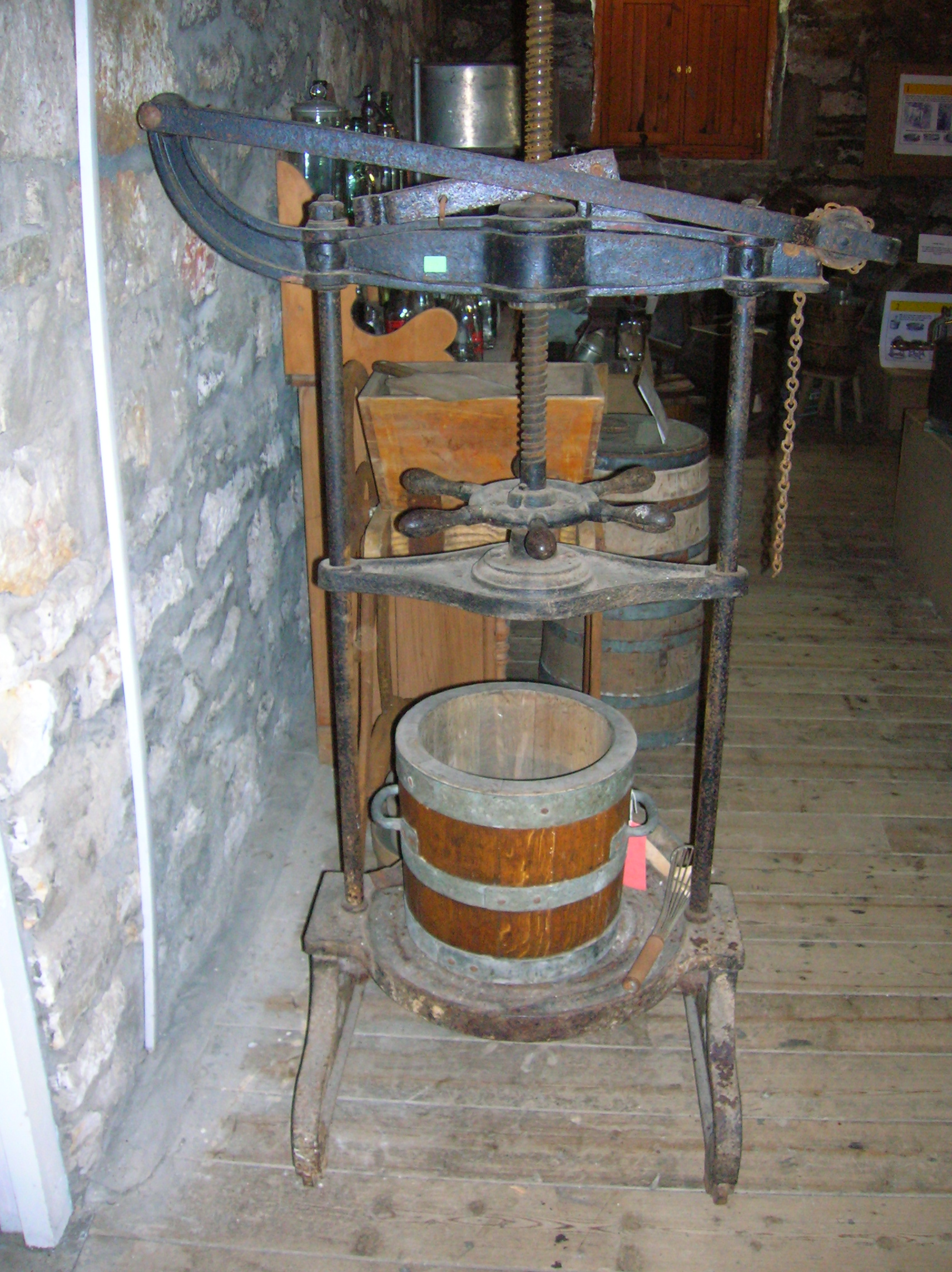
A cheese press and chessett from Dalgarven Mill

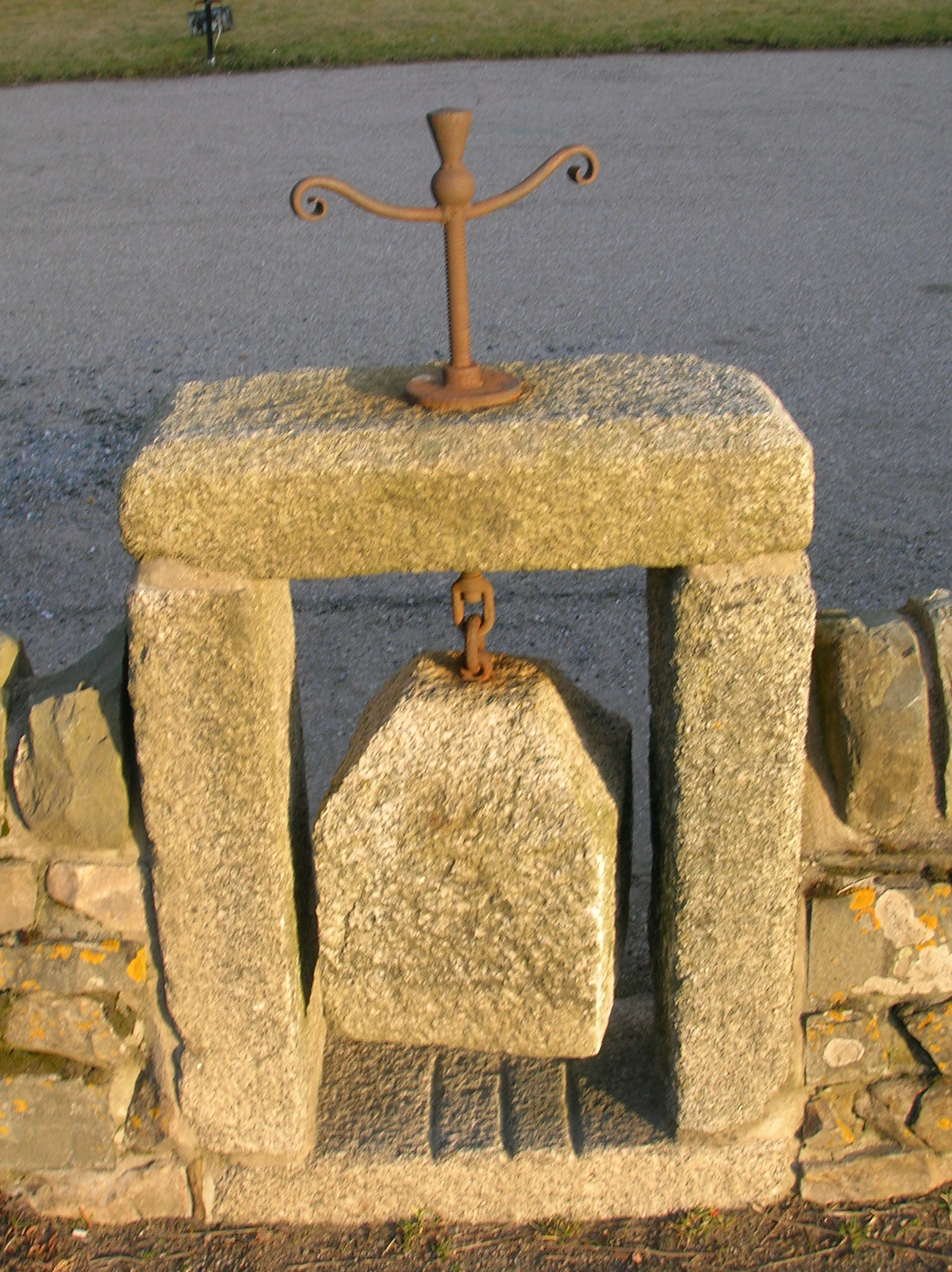
An old cheese press from Strathspey

This farmstead, previously known as Over Dunlophill Montgomerie, has a U-shaped plan and has been little modernised since the 19th century, leaving evidence for earlier phases plainly visible. The farm buildings comprise a two-storied farmhouse flanked to the south by stables, a harness room and a forge and to the north by a byre and a dairy. A barn and a cart shed are in a detached range to the rear east of the main block and a small watermill is to the north, adjacent to the dairy. The farmstead is built of whinstone rubble and has slate roofs. It was visited by the RCAHMS in 1993. In the surrounding fields can be seen the earthworks of a rig, some of which is slightly reverse-S in plan. The farm buildings are notable, if not exceptional, for the numerous date stones and marriage stone incorporated into various parts of the buildings.

The 17th-century road from Glasgow to Irvine ran past The Hill farm on the opposite side to the existing road, which is itself on the line of the 18th-century turnpike. The house used to face the other direction as can be seen by a slight asymmetry in the existing frontage and the old front door is now a just a window, but with tell-tale ornamentation on the lintel. The presence of the road as it was then, running past the farm, would have made the transport of her cheeses that much easier in those days of transport by pack animal or sledge. Timothy Pont's map of Cunninghame (1604–1608) marks an "O Hill", emphasising the age of this settlement.

== Gravestone and descendants ==
Barbara and John's table style horizontal gravestone is now positioned as an upright against a wall of Dunlop kirk. It is very well preserved and as stated, gives the date 1732 for her demise. The gravestone inscription mentions children plural, however only a daughter, Mary, survived her parents, marrying Allan, son of Allan Brown of Gabroch-Hill. Their son, Andrew Brown, succeeded to Hill, and through his wife Jean Anderson, they afterwards succeeded to Craighead farm. Mary Dunlop, daughter of John Dunlop of Boarland and Jean Gilmour of Tailend, had the half of Boarland, died at The Hill, the property of her mother's brother-in-law, in 1839. The Rev. Brisbane noted in 1793 that Barbara's grandson was still living and was the proprietor at 'The Hill.'

== Dunlop cheese ==
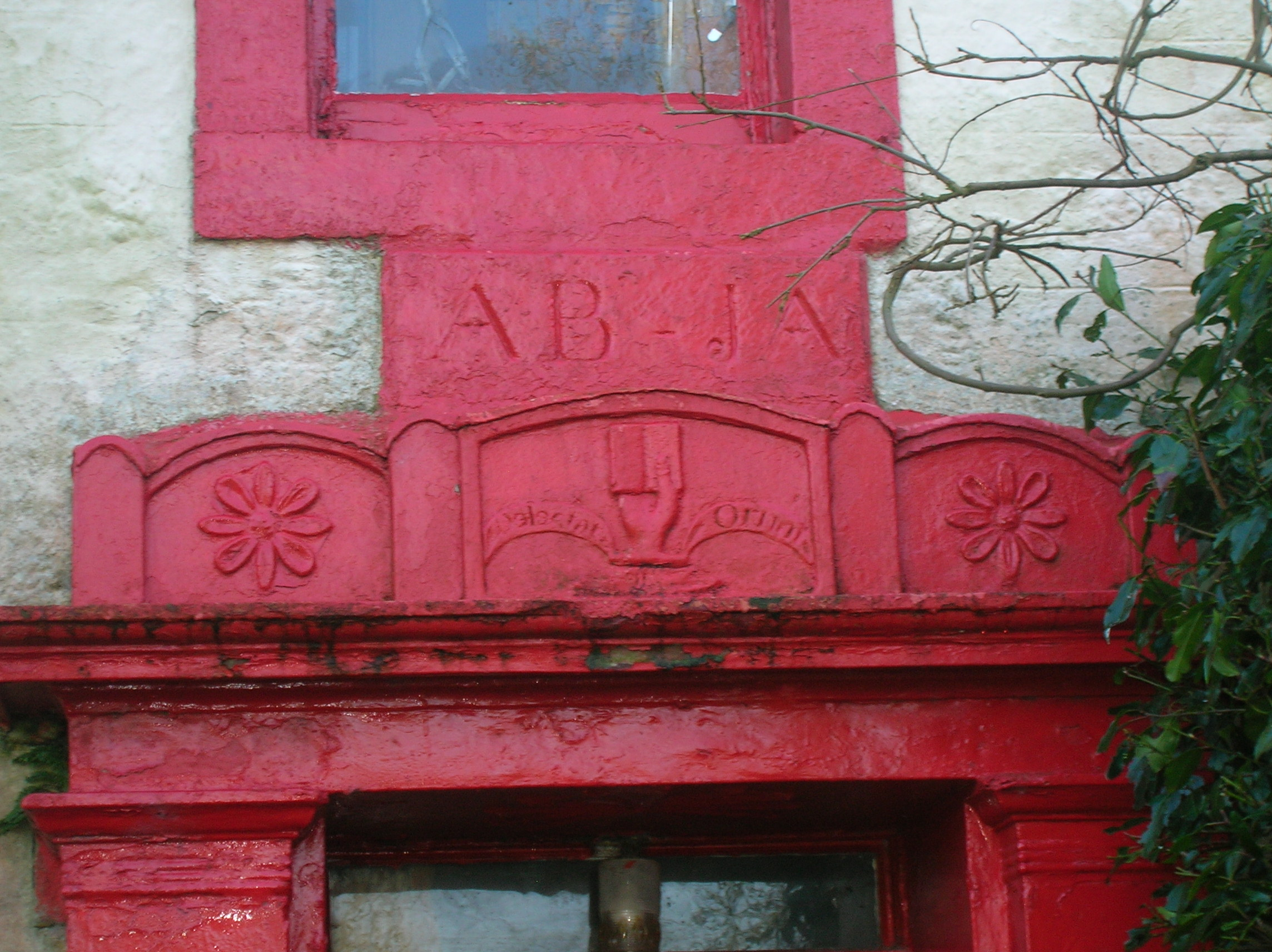
A view of the 'Marriage stone' positioned over the entrance to The Hill mansion house together with the Brown family motto "Delights and Adorns" (Psalm 149) and a Bible held in a heraldic Hand dexter held upright, possibly suggesting a link with both Northern Ireland and Protestantism. Jean Anderson of Craighead married Andrew Brown and lived at The Hill

Barbara successfully manufactured a species of cheese until then unknown in Scotland, being made from unskimmed milk from the famous Ayrshire cows. Her process was copied by her neighbours and Dunlop cheese came into such demand, that whether made by Barbara or her neighbours, or by the housewives of adjoining parishes, it found a ready market. It is suggested that the spread of the cheese to other districts was largely through farmers who had settled there from Dunlop parish.

She was something of an evangelist in the matter of making "sweet milk" (unskimmed milk) cheese, and being a forthright and energetic character she traveled widely to teach the making of her Dunlop cheese, and so stimulated a nationwide demand. This demand stimulated merchants to visit Cunninghame, buy Dunlop cheese and sell it throughout the central lowlands of Scotland. Local cheese merchants from Kirktoun also bought up the cheese and took them to Glasgow for sale in the markets.

Barbara's system for making Dunlop was widely copied and extended rapidly to many all parts of Scotland by the end of the 18th century, even where traditionally sheep's milk cheese had been made. Nothing but skimmed milk had been used in the process of cheese making in this district, previously. All the cheese similarly made in the western counties received the appellation of "Dunlop" and in 1837 the Ayrshire Statistical Account records that 25,000 stones imperial were made in this parish annually.

The high value which was set on the Barbara Gilmour cheese for the purpose of roasting was very much confined to Ayrshire, where a farl of oat cake or supple scone spread with roasted cheese, and a bowl of milk, or whey, or tea, or cold water, made a highly relished and substantial meal, precluding in many families the use of bacon for breakfast.

=== Cadgers ===
Cadgers were the middlemen who toured the farms and bought the cheeses by direct negotiation, sending them to the markets in Glasgow, Edinburgh and other places. By 1837 some fourteen cadgers made a living in Dunlop Parish through buying and selling Dunlop cheese.

In the long maturing stage Dunlop cheese loses very considerably in weight, which made dealers impatient to get it off their hands; and it was usually therefore retailed before it was ripe, and at an inferior price.

=== A poem ===
Receipt for Making Dunlop cheese
"On Tuesday morning at the peep of light,
Take all the milk that has stood overnight,
and, by the lustre of the dawning beam,
With a clean clam shell, skim off all the cream,
And from her lazy bed the dairy maid
Be sure to rise, and call her to your aid;
With rosy cheeks and hands as soft as silk,
Bid her hang on the pot and warm the milk,
Let not her heat it with too great a lowe,
But make it tepid, as warm from the cow;
Restore the cream, and put in good strong steep,
But through the molsy first let the milk dreep.
Now pay a due attention to my words;
And press, O gently press, the snow white curds;
Nor mash them small, (now mark well what I say)
Till you have squeez'd out almost all the whey.
Light be the weight for hours, one, two, or three,
And then the pressure may augmented be,
Oft change the clouts, and when the cheese is dried,
Send for the Parish Minister to Try't.

Written by the Rev. Hamilton Paul circa 1800 – 1820.

== Ayrshire or Dunlop cattle ==
Robertson's early 19th century map of Ayrshire showing 'The Hill' just outside Dunlop village.

Dunlop cattle are supposed to have originated here or within the parish, bred by J. Dunlop of that Ilk from improved stock from Holland, in around 1550 to 1700 or later. J. Dunlop of Titwood is said to have first bred 'Ayrshire Cows' at one of his home farms. The breed, also known as Cunninghame or Ayrshire cattle are pied, white and brown, short in leg, long in the horn, straight in the back: the bulls are fiery in temper and the cows are peculiarly placid and docile. They produce milk which is very high in butterfat and ideal for cheese-making. The milk has a high protein content and is relatively homogenous.

It is an interesting point to note that the selective breeding of cattle was almost impossible before the enclosure of land by dykes and ditches in the 18th-century, because prior to this the cattle were free to mix without much control from the farmer and establishing or maintaining a pure breed was therefore practically impossible.

== Micro history ==
The British army and navy of this time purchased Barbara Gilmour's Dunlop type of cheese as the taste of cheeses made from skimmed milk when compared with unskimmed cheeses was so unsatisfactory that it caused dissent amongst the regular troops and sailors.

In the 17th century Dunlop had two fairs a year for the sale of dairy stock, one on the second Friday of May; and the other called Hallowday, on 12 November.

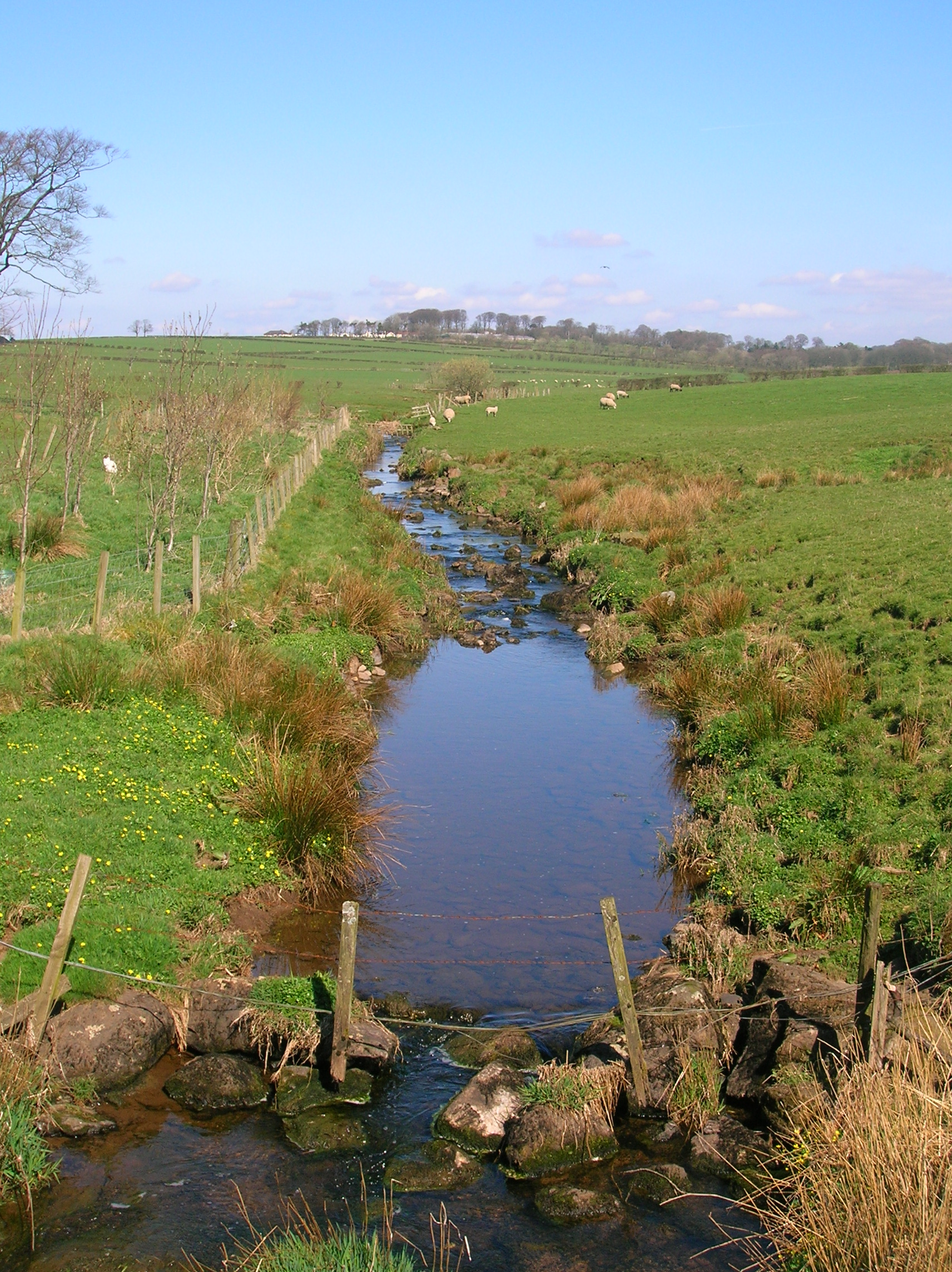
The Clerkland Burn at Clerkland West farm, looking towards Dunlop, 2007

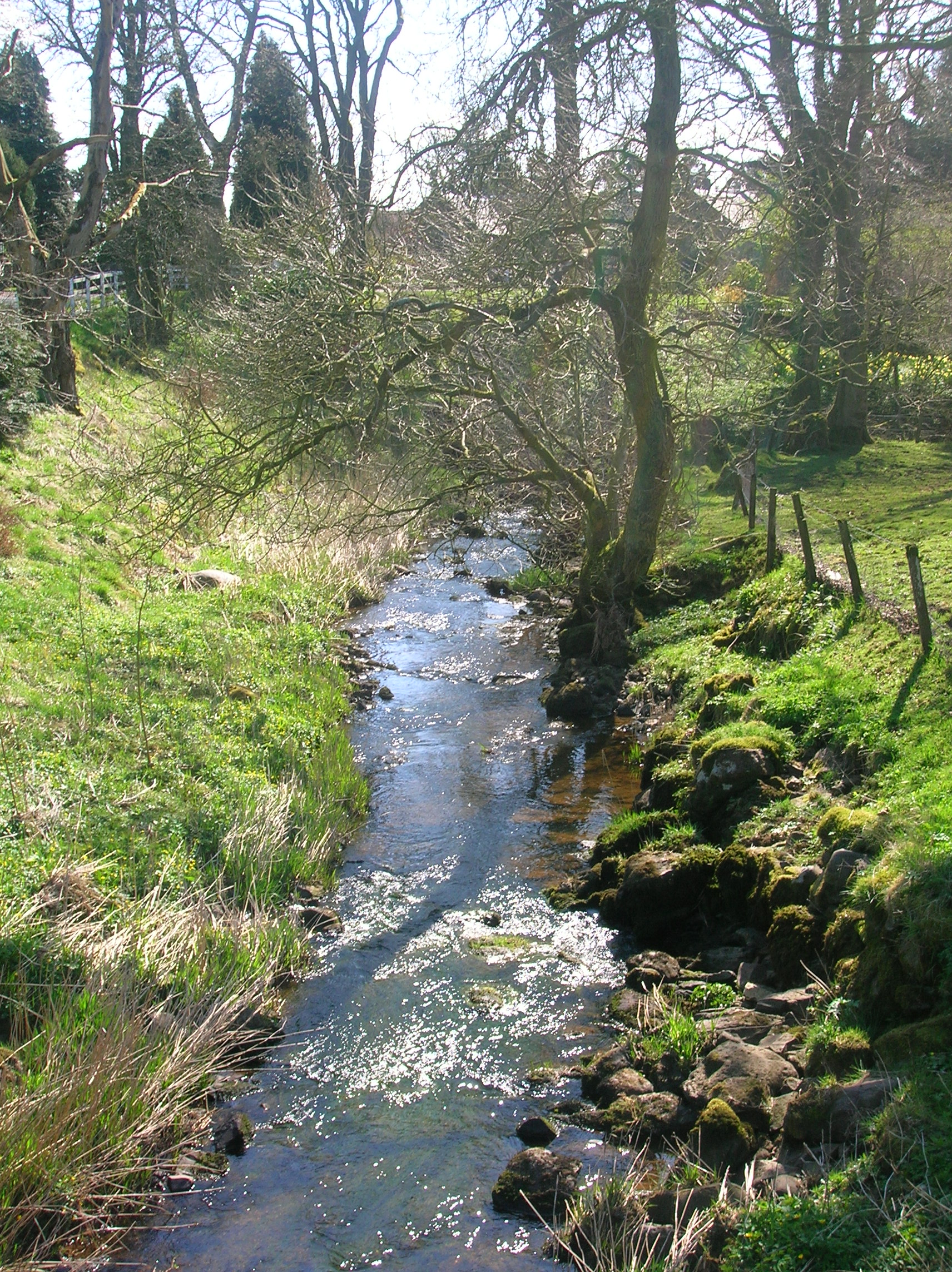
The Clerkland Burn at Clerkland House, looking towards Stewarton, 2007

An Ayrshire cow was given to Robbie Burns in 1788 by Mr. J. Dunlop of Dunlop. He wrote to say that the gift was the finest quey in Ayrshire. A 'quey' was the Scots for a heifer until she had birthed a calf.

In Sir Walter Scott's "Heart Of Midlothian" he has the Duke of Argyll saying "the Dunlop is the very cheese of which I am so fond, and I will take it as the greatest favour you can do me to send one to Caroline Park. But remember, be on honour with it, Jeanie, and make it all yourself, for I am a real good judge."

Timothy Pont states of Stewarton and Dunlop in 1604 – 1608 that "the butter of this countrey in effecte serves a grate pairt of ye Kingdome, one aker of ground heir yielding more butter then 3 akers of ground in aney adiacent countreys".

One place that Dunlop cheese is made today (2008) is at West Clerkland Farm, a short distance from Barbara Gilmour's old home.

=== The Dunlop legacy of Barbara Gilmour ===
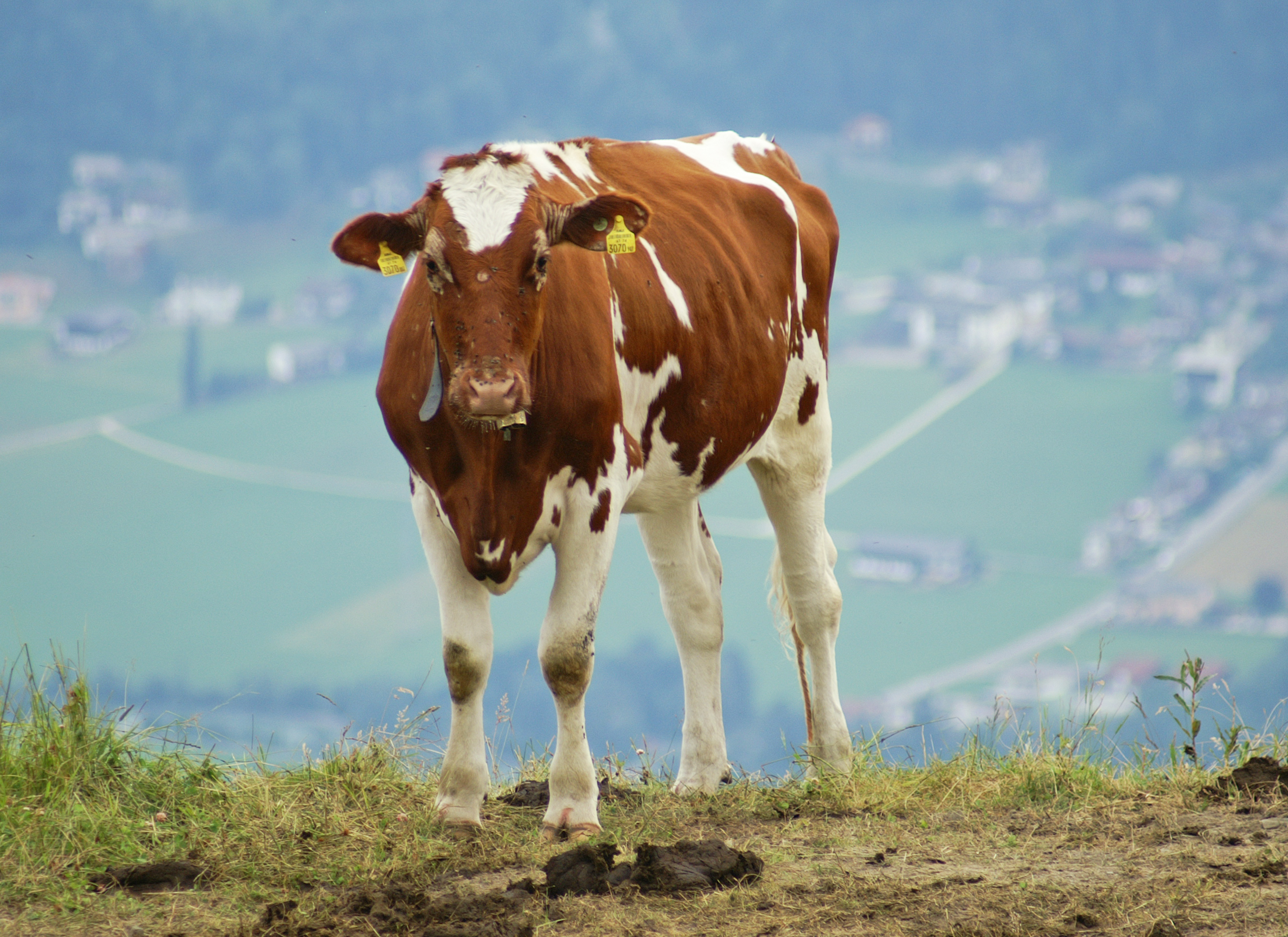
An Ayrshire

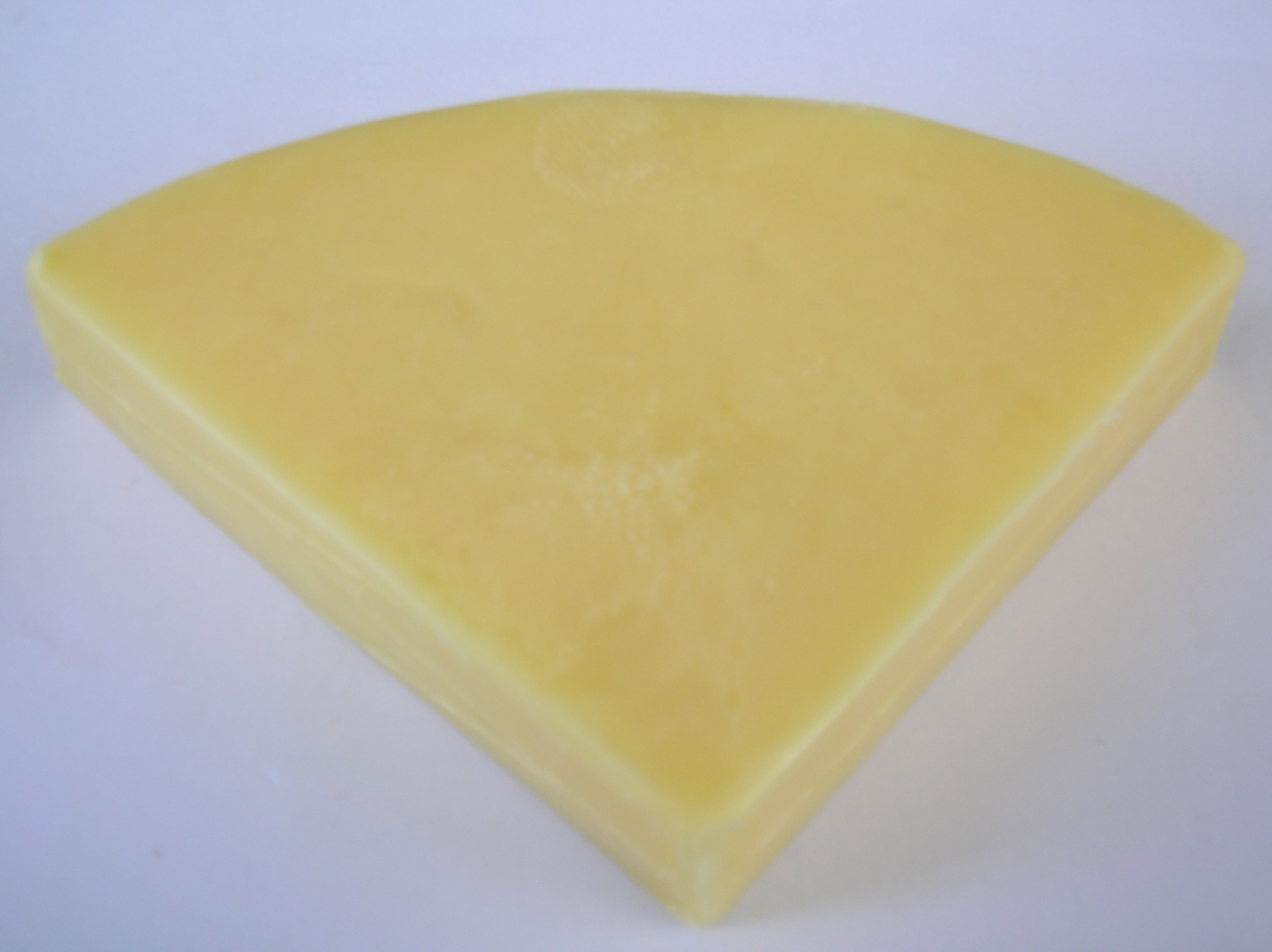
Dunlop cheese from Clerkland Farm.

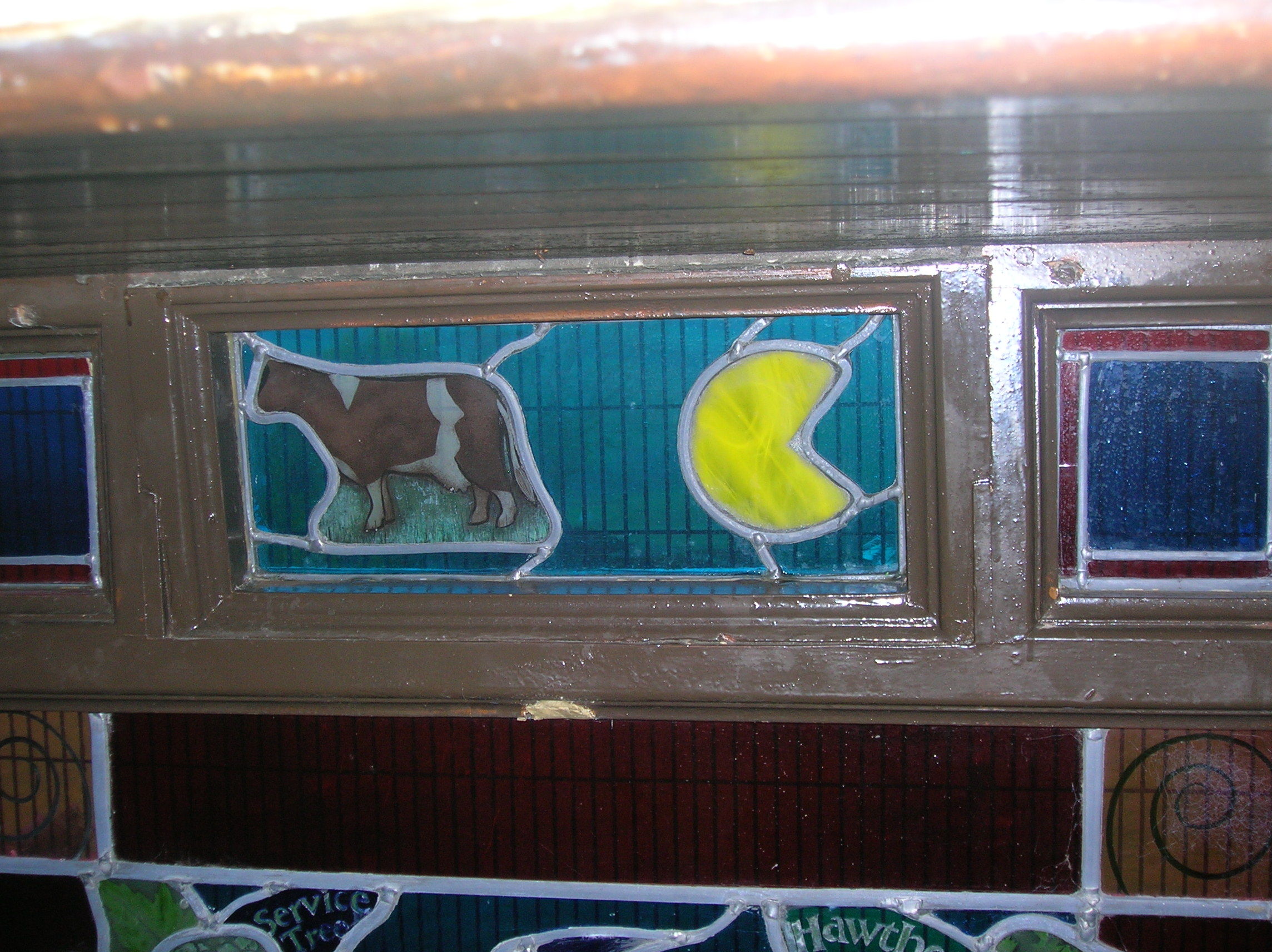
A detail from the millennium window in Dunlop Kirk showing Dunlop cheese and an Ayrshire cow

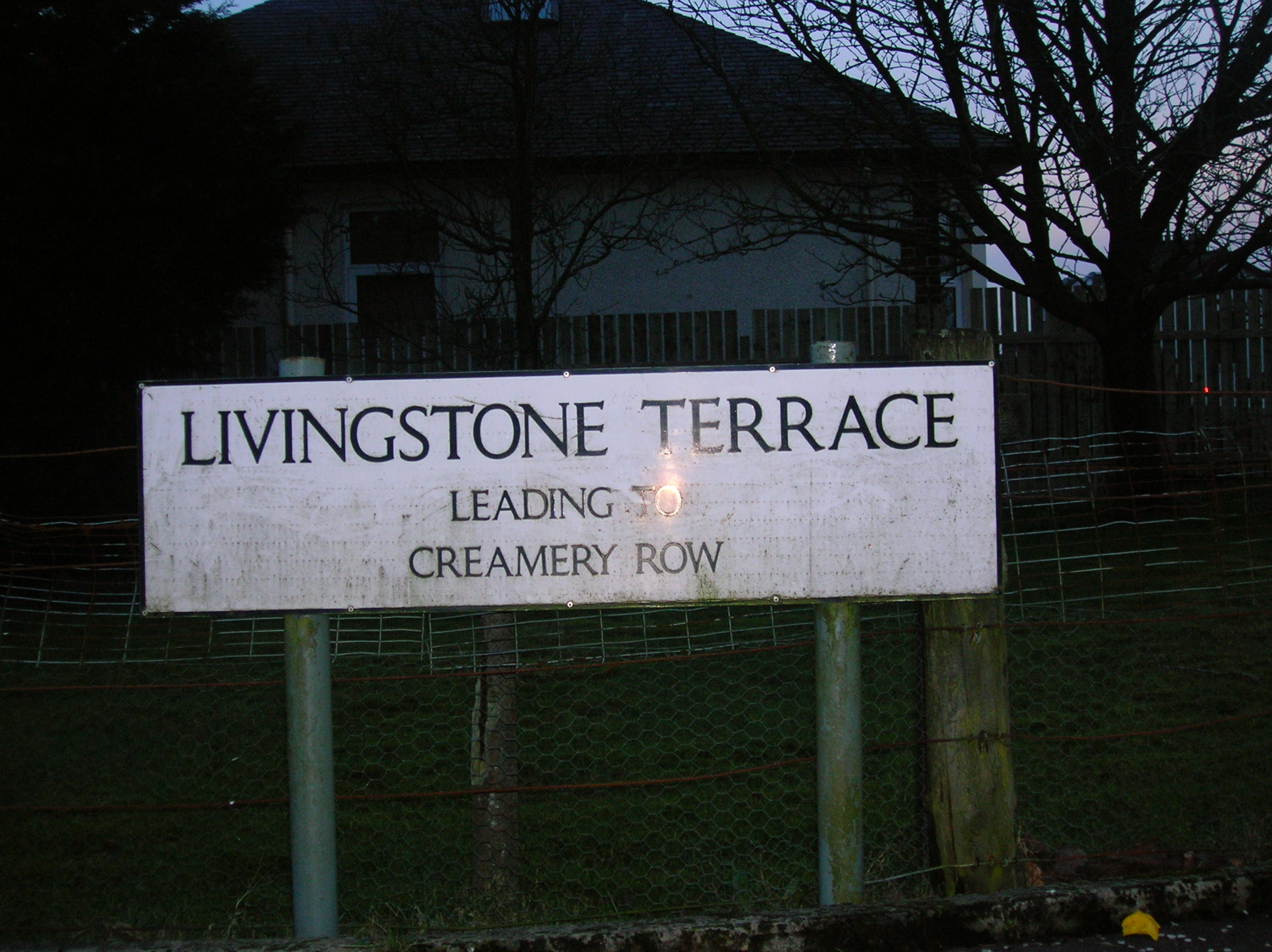
Creamery Row in Dunlop. The creamery opened in 1893 and closed in 1933.

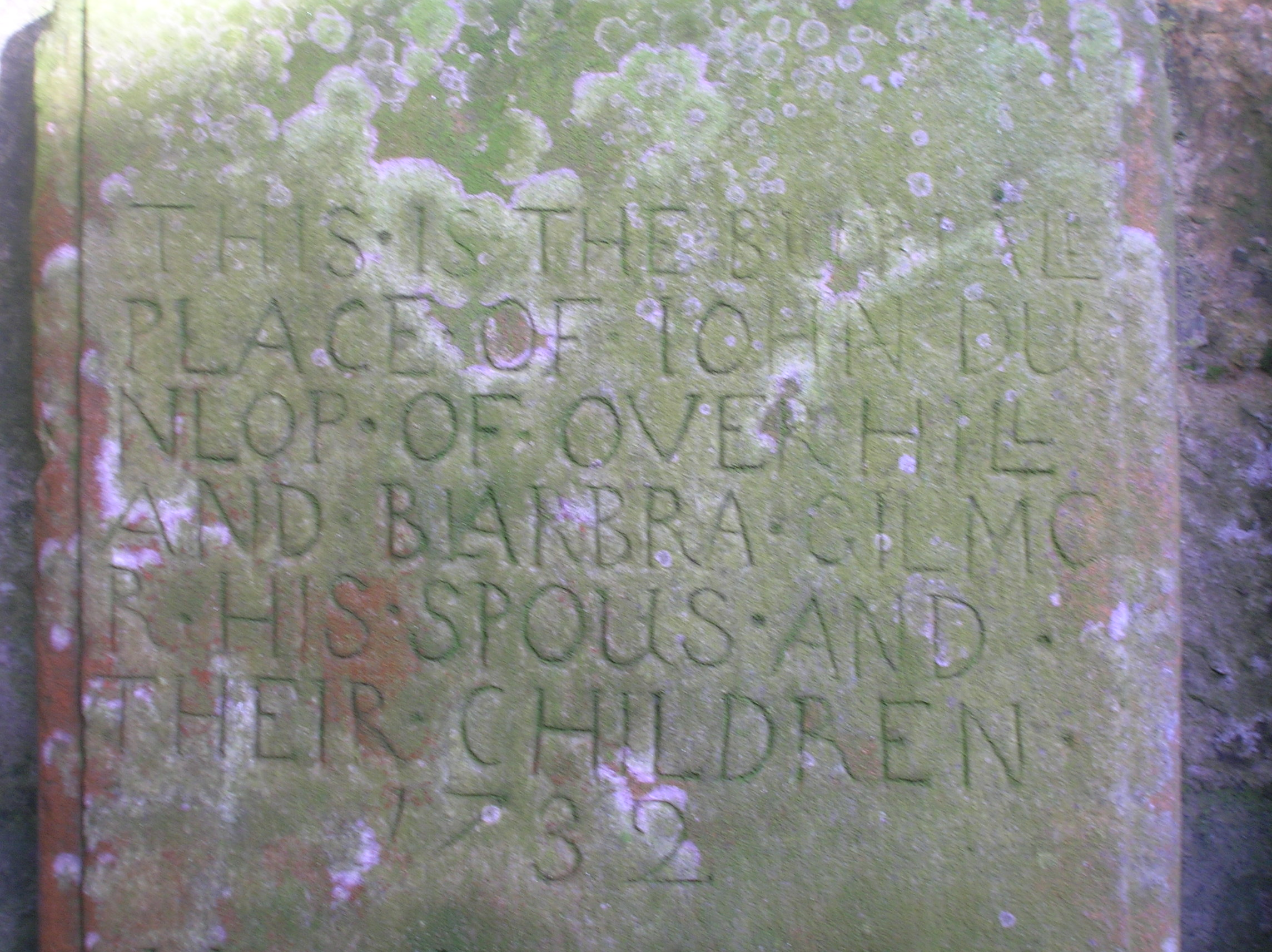
A close up view Barbra Gilmor's gravestone in Dunlop Parish kirk graveyard

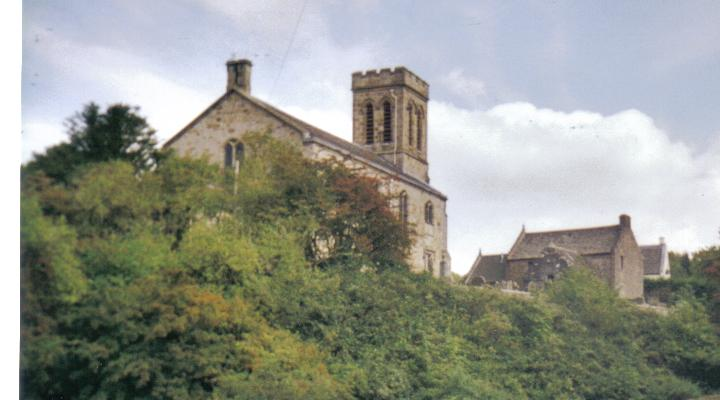
A view of Dunlop kirk, burial place of Barbara Gilmour

== See also ==
- Dalgarven Mill – The Ayrshire Museum of Country Life & Costume
- Corsehill – A history of the area
- Dunlop cheese
- Lugton
