= Dunlop cheese =

Scottish cheese

Dunlop
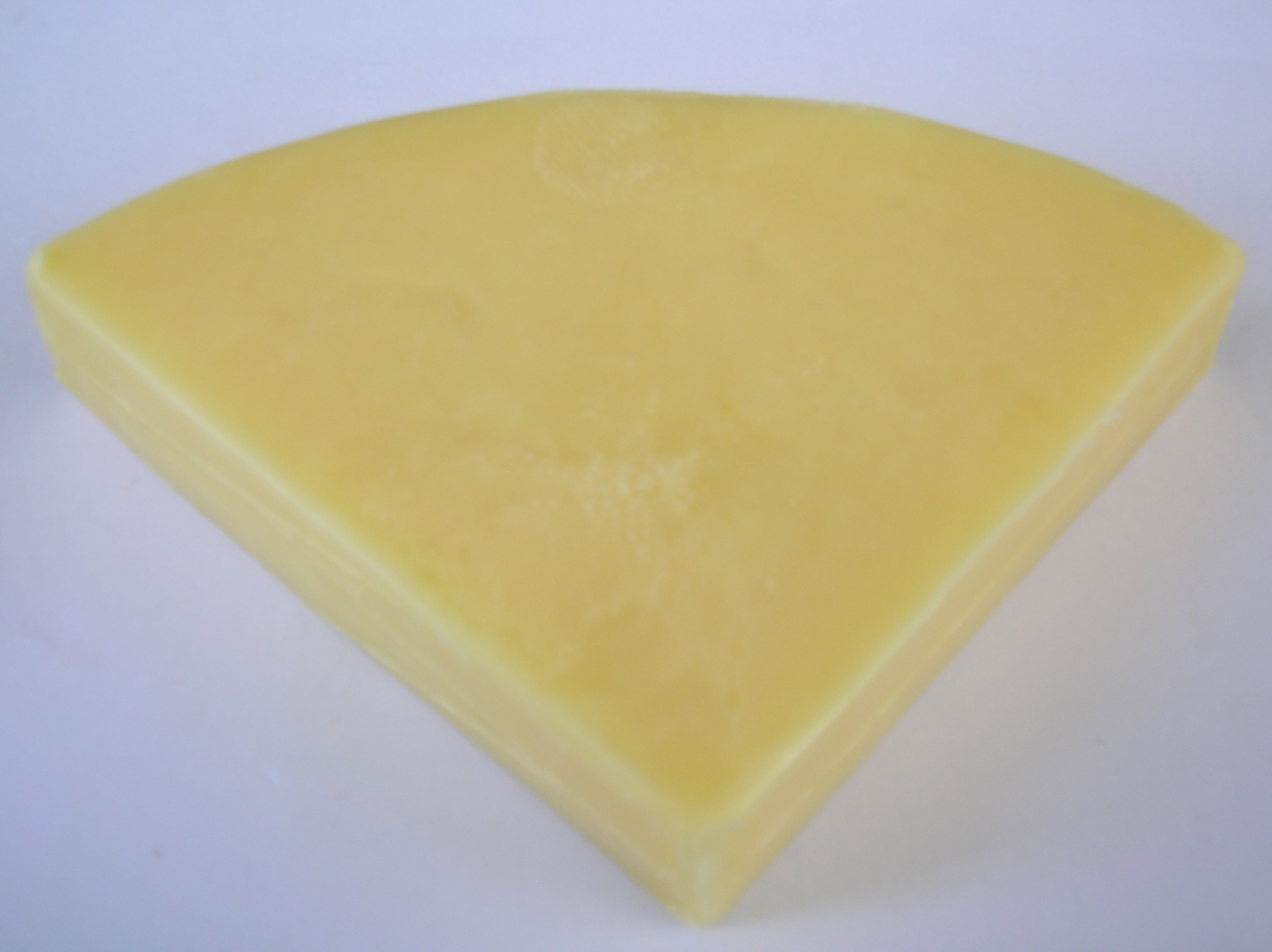
- Country of origin: Scotland
- Region: Ayrshire
- Town: Dunlop
- Source of milk: Cows
- Pasteurised: Yes
- Texture: Hard
- Certification: PGI (as Traditional Ayrshire Dunlop)
- Named after: Dunlop

Dunlop (Scottish Gaelic: càise Dhùn Lùib) is a mild cheese or 'sweet-milk cheese' from Dunlop, East Ayrshire, Scotland. It resembles a soft Cheddar cheese in texture. Though it fell out of popularity some time after the end of the Second World War, it is now appreciated for its value in various recipes and for eating on its own or with a dram of whisky.

A strong link exists with Robert Burns as related by his family's friend Jessie Lewars who related that "When he chanced to come home and find no dinner ready, he was never in the least irritated, but would address himself with the greatest cheerfulness to any makeshift set before him. They generally had abundance of good Dunlop cheese, sent them by their Ayrshire friends. The poet would sit down to bread and cheese, with his book by his side and seem to the casual visitor as happy as a courtier at the feast of Kings."

A traditional creation method has been registered as a Protected Geographical Indication since 2015 in the EU and (after Brexit) in the UK under the name Traditional Ayrshire Dunlop.

== Background ==
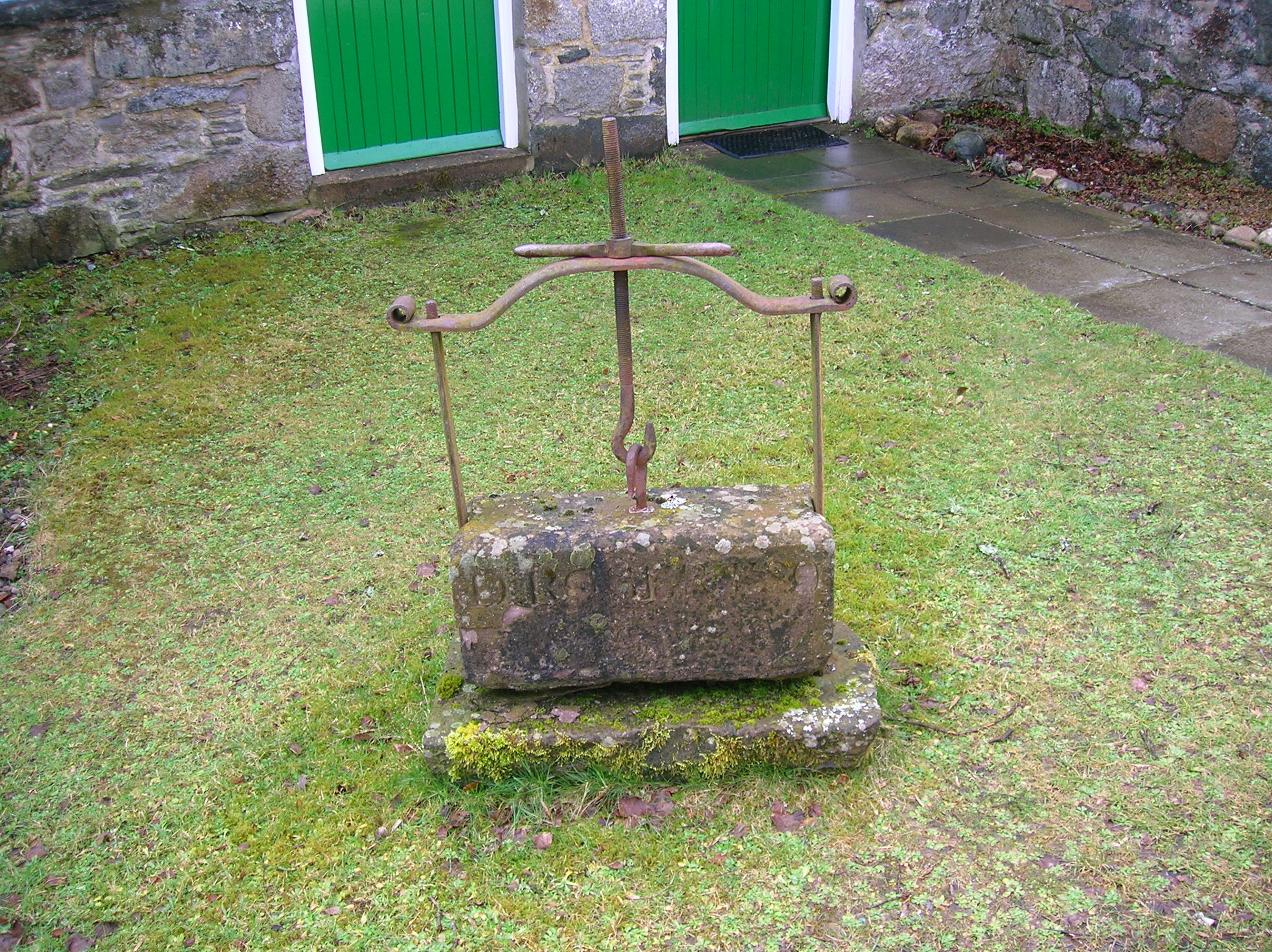
An old cheesepress from Kindrogan House, Strath Ardle

In the early 18th century Barbara Gilmour successfully manufactured a type of cheese till then unknown in Scotland, being made from unskimmed milk from Ayrshire cows. Her process was copied by her neighbours and 'Dunlop cheese' came into such demand, that whether made by Barbara, her neighbours, or by the housewives of adjoining parishes, it found a ready market. It is suggested that the spread of the cheese to other districts was largely through farmers who had settled there from Dunlop parish. Even William Cobbett himself pronounced it 'equal in quality to any cheese from Cheshire, Gloucestershire, or Wiltshire.

Gilmour was something of an evangelist in the matter of making sweet milk (unskimmed milk) cheese, and being a forthright and energetic character she traveled widely to teach the making of her Dunlop cheese, and so stimulated a nationwide demand. This demand stimulated merchants to visit Cunninghame, buy Dunlop cheese and sell it throughout the central lowlands of Scotland. Local cheese merchants from Kirktoun also bought up the cheese and took them to Glasgow for sale in the markets.

The new system for making cheese was widely copied and extended rapidly to many parts of Scotland by the end of the 18th century, even where traditionally sheep's milk cheese had been made. Nothing but skimmed milk having been used in the process of cheese making in this district, previously, all the cheese similarly made in the western counties received the appellation of "Dunlop" and in 1837 the Ayrshire Statistical Account records that 25,000 stones imperial were made in this parish annually.

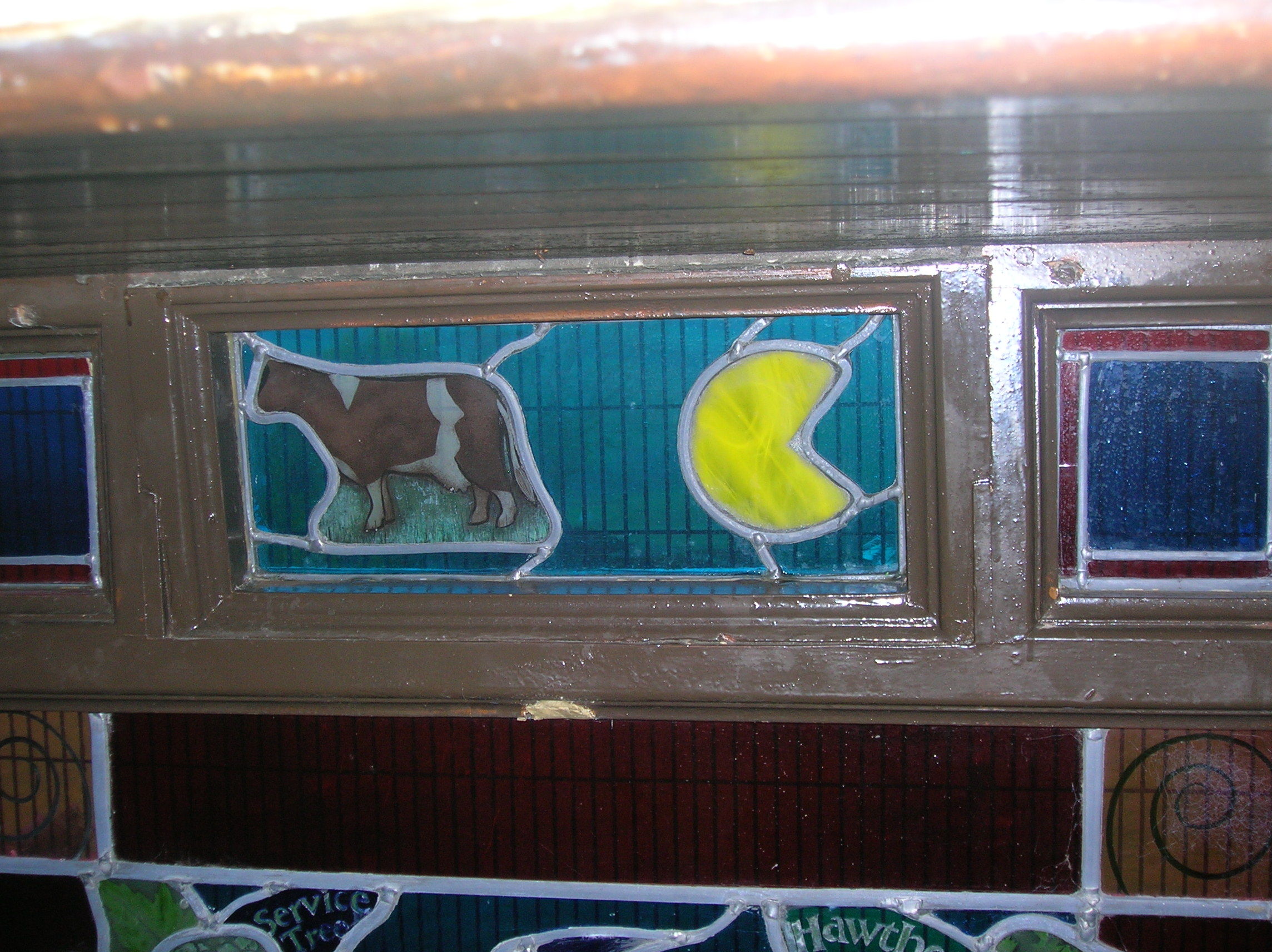
A detail from the millennium window in Dunlop Church showing Dunlop cheese and an Ayrshire cow

The characteristics of Dunlop cheese are that it is a mild, sweet, buttery-tasting cheese with a semi-soft texture when young but maturing to a fudgey or hard texture after a few months. Dunlop cheese is soft and tasteless when turned out of the chesset or mould. It requires from six to twelve months to mature, and to acquire the light, elegant, charming flavour and fragrance peculiar to the Dunlop, it must be kept in a thoroughly dry place and be frequently turned upside-down, as it undergoes a slight fermentation which heaves it a little on the top. One drawback of Dunlop cheese is that its nearest direct competitor, New Cheddar cheese, being dry and hard, retains its weight while kept in stock, and it is also in the condition at an earlier date to be exhibited in cuts.

Salt from the saltpans at Saltcoats was often used in the manufacture of Dunlop cheese. The salt contained magnesia and Epsom Salts (magnesium sulphate) which gave the cheese a pleasant and distinctive taste; indeed it was debated whether cheese made using cheaper imported mined salt could be called 'Dunlop' cheese.

Historically, poor transport had encouraged the making of butter and cheese from fresh milk due to its highly perishable nature; when the railways came in the 19th century, however, farmers were able to transport and sell their milk further afield, and much less was available for making cheese. Paterson records in 1866 that Dunlop cheese has to some extent been superseded by the Cheddar system of cheese-making.

The high value which was set on the Barbara Gilmour cheese for the purpose of roasting was very much confined to Ayrshire, where a farl of oat cake or supple scone spread with roasted cheese, and a bowl of milk, or whey, or tea, or cold water, made a highly relished and substantial meal, precluding in many families the use of bacon for breakfast. With the vast population of England cheese was only eaten 'raw' with loaf bread, usually spread with mustard, and accompanied with the inevitable pot of beer. For this purpose the dry Cheddar and dry and salt American cheese were the favourites. The very dryness and saltness heighten thirst, and therefore the relish of the beer.

== Current production ==
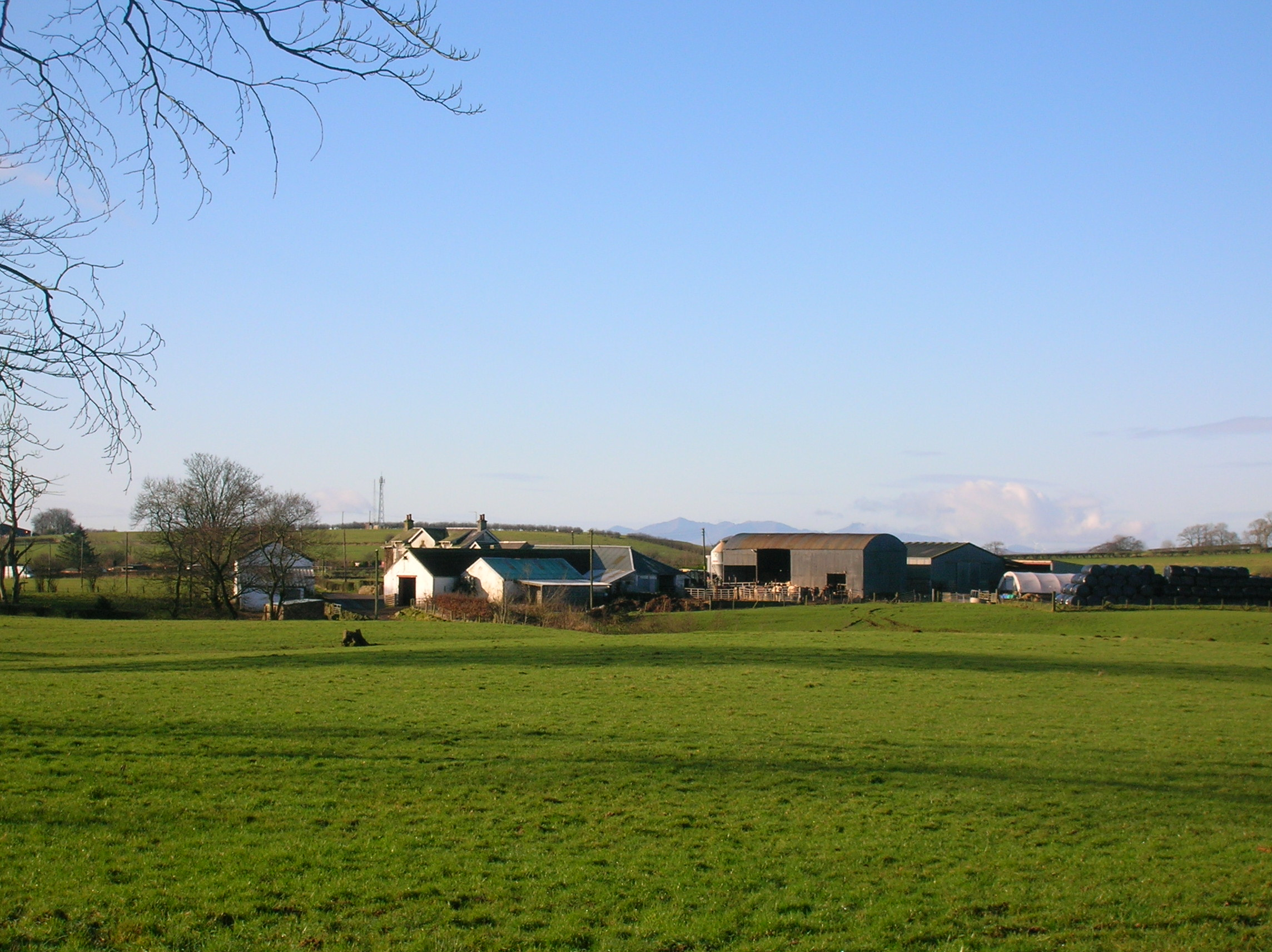
A view of Clerkland Farm in East Ayrshire where Dunlop Cheese is still made (as of 2007)

The local production of Dunlop cheese ceased in around 1940, and has only been sporadic since the Second World War, however Dunlop and other cheeses are as of 2007 made at West Clerkland Farm just outside Stewarton on the Dunlop Road, and are also produced on Islay and elsewhere.

The Dunlop Cheese factory was sited near Dunlop railway station in what is now a housing estate, the memory of Dunlop cheese production being kept alive by the name 'Creamery Row'.

== See also ==
- Dalgarven Mill – The Ayrshire Museum of Country Life & Costume
- Corsehill – A history of the area
- List of British cheeses
- Lugton
- Scottish cuisine

== Bibliography ==
- Boyle, Andrew (1990), Dunlop Cheese and Ayrshire Bacon. Ayrshire Heritage. Pub. Alloway Pub. Co., ISBN 0-907526-49-7.
