= Lands of Borland =

Coordinates: 55.710794°N 4.550070°W

Lands of Borland: Scots: Boarland
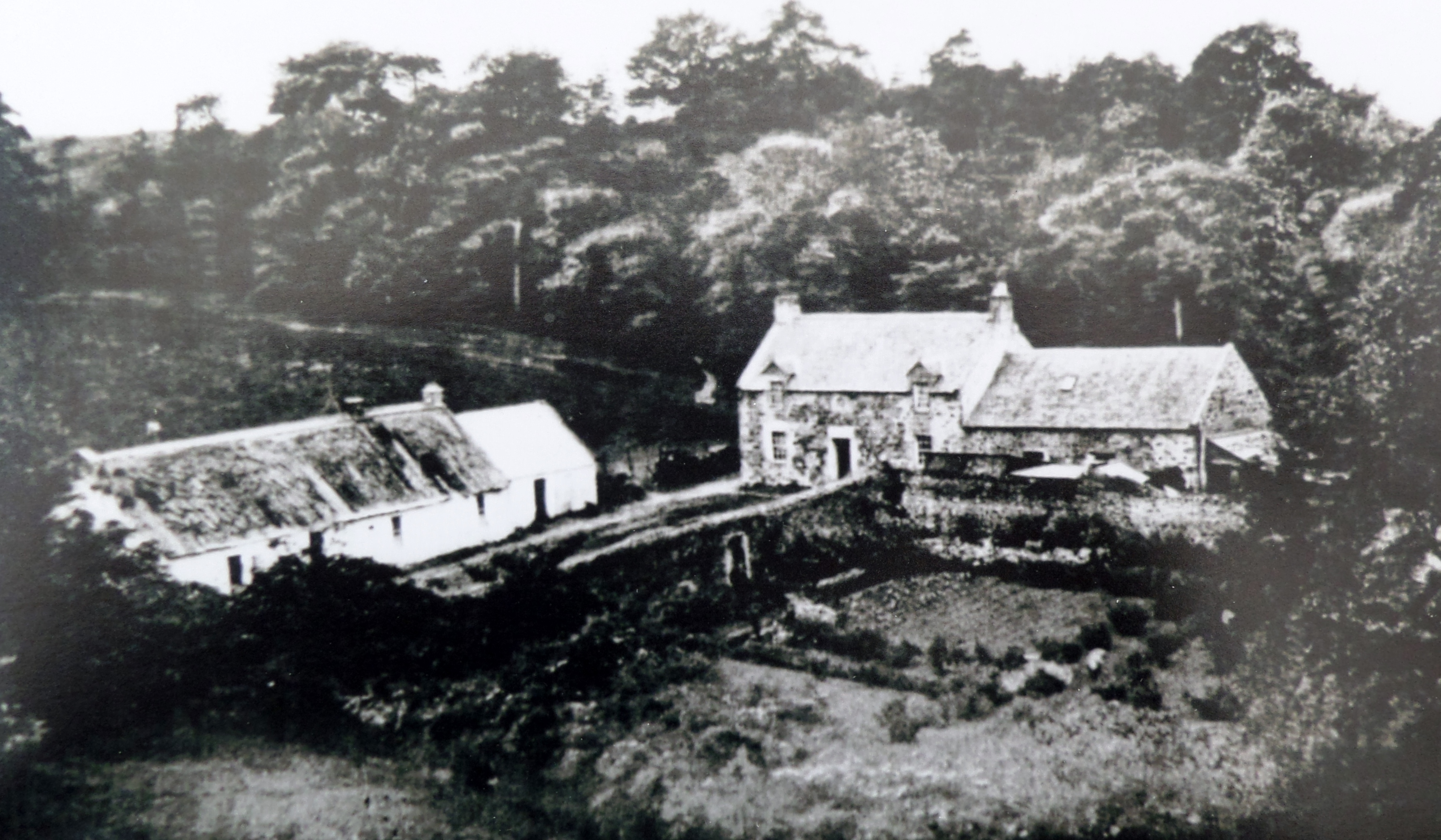
- Borland circa 1900

- Location within East Ayrshire
- OS grid reference: NS398493
- Council area: East Ayrshire
- Lieutenancy area: Ayrshire
- Country: Scotland
- Sovereign state: United Kingdom
- Post town: Kilmarnock
- Police: Scotland
- Fire: Scottish
- Ambulance: Scottish

The Lands of Borland formed an estate lying between Aiket Castle and the town of Dunlop, in the Parish of Dunlop, East Ayrshire, Scotland. The laird's house at Borland was located near the Sandy Ford across the Glazert Water. Various names have been applied to the site of the laird's house, including Bordland, Boreland, Borland, Laigh Borland, Low Borland, and Nether Borland.

== History ==
=== The mansion house, castle, farm and estate ===
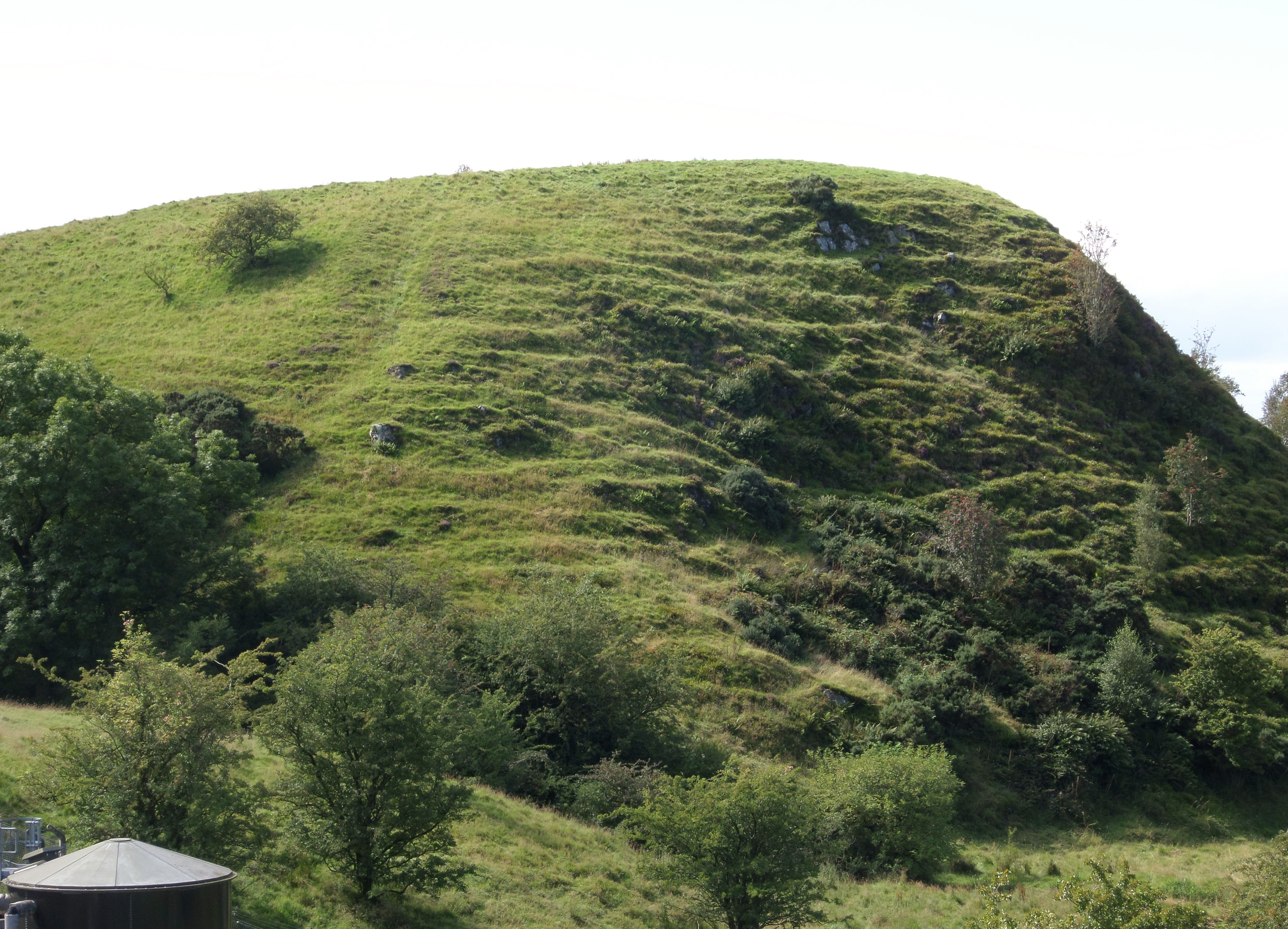
A view of Dunlop or Borland Hill showing the 'Cuckoo Slide'. The summit was the site of the castle built by Godfrey de Ross.

In 1848, the Scottish Journal recorded that the foundations of a ruin of considerable extent had been removed some years earlier by the then proprietor. In 1853, Mr Dobie noted that the meiths (boundary lines) of a substantial building were still traceable at the summit of Borland Hill. In 1856, Mr G. Howie of Dunlop stated that he remembered seeing a small portion of what was said to be one of the walls around 70 or 80 years prior. It appeared as a sort of bank, entirely crumbled and overgrown with grass. Since that time, the remains of a sizeable building were removed and the area cultivated. On the southern side of the hill, the remains of a wide ditch or fosse are visible, locally known as the "Cuckoo Slide". Paterson, in 1866, similarly reported that the foundations of a ruin had been removed by a former proprietor.

According to local tradition, the monks of Kilwinning Abbey maintained a hospice for their brethren at Borland, where medicinal herbs were cultivated in a formal garden. It is recorded that a two merk land at Dunlop was allocated to the church, with the remainder used by the monks. Borland may have functioned in a manner similar to Monkredding, near Kilwinning, which was also held by the Tironensian monks and known as the "Monk's Garden"—essentially a rest home for the brothers.

==== Borland ====
A substantial and ornately carved table-style gravestone in Dunlop churchyard commemorates William Anderson, who died aged 70 on 3 December 179[?]6, and his wife, who died in 1784. The memorial was erected by their son, Robert Anderson of Borland. The stone now rests against the "Picture House" building.

The 1797–98 Farm Horse Tax records list John Dunlop’s horses at Laigh Borland.

Around 1823, Andrew and Mary Brown inherited "the original mansion, lately rebuilt, on the banks of the Glazert, in a remarkably pleasant situation." Mary Dunlop married Andrew Brown of Craighead, the eldest son of John Brown of Hill. As part of her inheritance, she received the portion of Borland containing the old mansion house, "romantically situated by the Glazert Water." One of their first acts as proprietors was to rebuild the mansion house. Although sources disagree on the precise date of reconstruction, the early 19th century appears likely. The walled garden was probably built in the same period, possibly incorporating stones from the earlier castle.

Borland—later referred to as Nether or Laigh Borland—was described in the Ordnance Survey Name Book (1855–57) as comprising:

Two small farm houses & steadings with gardens etc. attached, in a sheltered situation on the side of Glazert Burn about ½ mile south-west of Dunlop, the property of Andrew Brown Esq. of Hill and occupied by Mr. James Templeton and Mr. Robert Frew.

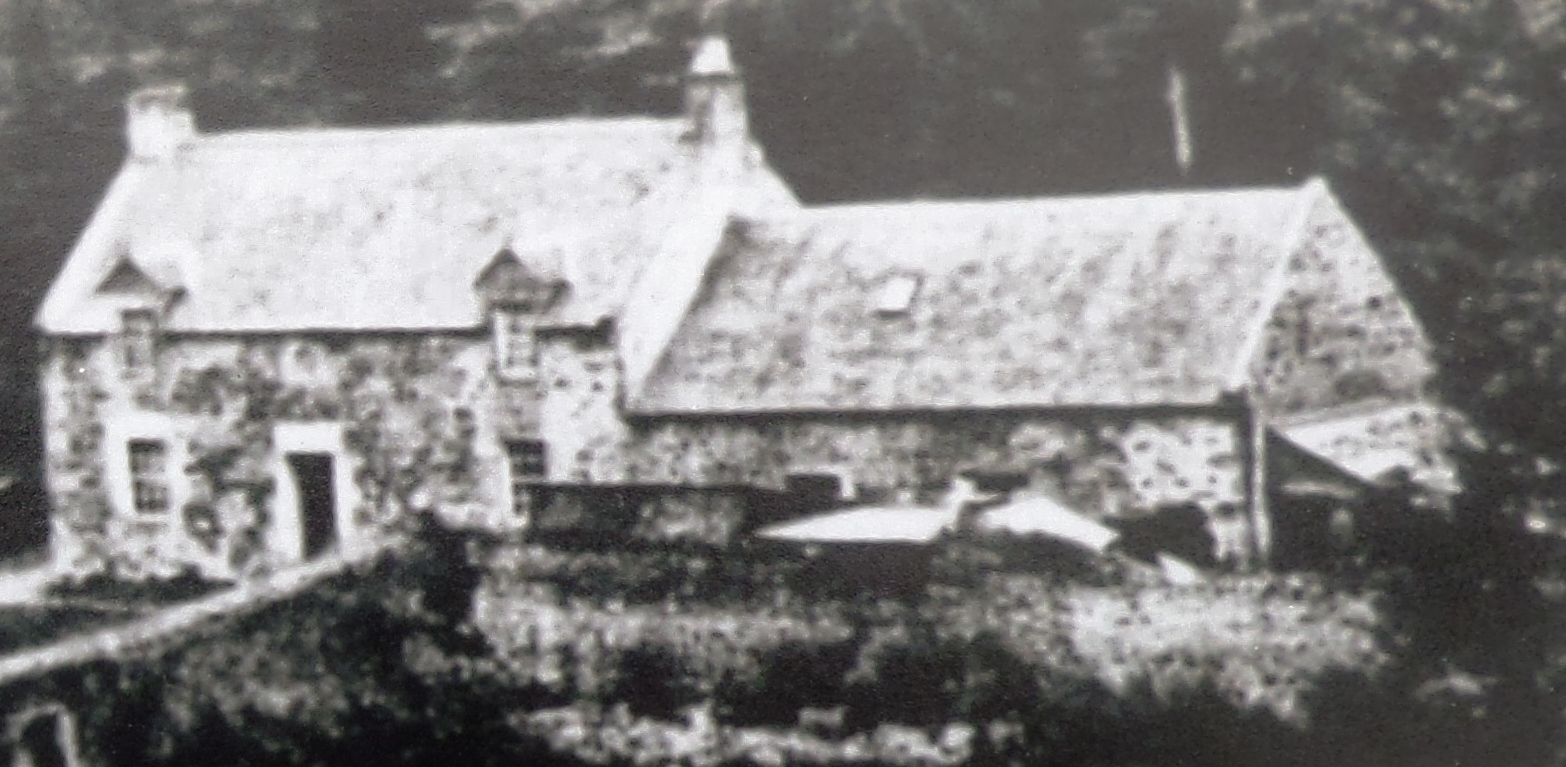
Borland House prior to 1916

Walled gardens are uncommon at ordinary farms; their presence at Borland suggests the site once held a higher status. The garden is square in layout and likely dates to the 18th century. Its south, east and west walls were rebuilt around 1916, though at a reduced height and length. Constructed primarily of random rubble with flat sandstone copings, these walls are noticeably thinner than the unaltered north wall. Cylindrical gate piers with conical caps were also added in 1916, slightly set back from the wall line. A former doorway on the east side has been sealed. A culvert or cundy runs beneath the garden and continues as a stream on the north side, eventually draining into the Glazert Water. An old black-and-white photograph shows a sundial once stood in the centre of the garden.

Laigh Borland was demolished in the mid-20th century. A 16th- or 17th-century datestone bearing the initials of the Brown family once stood above the entrance to an attached building, formerly used as a kitchen. Accessibility to the site had been improved via a hardcore road from Over Borland, as the original ford limited access. However, the local council deemed the building unsafe for children playing nearby and required its demolition. The proprietors, who had held the site since 1912, were forced to comply.

Cottages formerly occupied by workers, including one by Mrs Watt, were thatched until demolition. A small ruined building, likely a pigsty, still partially exists, built into the hillside. The Watt family grave notes that Martha Watt (née Stevenson) died in 1916 at Laigh Borland, aged 81. The cottages were demolished shortly thereafter, coinciding with alterations to the walled garden.

==== Over Borland ====
Robert Wilson of Over Borland was married to Agnes Gemmill, who died in November 1636. Her will includes bequests to her grandsons, John Dunlop and William Gemmill.

John Dunlop of Over Borland married Elizabeth Walkinshaw. In 1650, his estate was valued at 100 Scots pounds.

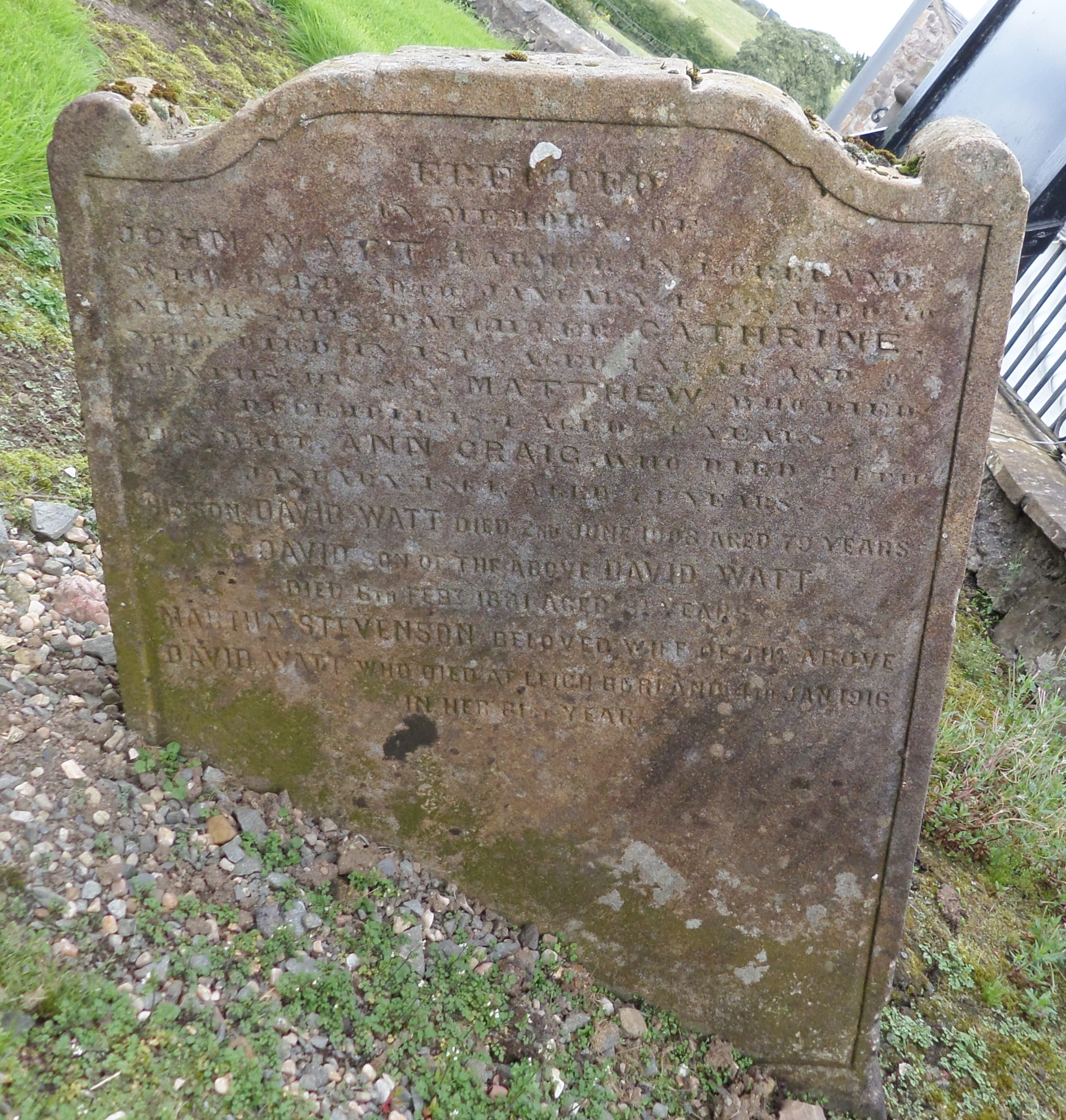
Gravestone of the Watts of Borland and Laigh Borland

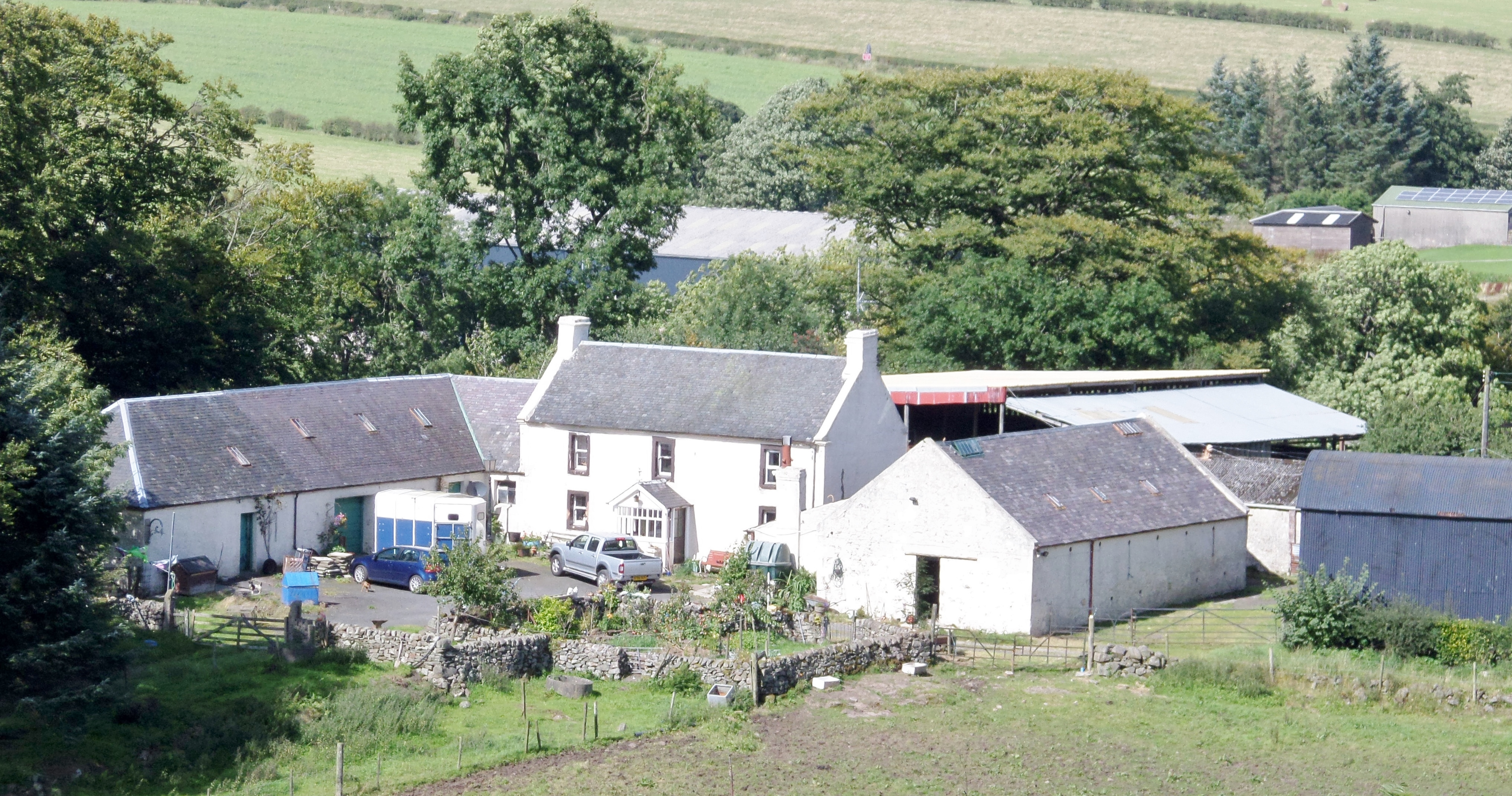
Over Borland Farm

A gravestone in Dunlop churchyard commemorates John Dunlop of Over Borland, his wife Jean Gilmour, and their children: John (died aged 4, 1778), Margaret (5 months, 1784), William (aged 3, 1792), another John (aged 12, 1792), and Jane (aged 27, 1804). Jean Gilmour died in 1827.

Over Borland is a Category C listed farmhouse located at the end of a lane. The building bears a 1770 datestone inscribed "RN JS 1770" and another stone by the doorway marked "JMN MRS 1912". The latter refers to the same family who continue to reside there.

During 1855–1857, Over Borland was recorded as the property of Andrew Brown Esq., occupied by Mrs Watt. Along with 'Hill' (also known as Over Hill), it is one of the oldest surviving two-storey farmhouses in the Parish of Dunlop.

The removal of the old castle masonry is estimated to have occurred around 1781 ± 5 years, aligning with the 1770 date on the Over Borland datestone. It has been suggested that Over Borland was enlarged as a replacement residence for Laigh Borland, which was subsequently let to tenants.

A family gravestone in Dunlop churchyard records John Watt, farmer at Boreland, and his wife Ann Craig. Their children Catherine and Matthew died young, while their son David lived to age 79, dying in 1881. David's wife, Martha Stevenson, died at Laigh Borland in 1916.

==== North Borland ====
Jane Dunlop married Thomas Reid of Balgray, near Irvine. Their son, John Dunlop Reid, inherited the North Borland portion of the Borland lands. Thomas and Jane Reid constructed a new house at North Borland.

==== Other Borland properties ====
The Hill, or Over-Hill, of Dunlop was once part of the Lands of Borland and passed to the Brown family through marriage. A burial stone in Dunlop churchyard commemorates John Dunlop of Overhill and his wife, Barbara Gilmour, dated 1732. Their grandson, Andrew Brown, is also mentioned, with a date of 1794.

John Dunlop and Barbara Gilmour had one daughter, Mary, who married Allan Brown of Gabroch-hill. After several generations and intermarriages, Andrew Brown of Craighead married Mary Dunlop of Borland, and the couple eventually inherited Hill or Overhill.

Borlandhills and several other properties were historically part of the Lands of Borland.

=== The lairds ===
Although displaced from Borland Hill [sic], the native chiefs do not appear to have been exiled. Instead, they established themselves as the Dunlops of that Ilk at what is now Dunlop House, situated on the Clerkland Burn.

According to tradition, the De Ross family first held Borland, or Dunlop Hill (NS 4019 4940), as their seat. A well-fortified, stone-built structure is said to have existed at the site, which was later abandoned in favour of Corsehill near Stewarton. The etymology of the placename suggests that a Celtic hillfort may once have stood there. Corsehill Castle became the family's principal residence after Godfrey de Ross was granted the Lands of Stewarton.

The De Ross family were vassals to the De Morvilles, the overlords of Cunninghame. The De Morvilles supported John Balliol's claim to the Scottish throne, and consequently forfeited their lands, which passed to the Boyd family. By 1570, the lands were held by the Cassilis family. Timothy Pont recorded that Over and Nether Borland were held by the Kennedys, Earls of Cassilis, in the early 17th century. The lands had passed to them from Godfrey de Ross who, according to Pont, "hauing his refidence heir enioyed ample possefions abrode in ye countrey and ves for ye tyme Shriffe of Aire." Alexander Cunninghame of Aiket later married the sister of the Earl of Cassilis, which may explain how Borland passed into the hands of the Cunninghames of Aiket.

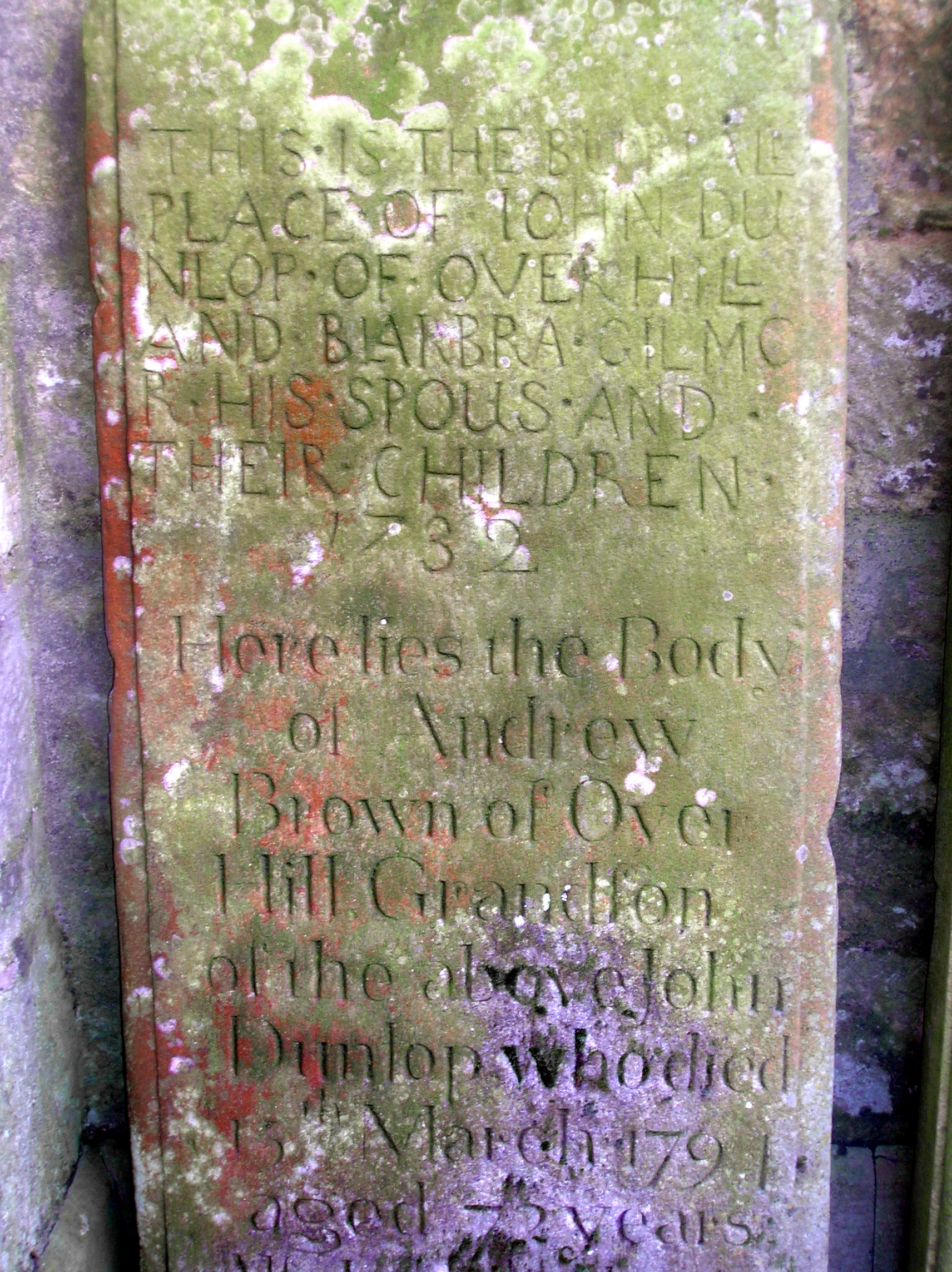
The gravestone of John Dunlop of Over Hill, Barbara Gilmour his wife and Andrew Brown of Over Hill

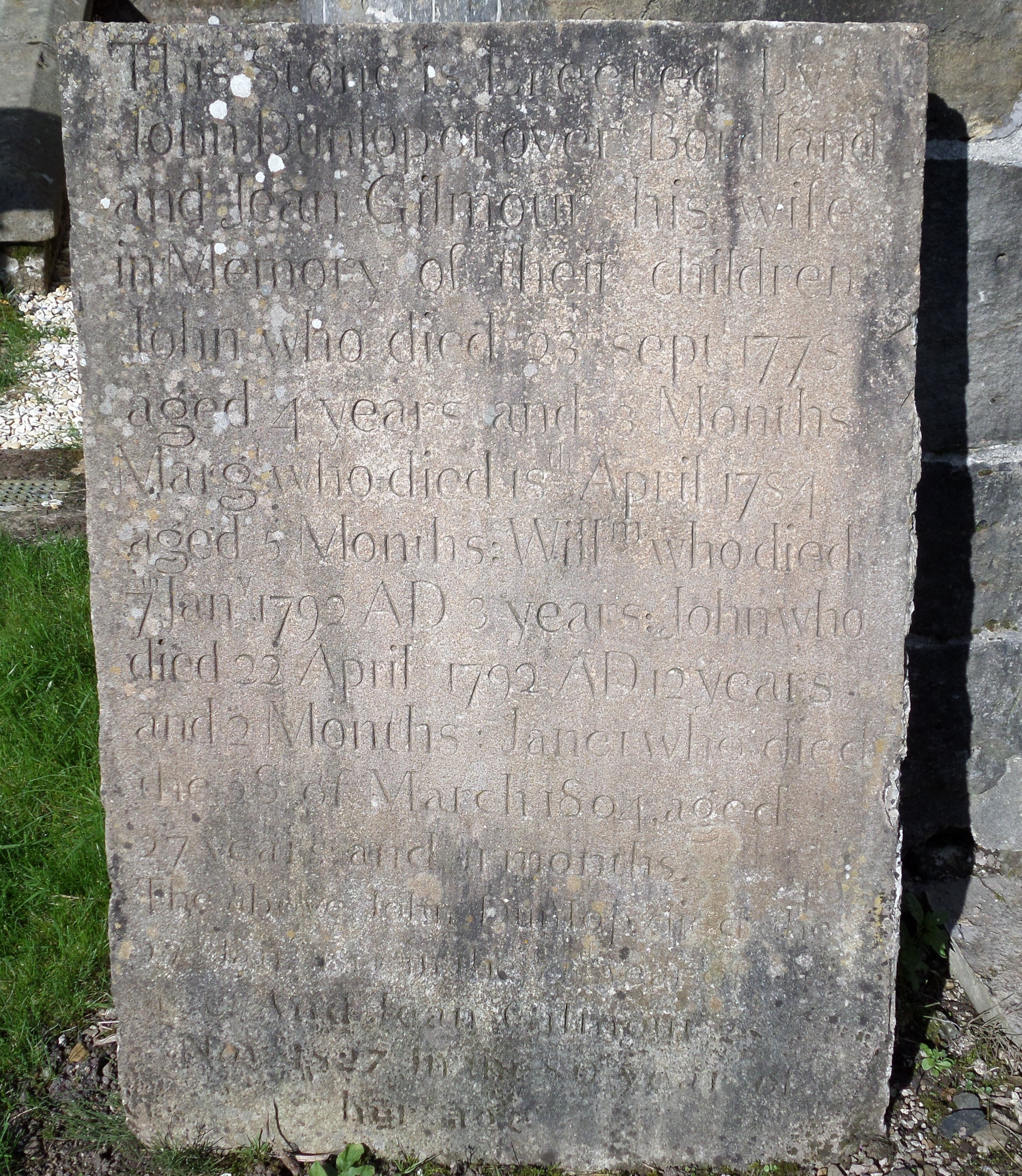
Memorial to John Dunlop, Jean Gilmour and their family

The popular belief that the name 'Borland' derives from the hunting of boar in the area has been challenged. An alternative interpretation suggests that "Bordlands signifie the desmenes which lords keep in their hands for the maintenance of their board or table." The De Ross family were also vassals of Richard de Morville.

Prior to 1597, the 6 merk land of the nearby estate of Hapland was part of the Lands of Dunlop. David Dunlop, fourth of Hapland, exchanged or excambied Hapland for the Lands of Borland, with the year 1600 given by Robertson as the date of the transfer. Although a merk land was a measure of rental value, it is estimated that 6 merks would equate to between 6 and 12 acres. Another source suggests 1660 as the date when Patrick Cuninghame exchanged the lands of Borland for those of Hapland.

John Dunlop, fourth of Borland, married a Montgomerie of High Cross near Stewarton. They had three children, one of whom died young. The eldest son, John, inherited the estate, while another son was known as James of Loanhead. John Dunlop, fifth of Borland, married Mary Clark of Shitterflat [sic], daughter of William Clerk, portioner of that property, and his wife Margaret Simpson. The couple had four sons and two daughters, with the eldest son, John, inheriting the estate.

The Dunlops of Borland continued to hold the estate until the male line ended sometime around 1823. John Dunlop, sixth of Borland, and his wife Jean, daughter of John Gilmour of Tailend (in the eastern part of Dunlop parish), had a large family, though only two daughters, Mary and Jane, survived into adulthood.

Mary Dunlop married Andrew Brown of Craighead, eldest son of John Brown of Hill. She inherited the portion of Borland containing the old mansion house, described as being "romantically situated by the Glazert Water". One of their first actions was to rebuild the mansion. The couple had two sons and six daughters. Their eldest son, John Brown, inherited Borland and was known as "John Brown of Hill, Craighead and Borland". He married Marion Duncan of Brockwellmuir, with whom he had three sons and two daughters. Their eldest son was also named John Brown.

Jane Dunlop, as noted, married Thomas Reid of Balgray near Irvine and inherited the North Borland portion of the Lands of Borland. Their son, John Dunlop Reid, subsequently inherited North Borland.

Thomas and Jane Reid constructed a new house at North Borland, while Andrew and Mary Brown inherited "the original mansion, lately rebuilt, on the banks of the Glazert, in a remarkably pleasant situation."

The Lands of Borland appear to have been held for many years by individuals who might be best described as 'bonnet lairds'—a term used for petty landowners who, like the labourers they employed, wore bonnets. Over Borland seems to have functioned as the main farm, or mains, associated with the laird's house. This is supported by the fact that Borland lacked many of the ancillary buildings associated with a working farm, yet featured a walled garden, a feature more typically associated with mansion houses.

=== The 1586 murder of the 4th Earl of Eglinton ===
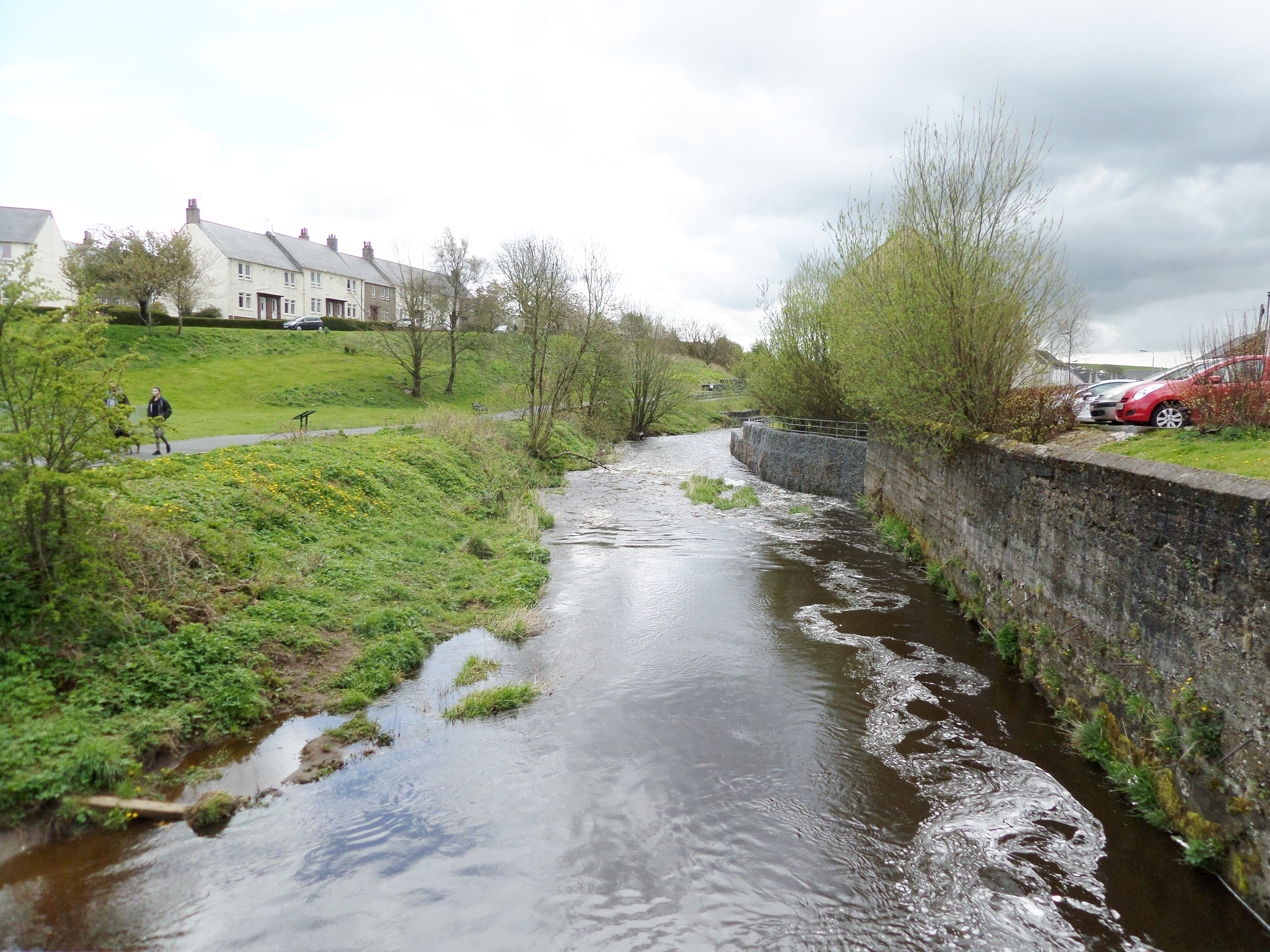
Site of the murder of Hugh, 4th Earl of Eglinton

On 4 November 1570, William and Alexander Cunninghame of Aiket were brought to trial for allegedly ambushing and, together with others, killing John Mure of Caldwell on the Lands of Borland. However, both were acquitted.

According to an old tradition, shortly after the murder of John Mure, the young Laird of Hapland from the Dunlop family was persuaded—against the wishes of his mother—to join the Cunninghames of Aiket in a raid on a neighbouring family with whom they were feuding. The laird’s mother had reportedly dreamt of his death. Her vision proved prescient, as he was mortally wounded on the banks of the Annick Water near Stewarton. His horse, exhausted and covered in foam, returned riderless to Hapland, having escaped the field of conflict where its master had died.

This tradition appears to reference the murder of Hugh Montgomerie, 4th Earl of Eglinton, which occurred at the Annick Ford in Stewarton in 1586. The incident was a consequence of the long-standing feud between the Montgomeries, Earls of Eglinton and the Cunninghames, Earls of Glencairn—families that were vying for regional and national influence. The murder had significant repercussions across Ayrshire and beyond.

A Gilbert Dunlop is listed among the conspirators, although he is recorded as a servant of Patrick of Baidland. Paterson notes that a Gilbert Dunlop existed as early as 1498, suggesting that the name was in use within the Dunlop family. Patrick Cunninghame of Borland (spelled 'Bordland' in some records) was certainly present at the ambush.

It is notable that, not long after the incident, Patrick Cunninghame exchanged (excambied) his Lands of Borland for David Dunlop's Lands of Hapland. This transaction may have been influenced by the consequences of the murder and its political fallout. In 1612, Patrick Cunninghame sold the Hapland estate to Gabriel Porterfield, son of Alexander Porterfield of that Ilk.

== Cartographic evidence ==
Ordnance Survey maps indicate that the main entrance to Laigh Borland was via the Sandy Ford Lane, which passed North Borland and crossed the Glazert Water. A secondary access branched from the lane to Over Borland and descended the steep lower slope of Borland Hill, entering near the south-eastern corner of the walled garden. A footpath with a stile also connected Over Borland to Laigh Borland.

In 1856, Laigh Borland was recorded simply as Borland, while Over Borland retained the name it carries today. The walled garden is depicted with internal beds divided into four equal sections by intersecting paths, and it had an entrance from Sandy Ford Lane. A small structure stood at the entrance to the walled garden. A well is marked near the former workers' cottages, with another located at the end of a well-constructed path leading towards the Glazert Water behind Borland House. A lane—or more likely a cart track—extended from Borland and eventually joined the route to Over Borland. The area behind Borland was wooded, featuring a rectangular open space. Sandy Ford is shown with stepping stones and provided the only vehicular access to Borland House at the time.

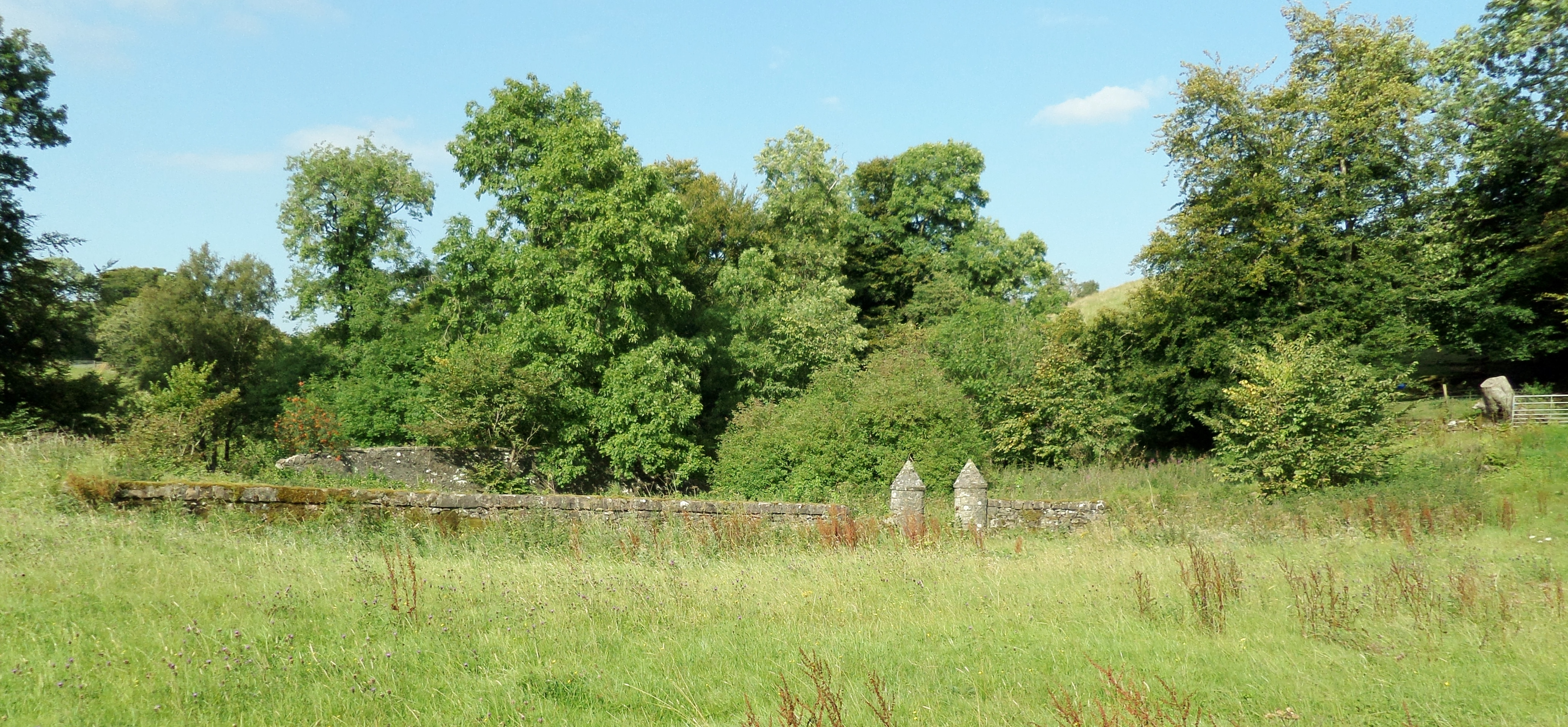
The 1916 walled garden

By 1895, a small pond had appeared behind the north wall of the walled garden, which no longer displayed a formally laid-out interior. A footbridge had been constructed at the ford, and a second path connected what was then marked as Laigh Borland with the lane leading out towards Dunlop via the Straitbow Bridge. Two small buildings are shown abutting the south and west walls of the walled garden.

The 1909 Ordnance Survey map shows some alterations: the pond is no longer marked, only a single track leads towards the Dunlop road via Straitbow Bridge, and the farm cottages have fenced or walled enclosures to their rear. A sundial is indicated as standing in the centre of the walled garden.

By 1957, Laigh Borland was no longer named separately on maps. A new access road had been constructed from Over Borland via the Middle Rig field, and the workers' cottages had been demolished—likely to provide hardcore for the new access. These cottages were still present as of 1925.

=== Placenames ===
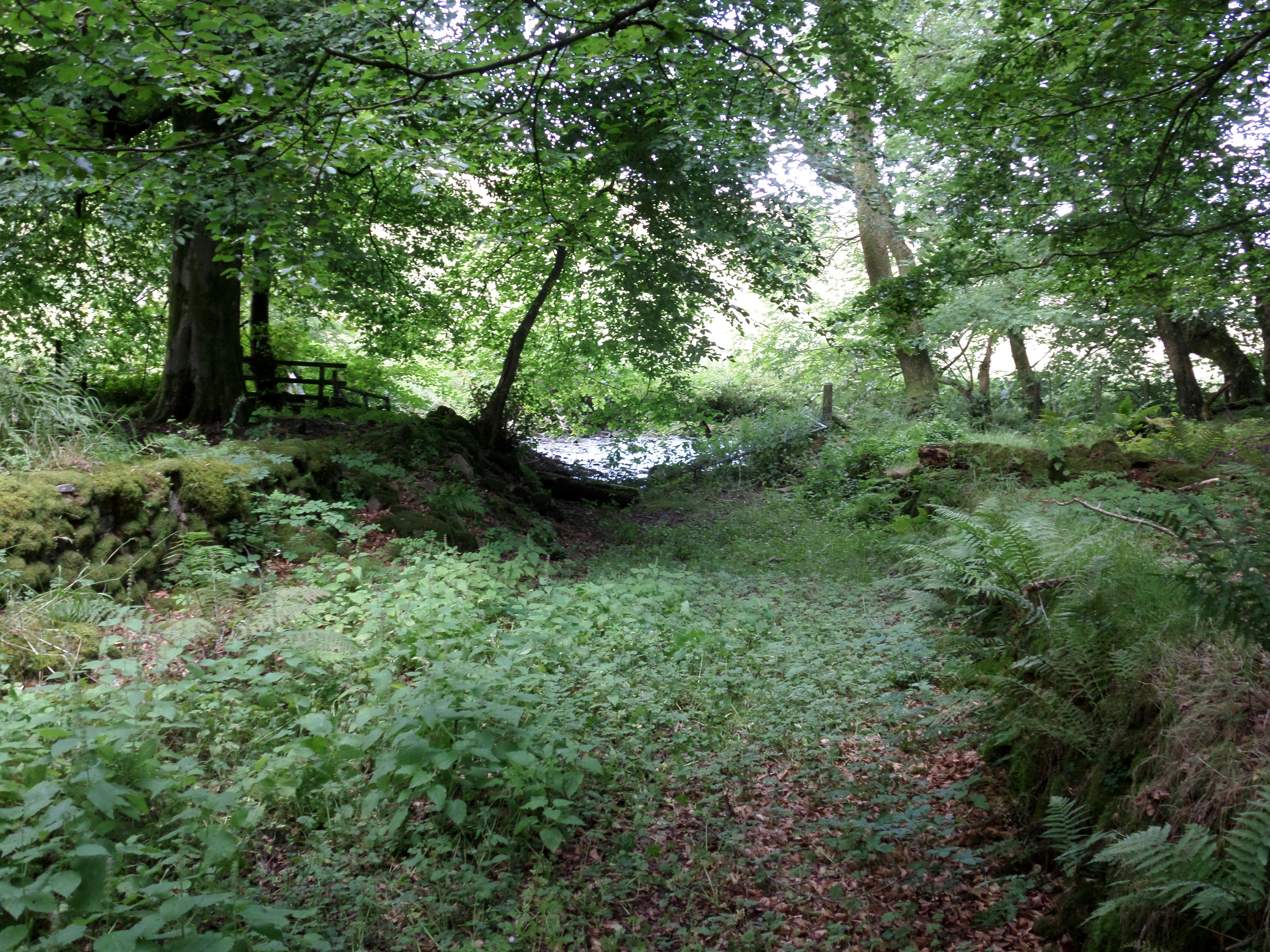
Sandy Ford Lane and the Glazert Water

The name Boarland [sic] is sometimes thought to reference the historical presence of wild boar in the area. However, the word boor could also mean a serf, and Norman lords often allocated land near their castles to their servants. Another interpretation suggests that Borland or Bordland referred to land reserved for the use of the feudal superior—specifically, in this case, Godfrey de Ross—to provide provisions for his castle or household. The name Borland survives in several local place names, including Borlandhill, Over Borland, North Borland, and Laigh Borland.

Middle Rig is located below Fox Covert Wood, with Corsbie Craigs to the south, Black Craigs to the north-west, and White Craigs just across the Glazert Water. The name Glazert may derive from the Gaelic glas, meaning 'grey' or 'green', and dur, meaning 'water'. Corsbie or Crosbie likely originates from cross, with the Scandinavian suffix -by denoting a settlement.

A rig refers to a long, narrow ridge, and a fox covert was typically a woodland area reserved for breeding and sheltering foxes, often in the context of fox hunting. A craig refers to a rocky outcrop or cliff. Sandy Ford derives its name from the coarse sand that still accumulates at the location.

== Barbara Gilmour ==
Andrew Brown of Over Hill (also known as The Hill), who died in 1791, was the grandson of John Dunlop of Over Hill and his wife, Barbara Gilmour. As previously noted, Mary Dunlop—daughter of John Dunlop of Borland and Jean Gilmour of Tailend—received half of the Borland estate, including Borland House, as part of her inheritance. She lived there with her husband, Andrew Brown, and died at The Hill in the Parish of Dunlop in 1839. The property at the time belonged to her maternal uncle by marriage.

Barbara Gilmour (or Dunlop) was a notable figure in 17th-century Ayrshire. She is credited with introducing a method of cheese-making that became widespread throughout Ayrshire and beyond. This innovation provided additional employment opportunities and supplementary income for farmers and rural workers in the region.

== Micro-history ==
A member of the Cunninghame family of Borland was reportedly involved in a raid on Drumlanrig in 1650.

In 1618, Gabriel Porterfield married Mariot Crawfurd and inherited the lands of Gills, Lothrihill, the Templelands, and the Mains of Hapland, including the mansion house. He also acquired ownership of Dunlop Hill.

According to local tradition, a ley tunnel is believed to run from the site of Laigh Borland House to Aiket Castle.

Mr 'Pop' McGaw was among the last known tenants of Laigh Borland.

An artificial fox den, constructed using stone, was located within the Fox Covert Wood. It was intended to encourage fox breeding for hunting purposes.

One of the four individuals involved in the removal of the Stone of Scone from Westminster Abbey in 1950 is said to have been a descendant of the Watt family of Laigh Borland.

== See also ==
- Dunlop, East Ayrshire
- Barbara Gilmour
- Barony and Castle of Corsehill
- Barony of Aiket
- Lands of Templehouse
- Lands of Sevenacres
