= Baron of Aiket =

Barony in Scotland

Coordinates: 55°42′20″N 4°34′02″W

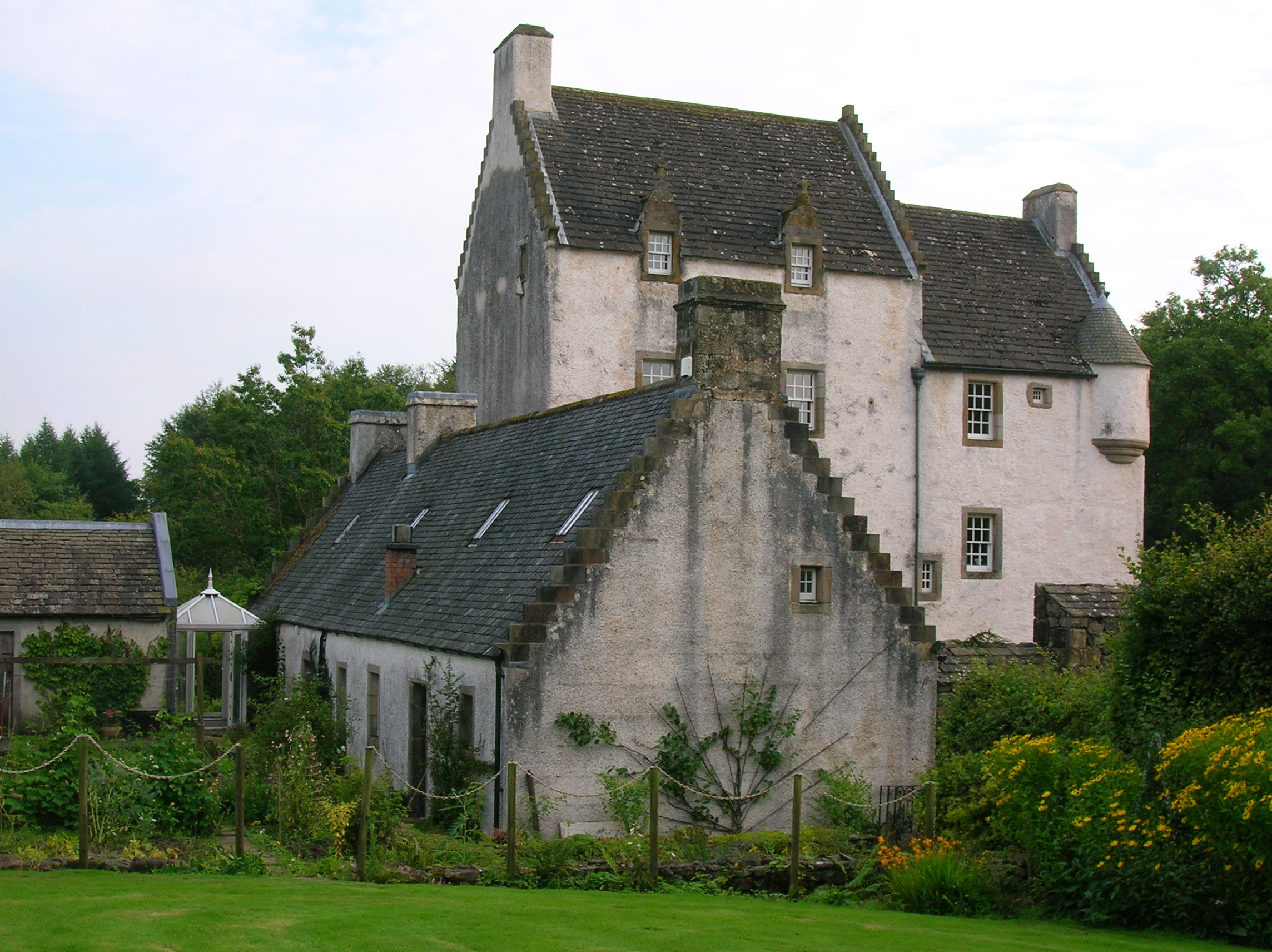
Aiket Castle and outbuildings.

Baron of Aiket is a title of nobility in the Baronage of Scotland for the holder of the Barony of Aiket with its castle, lay within the old feudal bailiary of Cunninghame. The barony lands equate to the extant Parish of Dunlop, East Ayrshire, Scotland.

== Aiket castle ==
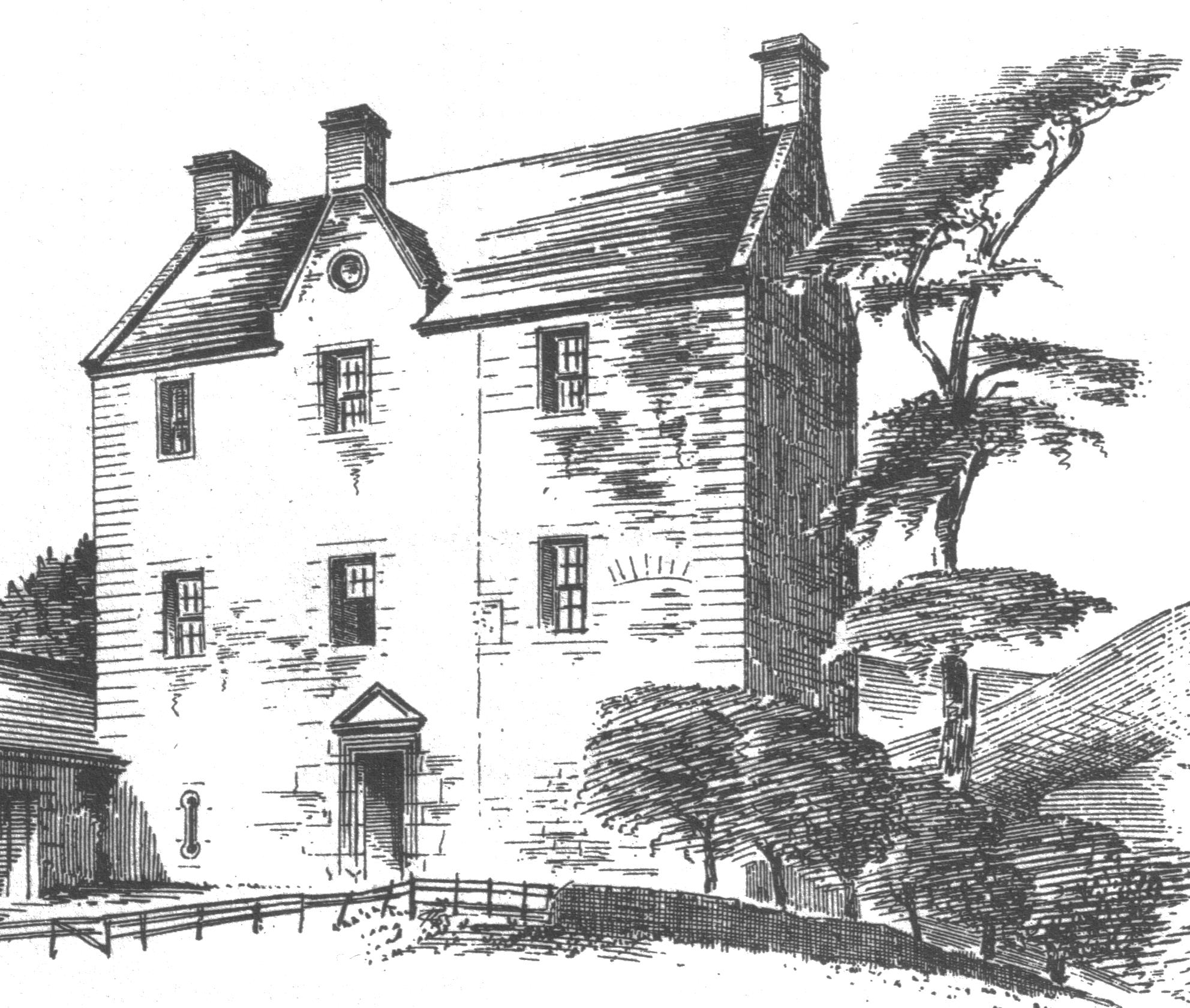
Aiket House in the 19th century

Aiket Castle itself was a four storeyed square tower typical of the residences of the lesser barons, originally surrounded by a moat and built by the Cunninghames soon after they acquired the land in 1479. Following the murder of the 4th Earl of Eglinton the castle was destroyed and then rebuilt, with an extension, in 1592. In 1734 the castle was sold and the new owners attempted to remodel the castle as a Georgian semi-classical mansion, removing the top storey in the process. The Dunlop family owned the building in the start of the 17th century and latterly it was used to house farm labourers. In 1957 the building was gutted by fire and was then restored to its pre-1734 condition. The restoration was awarded a Diploma of Merit by Europa Nostra in 1987. The placename 'Aiket' is derived from 'Oak Wood'.

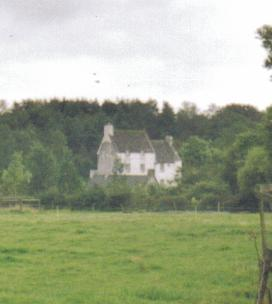
A view of Aiket Castle in 2006

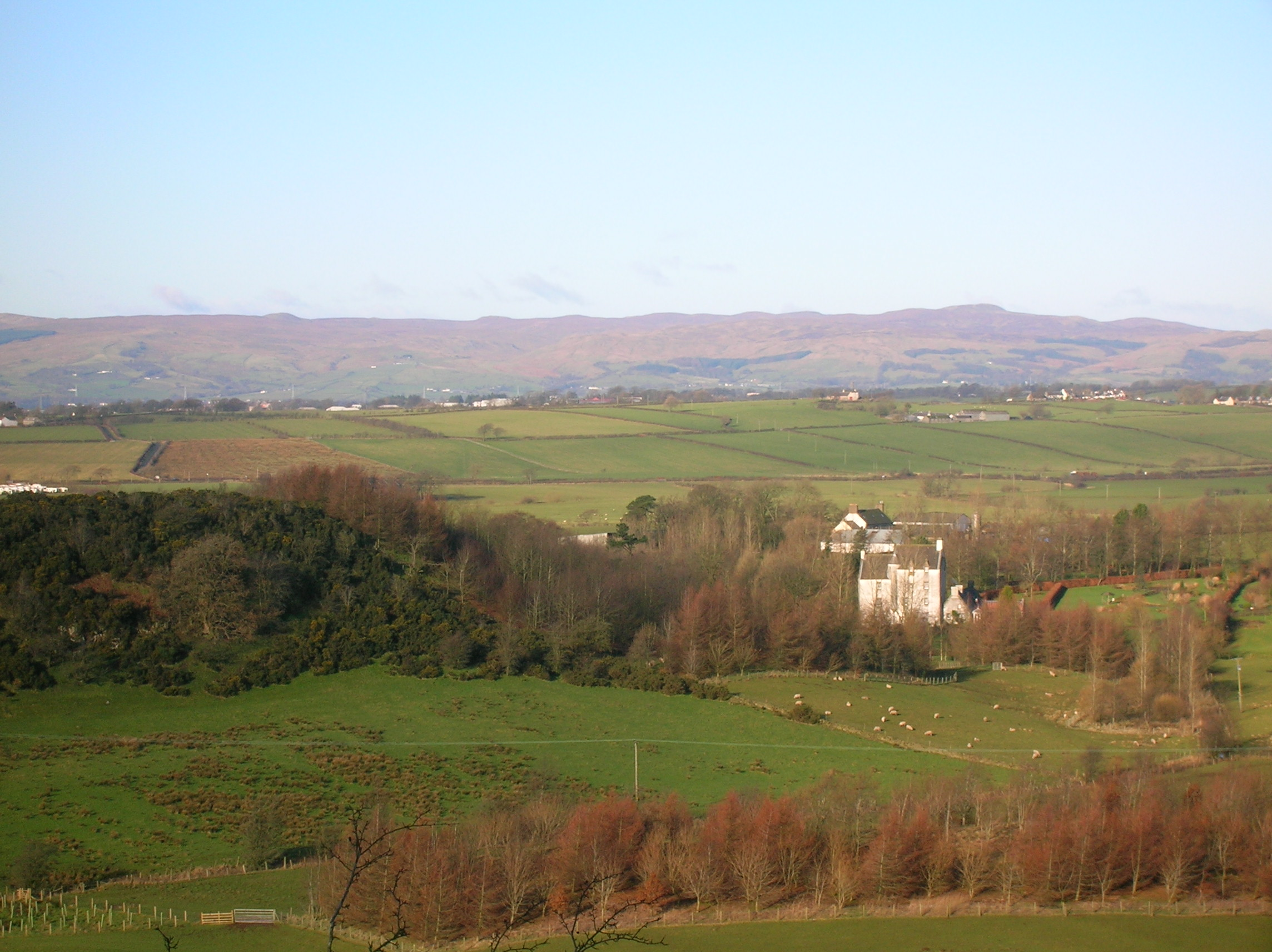
Aiket Castle and Barr Hill

=== The lairds ===
The Aiket Cunninghames were descended from the Cunninghames of Bedlands (Baidland), who in turn were cadets of the Cunninghames of Glencairn. Alexander Cunninghame is the first recorded as living at Aiket, receiving a charter from the Crown in 1479. Elizabeth Cunninghame had previously disposed of the lands to Lord Hay of Yester without permission from the Crown as feudal superior.

Robert Cunninghame seems to have been a very undesirable individual, implicated in the killing Sir John Mure of Caldwell and his own wife apparently attempted to poison him; she, Helen Colquhoun of Luss, was sent to the Court of Session at Edinburgh to answer the charge, but apparently never made it there.

==== The murder of the 4th Earl of Eglinton ====
Robert Cunninghame was also implicated in the murder of Hugh Montgomerie, 4th Earl of Eglinton in 1586; an Aiket daughter was the wife of the Laird of Lainshaw, central to the story of the murder. The Aiket Cuninghames had all their property forfeited and Robert Cunninghame was eventually shot dead in revenge, 'on or near', his own doorstep in 1586. Three Aiket daughters were married to participants in the tale of the murder of Hugh Montgomerie, Earl of Eglinton; two to Cunninghames and one, Lady Margaret, to a Montgomerie. In 1564 Cunninghame of Aicket (sic) is referred to as the 'Larde of Halkhede.'

Robert Cunninghame's wife complained bitterly when the estate was eventually returned in ruinous condition in 1592, saying: - the destruction of the policie of the place of Aiket, housis, yairdis, orcheardis and growand trees, swa that the samyn has been rivinous and laid waist, but door, windo, lok, ruf, or but ony repair, and the dewties prescrivit, rigourouslie exacted, to the great wrack of the poor tenantis, quha ar not addetit in sa mekle mail as is extortionat be thame. She appears to have rebuilt the castle in the late 16th century style, adding a lower kitchen wing to the west, with two upper floors.

In 1566 the last Roman Catholic vicar of Dunlop, John Houston, with the permission of Gavin Hamilton, commendator of Kilwinning Abbey, granted the church lands of Dunlop to William Cunnighame of Aiket. He kept an acre of land at the manse for his use and for the use of his successors.

In the 18th century the Dunlops made the castle more fashionable by cutting off the tower and regularising the windows. A disastrous fire in 1957 left the castle with only two vaults and three walls standing, however Robert and Katrina Clow restored the building in the mid-seventies.

Tradition has it that one of the Cunninghames of Aiket hanged a Gemmill at Templehouse using the rafters of the victims own house.

=== The Spectral Knight of Hessilhead and the Bride of Aiket ===
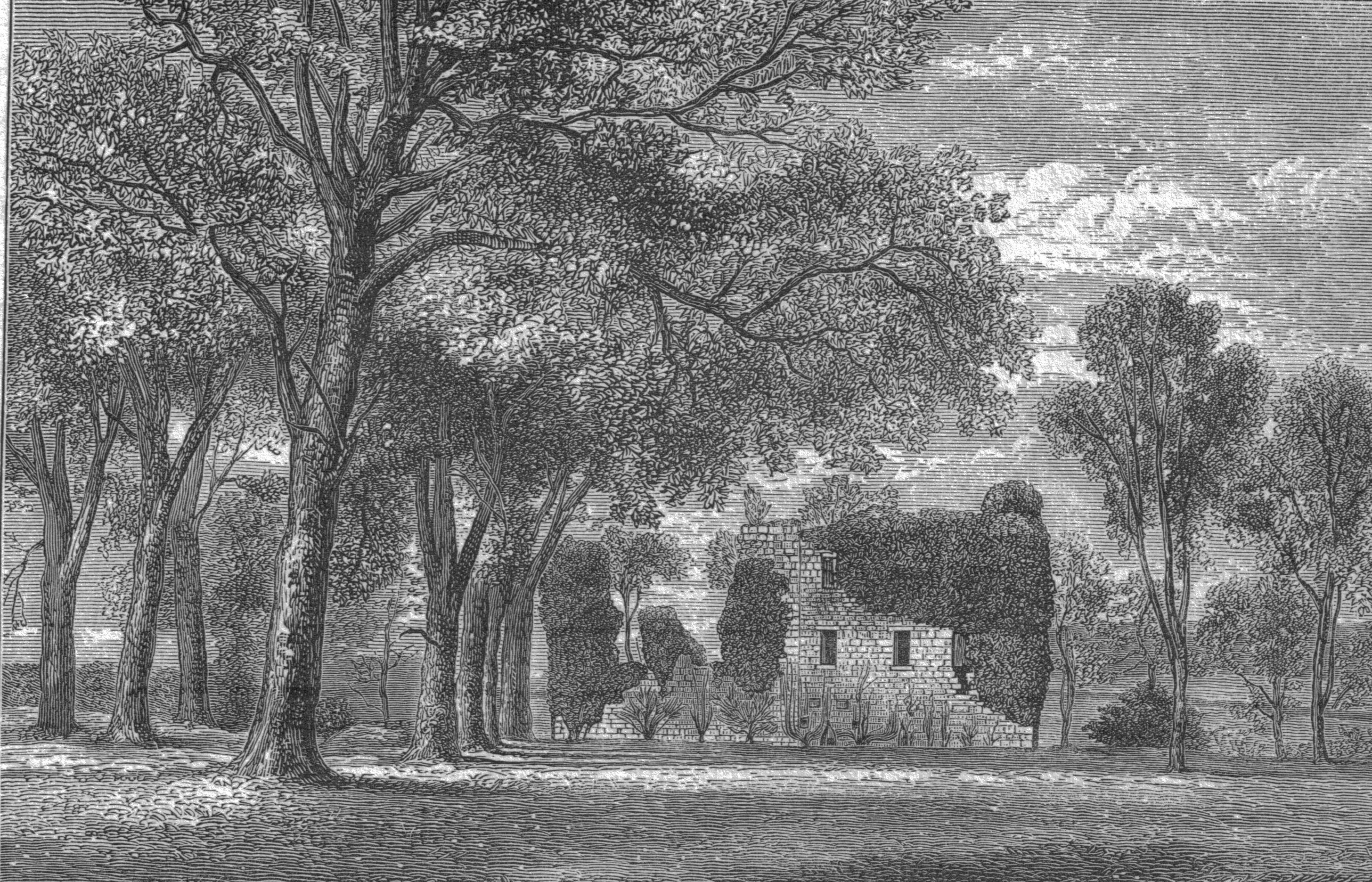
Hessilhead (Hasil head) castle in 1876

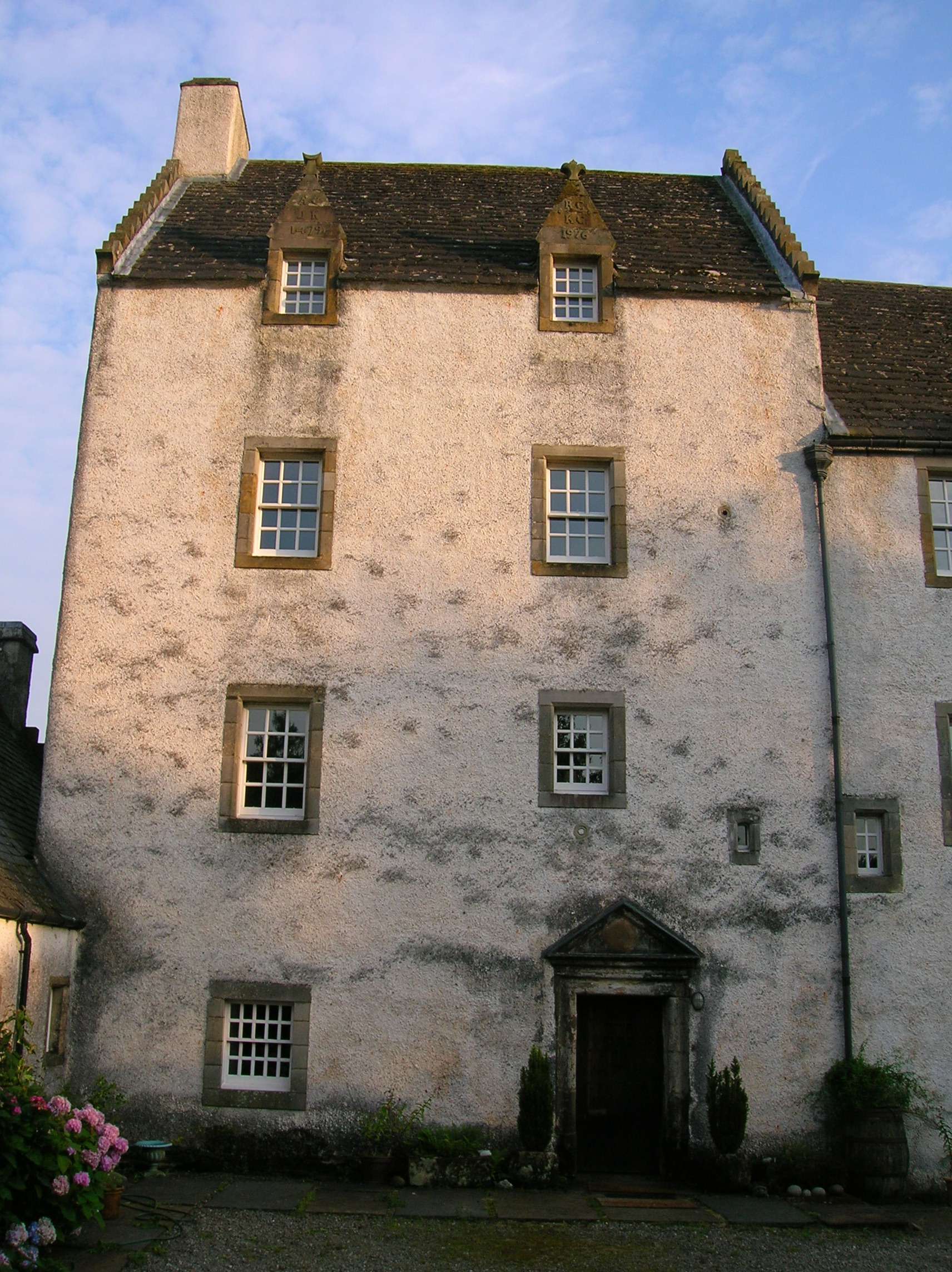
Aiket's main entrance

Anna Cunninghame of Aiket was pledged to marry her true love, Henry Montgomerie of Hessilhead. They were to marry upon his return from the crusades, however Allan Lockhart, son of a neighbouring Baron began to pay increasingly frequent visits to the inmates of Aiket Castle. His courtship was in vain and he would have no success unless the Crusades were to claim Henry. After many more months had passed Allan decided to use trickery and eventually persuaded a footsoldier recently returned from the Crusades to tell the false tale of the death of Henry Montgomerie. The ruse was carried off with success and after a short while Allan pressed his attentions again and the marriage day was set. On that very day Henry returned to Hessilhead castle and discovered the treacherous act, however he fell from his horse on his way to claim his bride and died within minutes.

At twelve o'clock midnight the wedding feast was halted abruptly by the figure of the fully armour clad Henry Montgomerie striding into Aiket Castle hall, lifting up the Lady Anna and then vanishing into the night. Neither soldier nor bride were ever found. The Lockhart, Loccard or Lockhard family are believed to have been the first owners of the Barony of Kilmarnock.

"For there, by Glazert's lonely stream,
A lovely maiden swore
to be my bride, when I returned
Again to Scotia's shore."

==== Anna Inglis and William Cunningham ====
History records some facts that may in some way relate to the tale of the 'Spectral bride'. A Montgomerie of Hessilhead was pledged to marry an Anna Inglis, daughter of Thomas and Marion of Corsflat in Paisley. Anna's mother, Marion Peibles, was related to the Montgomeries. The Thomas Inglis died and Marion then married an Allan Lockhart (b. 1593), son of Allan Lockhart of Cleghorn near Lanark. Allan Lockhart forced his step-daughter, who was not yet 12 years old, to marry William Cunningham of Aiket, his cousin.

William received a dowry of 40,000 merks and upon the marriage, however he beat and starved his young wife, spending his time with harlots in Paisley. His wife petitioned for a divorce and succeeded in 1641, however William (d. 1645) left her burdened with 10,000 merks debt. Anna had a son, James Cunningham, who became a Paisley burgess in 1668.

=== Aiket Mill ===
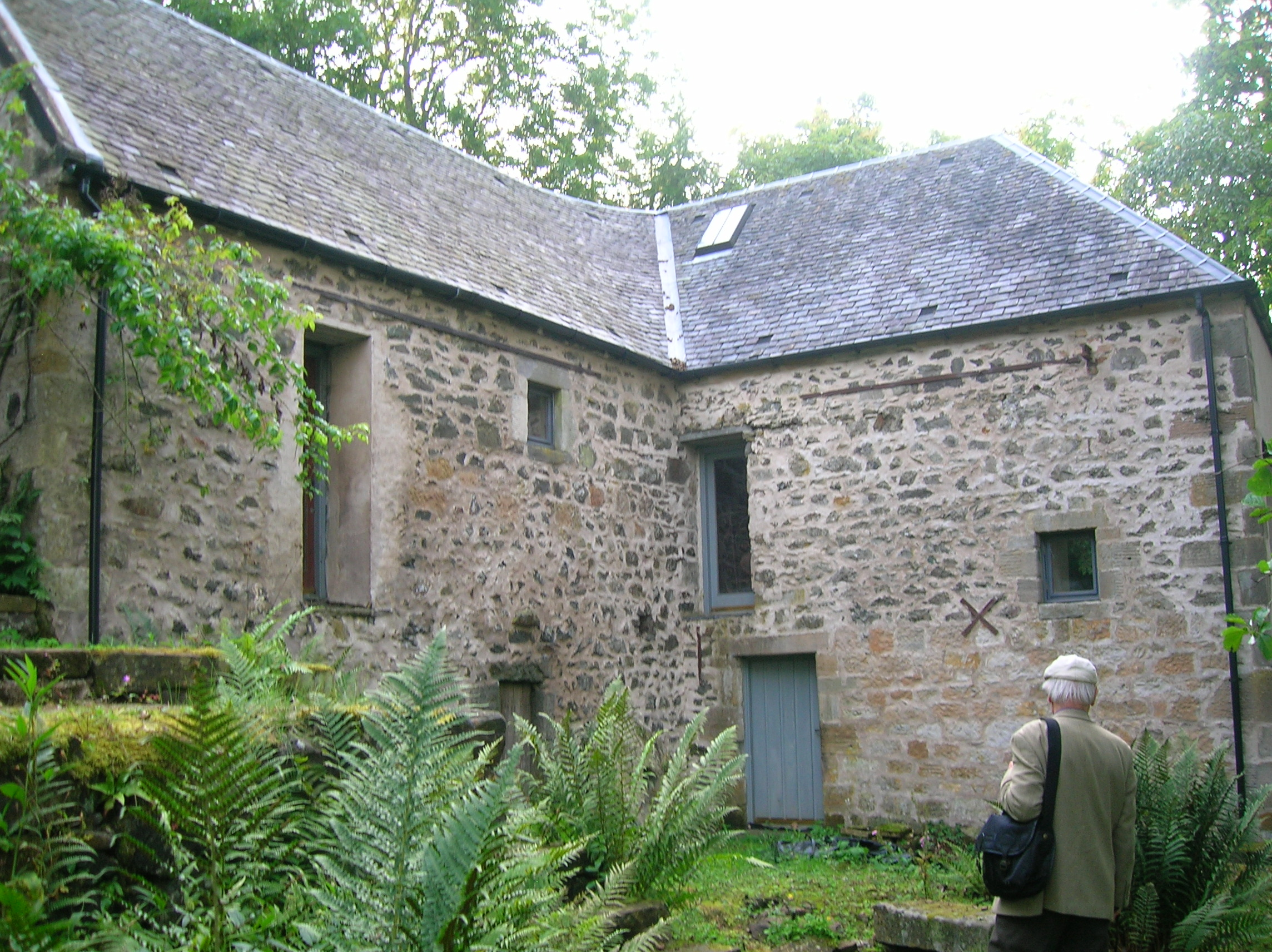
The restored Aiket Mill.

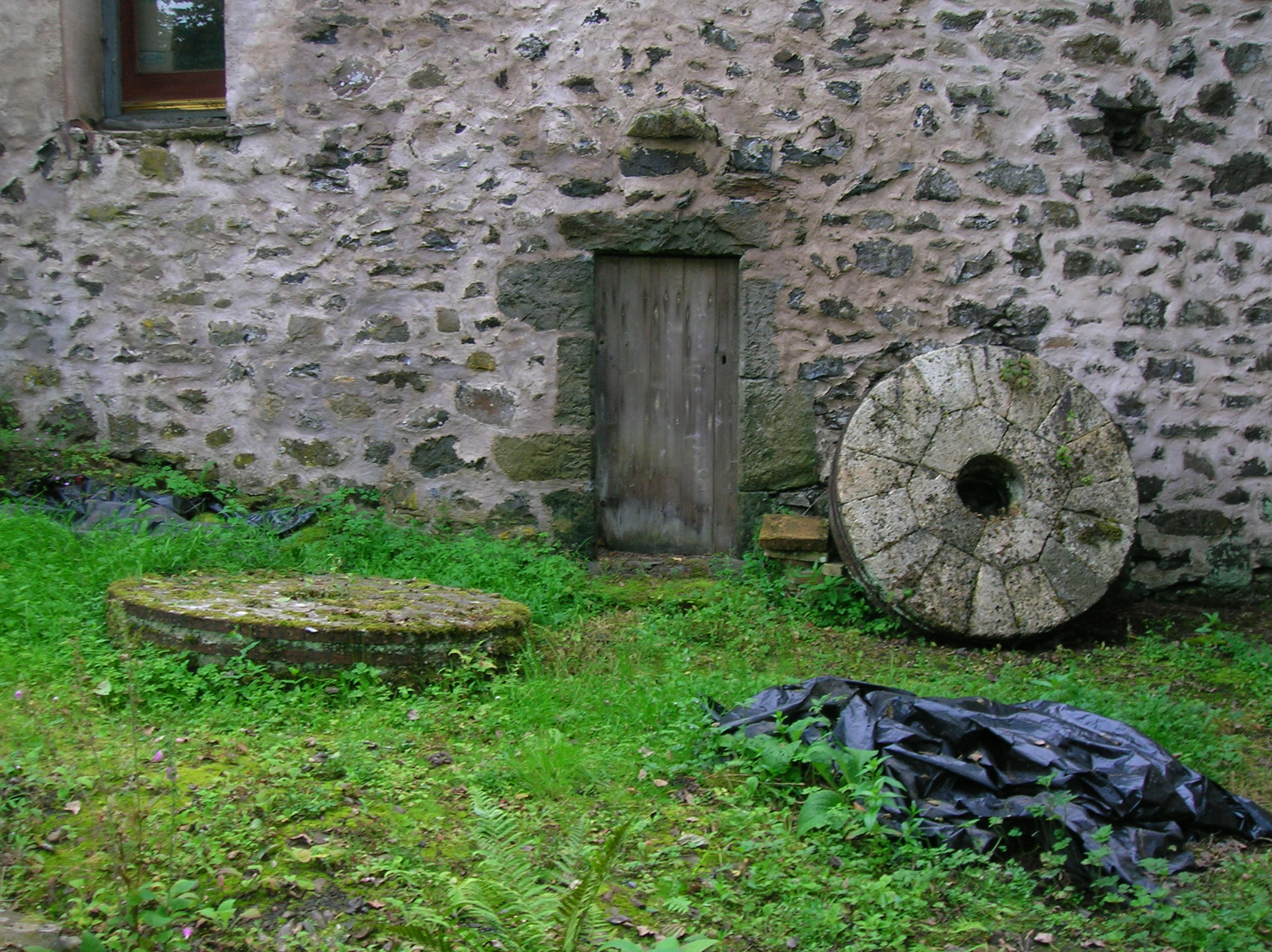
Old millstones at the mill

The corn mill on the Glazert Water at Aiket is first marked on the 1890 OS map. It has been restored as a dwelling, however the waterwheel is no longer in situ. Several millstones are located at the site and the mill race is in good condition and substantially built. Bloak Holm mill was located nearby, a little further down the Glazert Water and is recorded as being part of the Kirkwood Estate in the 18th century.

The surviving Aiket millstones are made of French Burr which came in sections and the millwright had to turn these into a usable millstone. The sections were shaped and then the pieces of the jigsaw puzzle such were fitted together to give him the overall shape and size required. Once assembled, a set of iron tyres were fitted around them, in exactly the same way as a wheelwright would prepare a wooden wagon wheel. When cold, the metal tyre is made a little too small to fit around the stones, but when heated expansion caused it to become just large enough to drop into place. The cooling metal attempts to shrink back to its original size, gripping the pieces of the stone tightly. The stones were sealed with plaster of paris, poured into every crack and the working face was also coated to help cement the stones together, and to keep the dirt out.

=== Braikenheuch Hill ===
This hill, its name meaning the 'Bracken Crag', lies about a mile and a half from Dunlop. It is said to be the site of the death of one of the Cunninghames of Aiket, killed by a Montgomerie during the times of the feuds between these families. The area is now known as the 'Brechna Braes.'

== See also ==
- Barony of Peacockbank
- Chapeltoun
- Corsehill
- Lambroughton
- Lands of Borland
- Restoration of castles in Scotland
