= Lands of Templehouse =

Coordinates: 55.7063°N 4.5435°W

Lands of Templeland of Dunlop Hill: Scots: Templehouse
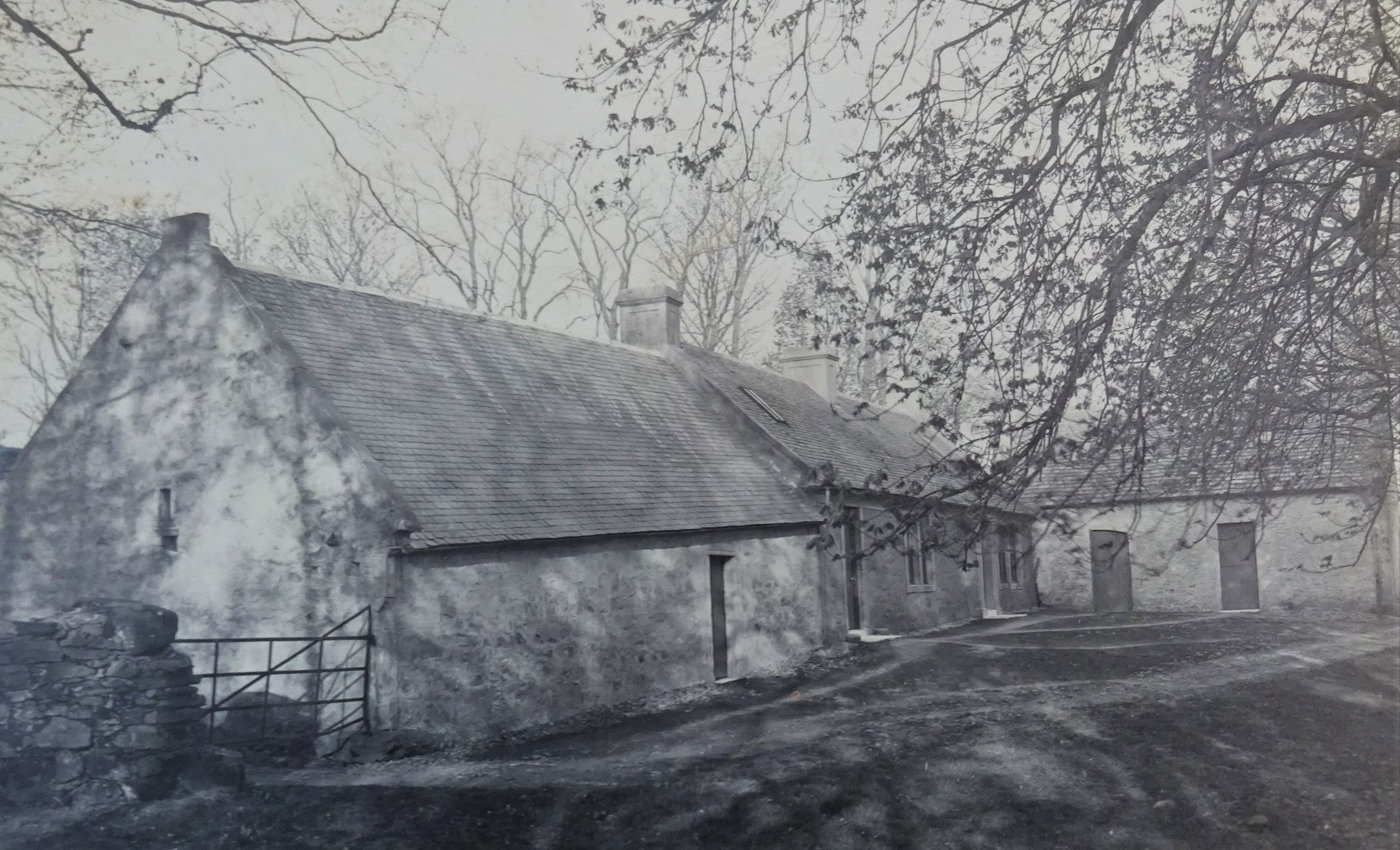
- Templehouse in 1913

- Location within East Ayrshire
- OS grid reference: NS403488
- Council area: East Ayrshire
- Lieutenancy area: Ayrshire
- Country: Scotland
- Sovereign state: United Kingdom
- Post town: Kilmarnock
- Police: Scotland
- Fire: Scottish
- Ambulance: Scottish

The Lands of Templehouse formed a small estate lying between Aiket Castle and the town of Dunlop, East Ayrshire, Parish of Dunlop, Scotland. The laird's house at Templeland of Dunlop Hill, to give it its formal name, stood near to the ancient road leading from Dunlop to Kirkwood and on to Kennox. The lands were held by the Knights Templar until a date prior to 1570 when the Gemmells of Templehouse were granted the property and remained there until 1962, a period of around 500 years. The spelling 'Gemmell' is used for consistency except where otherwise denoted.

== History ==
The Gemmells were originally minor lairds, sometimes known as 'bonnet lairds', smaller landowners who wore a hat or bonnet like the humble working labourers. They tended to marry other farming lairds as recorded on their gravestones in Dunlop churchyard. The Lands of Borland stood to the north-west, South and North Netherhouses lie to the east, with Mains of Aiket and (East) Netherhill to the south. The property's name variously had the form, Templehouse, Temple House or Tempilhouse and was formally denoted as "the tempillandis of Dunlophill".

A fire at Templehouse in the eighteenth century destroyed the family records so no proof of their residency at Templehouse before 1474 survives.

Templehouse is still (datum 2020) locally known as "Minnie Gemmell's" after the last occupant.

=== The Laird's House, Farm and the Estate ===
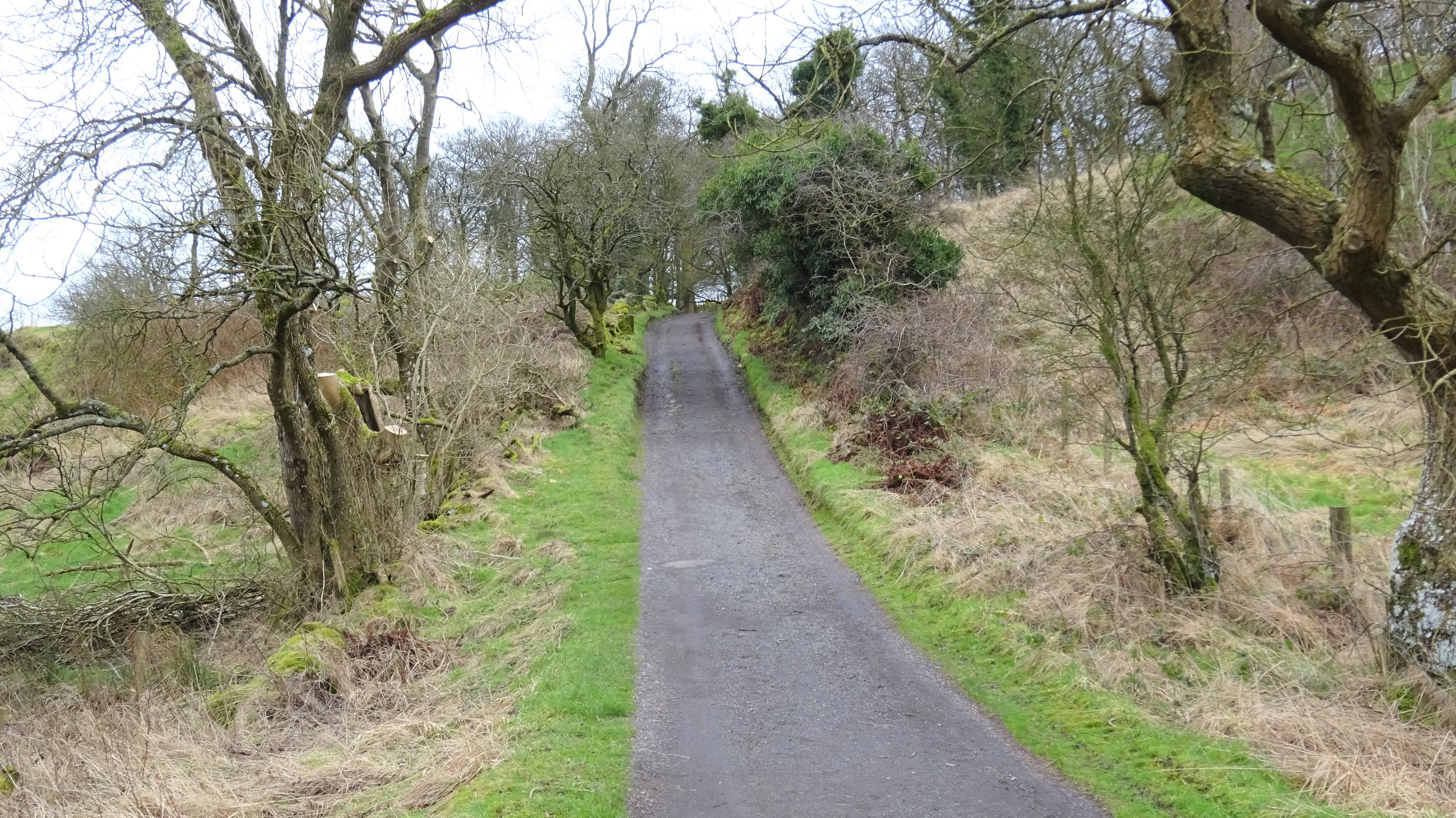
Access lane to Templehouse

The Knights Templar's ownership of the lands are remembered in the name of this property.

In 1856 an OS map shows a similar walled garden enclosure to that at Borland. It covered just over half an acre, had a significant height and had a vehicular entrance facing to the east and a pedestrian access via steps to the cottages at the north. The formal paths divided the garden into four squares each of which are shown to have been planted with trees as in a typical orchard. Another map shows chevron shaped paths and beds at both walled gardens.

The roof is said to have had large slates, very small rooms and crowstepped gables. Interestingly one of the rooms is thought to have had a coved, painted ceiling. It is not known what damage was caused by the 18th century fire and this may account for the loss of more ancient architectural features.

The farm in 1913 consisted of two cottages attached to a byre and a separate building at right angles that may have served as an animal feed store and stable, etc. The cottages have some well carved stonework and may be early 19th century, but earlier than the walled garden whilst the byre appears older. The walled garden was unusually built onto the gable end of the western cottage. The other main building, built in an older different style, was quite sizeable. No clear indications of a typically spacious laird's house or more ancient buildings survives.

A large yard lay in front of the buildings, now covered with rubble. Roads joined the house with (East) Netherhill, Mains of Aiket, South Netherhouses and North Netherhouses. A small whinstone quarry lay to the east that may have been utilised to provide the whinstone for the walled garden and a smaller one above may have been adapted as a bunker for the old golf course.

John Gemmil (sic) in 1820 held Templehouse at the valued rent of £50 and a John Gemmil (sic) also held Leahead and part of Aiket at £27. The Netherhouses were held by Mrs Gemmil (sic) and A. Brown Esq. at £100 6s 8d. Thorn was held by a David Gemmil (sic) at £53 6s 8d.

It was described circa 1855 as "A neat farm house with outbuildings and an excellent garden attached, the property and residence of John Gemmell Esqr."

=== The Knights Templars in Cunninghame ===
The Knights Templar had owned considerable lands and properties in the bailiary of Cunninghame and in the early 17th century, Robert Montgomerie acquired the rights to these Templelands from the Sandilands family of Calder, the Lords Torphichen and thus became the feudal superiors. The value of these lands largely lay in their near exemption from taxation. In about 1720 the lands passed to the Wallaces of Carnell, at Fiveways near Kilmarnock. Later Dr. Robert Patrick of Trearne & Hessilhead purchased the superiority, although this was of little real value after the abolition of heritable jurisdictions in 1747.

=== The Gemmell Lairds ===
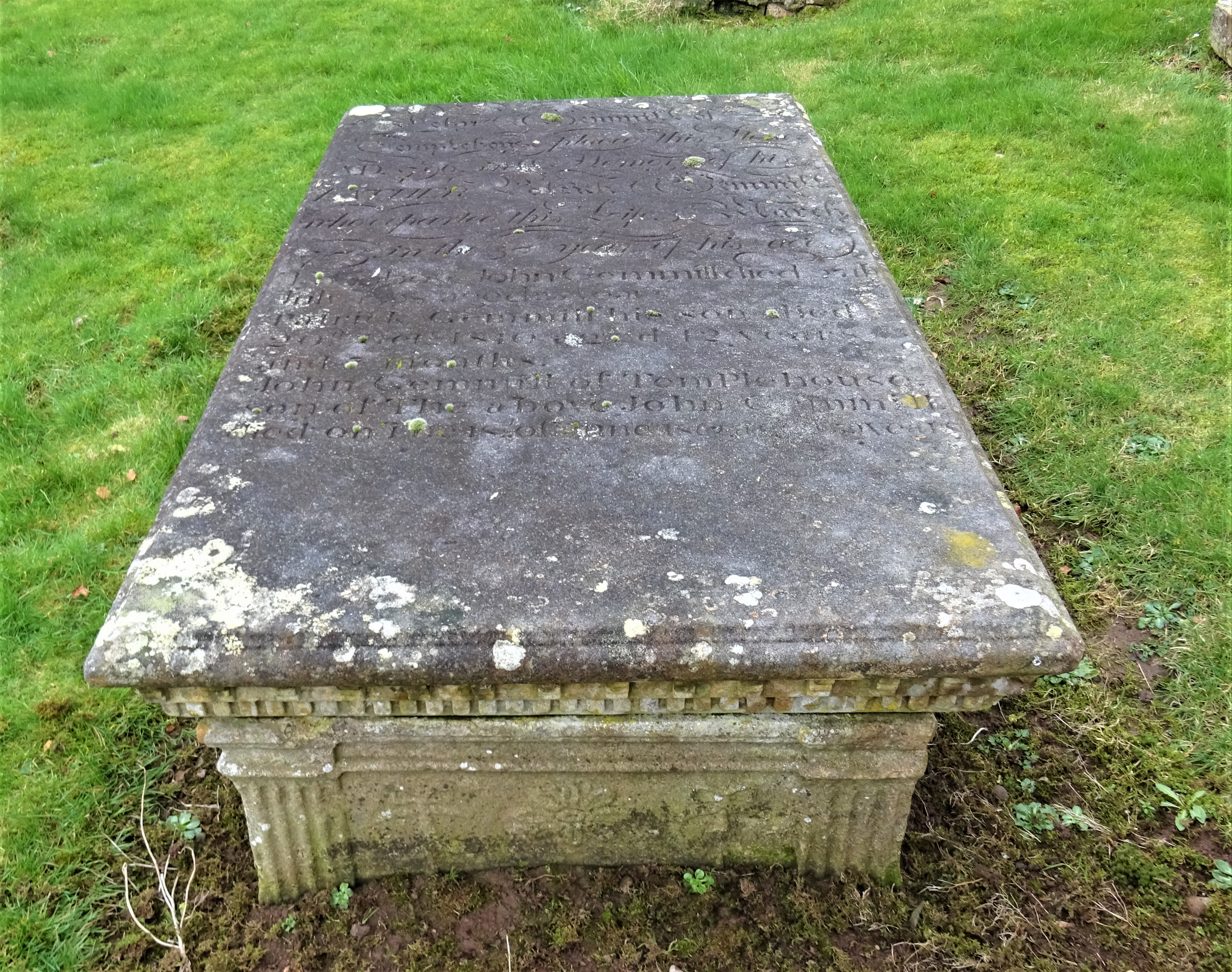
Gemmill family tomb at Dunlop Church.

The genealogy is hard to follow with repeated use of John for the eldest son and Patrick being another popular first name over the generations.

In 1425 a John Gemmell held Templehouse and in 1474 Johnne Gemmill (sic) was heir to Templehouse, which included the lands of Holehouse, (East) Netherhill and Thorn.

In 1570 Patrick Gemmell was a member of the jury in the case of the murder of John Mure of Caldwell. William Cunninghame of Aiket, a neighbour, was one of those on trial for the act.

In 1559 Patrick Gemmell was granted Templehouse by the Temple Court at Ayr, the feudal superior being John Spottiswood, preceptor of Torphichen.

Patrick Gemmell was born in Templehouse in 1590 and married Margaret Montgomerie. They had a son Robert in 1620 who married Janet Baird. The couple had a daughter Janet in 1650 who married Mathew Richmond. Another son, John, was married to Agnes and had children John, William and David.

Tradition has it that one of the Cunninghames of Aiket hanged a Gemmell at Templehouse using the rafters of the victims own house. This most likely related to an incident in January 1601 when Thomas Cunninghame and others broke down the door at Templehouse, forced Patrick and his wife out of their bed. His wife was bound head and foot and placed in large chest whilst Patrick was pressured to give them his sliver and gold, however he refused and he was then hung by the neck from a timber beam for a considerable time until Thomas cut him down. The burglars took all the valuable items they could find and tied them up in sheets which three women carried. The sixty year old Patrick was taken prisoner and despite a storm was taken 28 miles from Templehouse. Thomas Cunninghame was tried and executed.

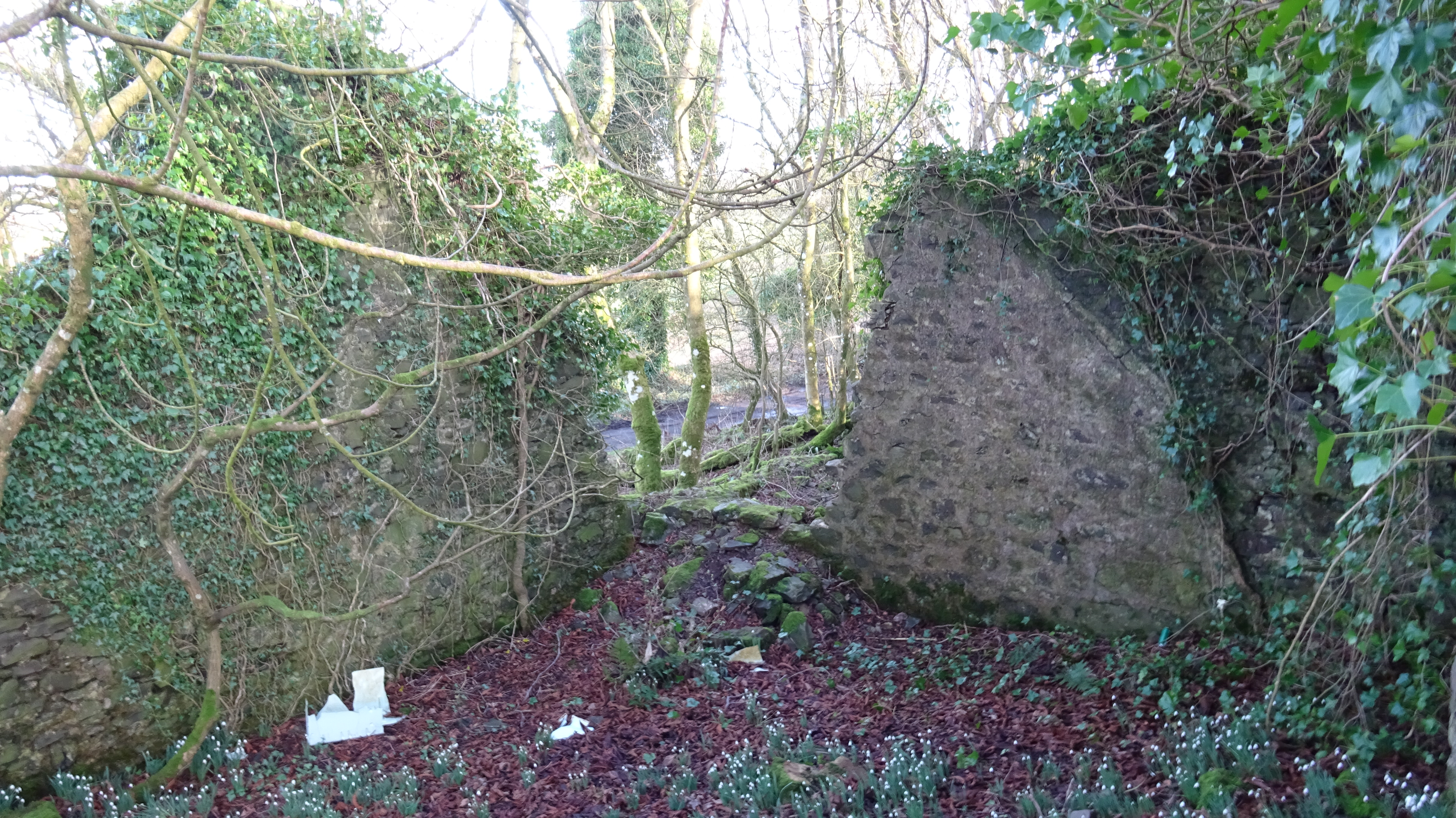
Ruins of the old stable and feed store.

In 1596 Patrick Gemmell resigned the Templelands of Dunlop Hill into the hands of the Superior, Lord Torphichen, in favour of his eldest son John, a regularly occurring family first name. John married Isobel Ross and had a son John who married Elizabeth Howie, who died in Dunlop parish in August 1616. Both John's died before Patrick Gemmell and the brother of the eldest son of Patrick, also Patrick, obtained the lands as granted by Robert Montgomerie of Hessilhead and Tempill Cunynghame, although the father retained th liferent.

In 1656 the above Patrick's son, John Gemmell, had a charter to hold Templehouse with his intended wife for the length of the life of the longest lived.

John Gemmill (sic) of Templehouse (b.1700. d.1784) married an heiress, Janet Dunlop (b.1702. d.1742) of Holehouse in 1724. Their second son, John, inherited Holehouse and married Mary Dunlop of Loanhead. A descendant of Janet, John A. Gemmill of Ottawa, replaced their gravestone at Dunlop in 1897. Their eldest son, Patrick, inherited Templehouse.

In the early 18th century Mary Mackie, daughter of William Mackie of Townhead of Fulwood, married Patrick Gemmell of Templehouse.

In 1754 John Gemmell obtained the lands of Templehouse from his grandfather as granted by the feudal superior, William Wallace of Carnell and held the sasine from 1759.

In 1789 John's grandson, also John, inherited through his father Patrick as eldest son, his father having predeceased his own father. This was granted by the superior, Thomas Wallace of Carnell.

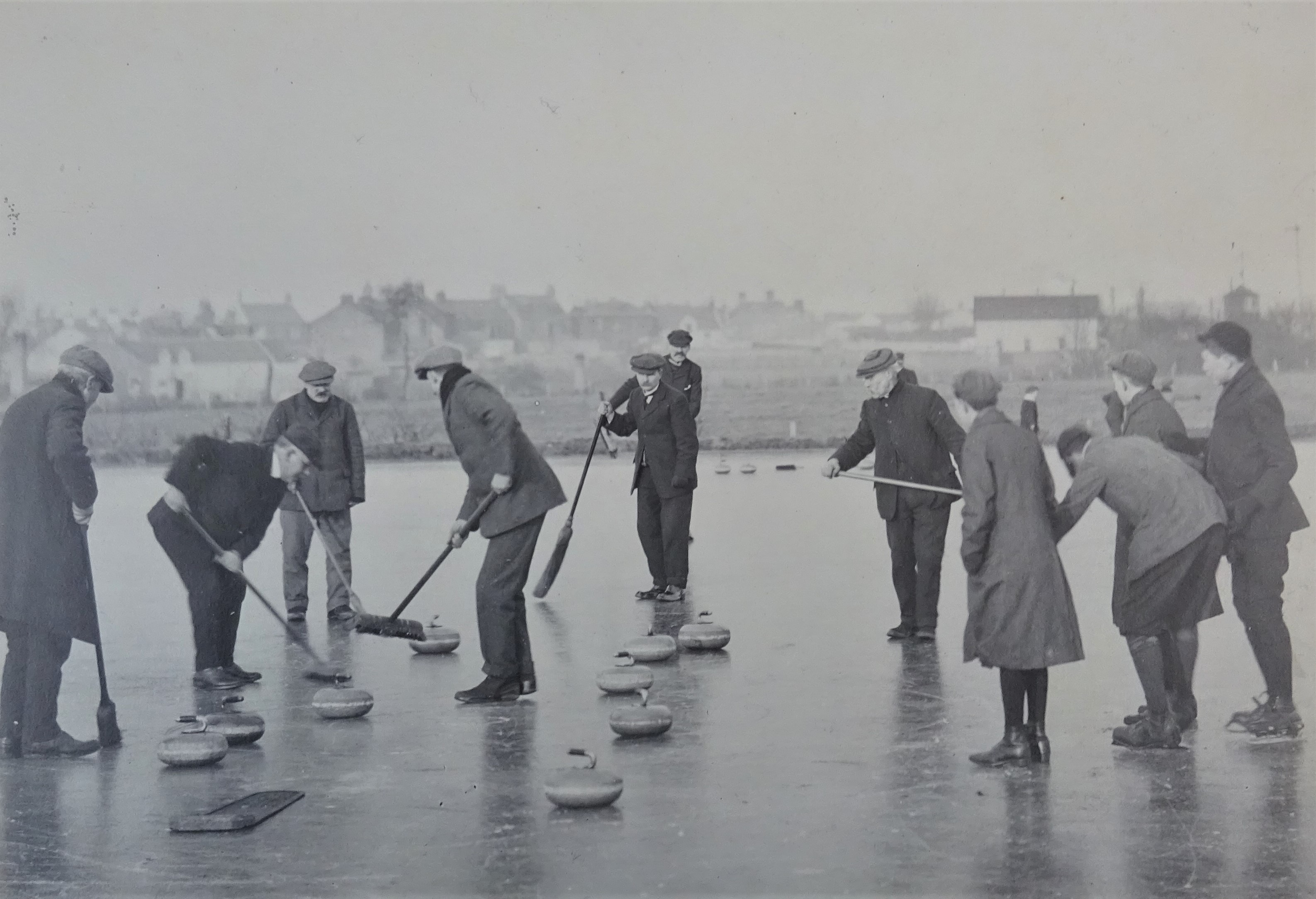
Dunlop Curling Pond at Minnie's Meadow.

In 1796 John Gemmell of Templehouse placed a memorial stone at Dunlop to the memory of his father Patrick. The stone also commemorates Jonh's son Patrick who died aged 12 in 1810.

John Gemmell's son, again a John, inherited Templehouse and circa 1866 his son John was the proprietor.

John Gemmell in 1874 was succeeded by Patrick Gemmell of Templehouse and (East) Netherhill who married Janet Chalmers, daughter of John Chalmers of Stewarton. The couple had children, Mary Anderson and Jane Brown.

Three Gemmell sisters purchased Templehouse with around 50 acres and lived there for the rest of their lives. One sister had a daughter, but did not marry. In 1935 the communion roll of Dunlop Church records a Miss Alice Gemmell at Loanhead, with a Margaret and Minnie Gemmill (sic) at Templehouse. It was Minnie who lived at Templehouse without mains electricity or water until she died in 1962. No heirs could be located and Minnie refused to make a will as she wished the property to return to the crown "..from whence it came", the house and walled garden are now completely ruinous. Some demolition took place when an unstable gable end was in danger of falling onto the lane that takes a right angle bend around the site.

Some members of the Gemmells of Templehouse moved to Ireland from Templehouse at the time of the Plantation of Ulster in the early 1600s.

A number of Gemmell family memorial stones are located in the Dunlop Church cemetery close to the John Hamilton mausoleum.

== Natural history ==
The site has a number of large sycamores (Acer pseudoplatanus) with some ash and oak. The ground flora of the old walled garden in spring is dominated by the non-native snowdrop (Galanthus nivalis) often planted on estates and the rare non-native winter heliotrope (Petasites pyrenaicus). The old woodland indicator plant sweet woodruff (Galium odoratum) and bluebells (Hyacinthoides non-scripta) are present. The invasive rhododendron (Rhododendron ponticum) has been planted at the site and hart's tongue ferns (Asplenium scolopendrium) thrive on the lime mortar of the ruined walls as do maidenhair spleenworts (Asplenium trichomanes).

== Cartographic evidence ==
Temple House (sic) is first shown by name on the 1828 map produced by Thomson. The dwelling is shown lying close to the road that branches of at Dunlop Church and runs down to Kirkwood via Borland. By 1895 the walled garden is shown without paths or trees. A path running north-east led to a well in the wood. A small yard lay behind the feed store and stable. The feed store had a small lean to on the southern gable end.

== Dunlop Golf Course ==
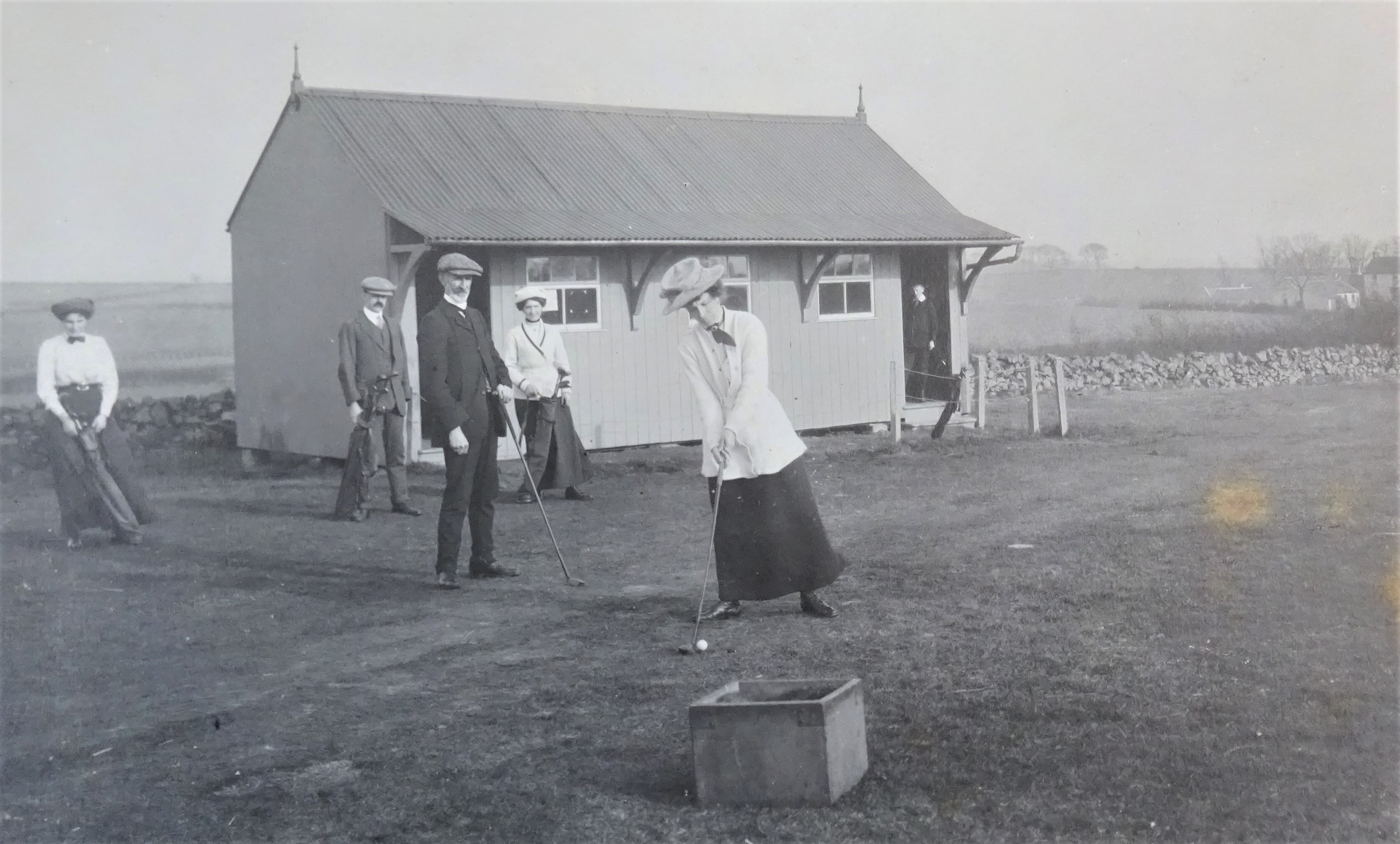
Dunlop Golf Club pavilion in 1913.

The Dunlop Golf Club Course had nine holes and was at first located at Hapland in 1908 but moved to Templehouse in 1909 where it remained until closure in 1922. The ground was reported to be "of a sporting character, being varied and undulating. It is about a twelve minute walk from the station, and about two miles from Stewarton. The membership fee of 10 shillings for gentlemen and 5s for ladies is very moderate. In 1914 the secretary was J H Marr, 2 Mansfield Terrace. A 9 hole course situated on Templehouse Grounds with a membership of 150. There was no entry fee. Subs were 12/6d. Visitors’ fees were 1/- a day and 2/6d a week. Sunday play was not allowed." The only remains are that of a bunker that overlooks the ruins of Templehouse. It operated from 1911 through to 1915 and at the AGM the freedom of the course was granted to all military personnel, nurses and staff stationed at the Dunlop House Military Hospital; in addition they decided to retain the membership of those members serving in the Forces. A bunker may still survive at the site of a small whinstone quarry near the old house ruins.

== Curling pond ==
The Dunlop Curling Pond, still in use in 1913, lay on the land overlooked by Templehouse, still known locally as Minnie's Meadow (datum 2020) and this was fed by the Hill and Templehouse Burns.

== Micro-history ==
In 1618 Gabriel Porterfield married Marion Crawfurd and inherited the lands of Gills, Lothrihill, the Templeland and Maynes (Mains) of Hapland, including the mansion house and he also acquired Dunlop Hill.

== See also ==
- Dunlop, East Ayrshire
- Barony and Castle of Corsehill
- Barony of Aiket
- Lands of Borland
