= Excambion =

In Scots law, excambion is the exchange of land. The deed whereby this is effected is termed "Contract of Excambion". There is an implied real warranty in this contract, so that if one portion is evicted or taken away on a superior title, the party losing the property is entitled to demand the return of the other given in exchange.

Entailed lands were allowed, under certain limitations and conditions, to be exchanged by the Entail Improvement Act 1770 (10 Geo. 3. c. 51), extended by the Entail Powers Act 1836 (6 & 7 Will. 4. c. 42), and still more so by the Entail Amendment Act 1848 (11 & 12 Vict. c. 36), s. 5 (1848).

Alternate spellings include "excambie", "excamb", "excambiator" (an exchanger, a broker). The term is derived from Latin "excambium" (n. an exchange).

== See also ==
- Tailzie
- Property law

== Sources and references ==
- Barclay, Hugh (1855). A Digest of the Law of Scotland (Second Edition). Edinburgh: T. & T. Clark. p. 319.
- Shumaker, Walter A.; George Foster Longsdorf (1922). The Cyclopedic Law Dictionary (Second Edition by James C. Cahill ed.). Chicago: Callaghan and Company. p. 376.
- "Scottish Language Dictionaries". Archived from the original on 20 February 2008. (entry "excamb")
