= Hugh Colvill Goldsmith =

British Royal Navy lieutenant

- Born: 2 April 1789; Saint Andrews, New Brunswick
- Died: October 8, 1841 (aged 52)
- Occupation: Royal Navy lieutenant

Hugh Colvill Goldsmith (2 April 1789 – 8 October 1841) was a British Royal Navy lieutenant.

== Biography ==
Goldsmith son of Henry, son of the eldest brother of Oliver Goldsmith the author. A brother, Charles Goldsmith, was a commander in the navy (1795–1854). Hugh was born at St. Andrews, New Brunswick, on 2 April 1789, and having served his time as a midshipman in the navy was promoted to the rank of lieutenant on 27 January 1809. After the peace he seems to have been employed chiefly in the preventive service, and in 1824 commanded the Nimble revenue cutter on the coast of Cornwall. On 8 April, landing near the headland called Trereen Castle in search of some smuggled goods, he went up to look at the Logan Rock, a rocking stone which weighs about eighty tons; and being told that ‘it was not in the power of man to remove it,’ he took it into his head to try. Accordingly, when his boat had finished dragging for the suspected goods, he called his men up and tried to move the stone with three handspikes. These were of no avail; they were therefore laid aside, and the nine men, taking hold of the rock by the edge, without great difficulty set it in a rocking motion, which became so great that to try to stop it seemed dangerous, lest it should fall back on the men. So it presently rocked itself off its pivot, falling away about thirty-nine inches, and lying inclined on the adjacent rocks. According to Goldsmith's positive statement, in a letter to his mother written a few days afterwards (Household Words, 1852, vi. 234), he had no intention or thought of doing mischief. He did not know of the value placed on the rock by the neighbourhood, and was thunderstruck when he found the uproar that his deed occasioned. As soon, however, as he realised the way in which his exploit was regarded, he determined to do what he could to replace the stone. The admiralty lent him tackles, sheers, capstans, and men. The work began on 29 October, and on Tuesday, 2 Nov., the stone was again in its place, rocking as before, though whether better or worse is disputed. Lithographed views of the process of replacing the stone were published at Penzance in 1824. Many common statements about the matter are authoritatively denied. Goldsmith was never promoted, and as lieutenant commanding the Megæra died at sea off St. Thomas in the West Indies on 8 October 1841.
