= Thurgartstone =

Glacial erratic stone near Dunlop, Scotland

Coordinates: 55°43′9.6″N 4°32′22.8″W

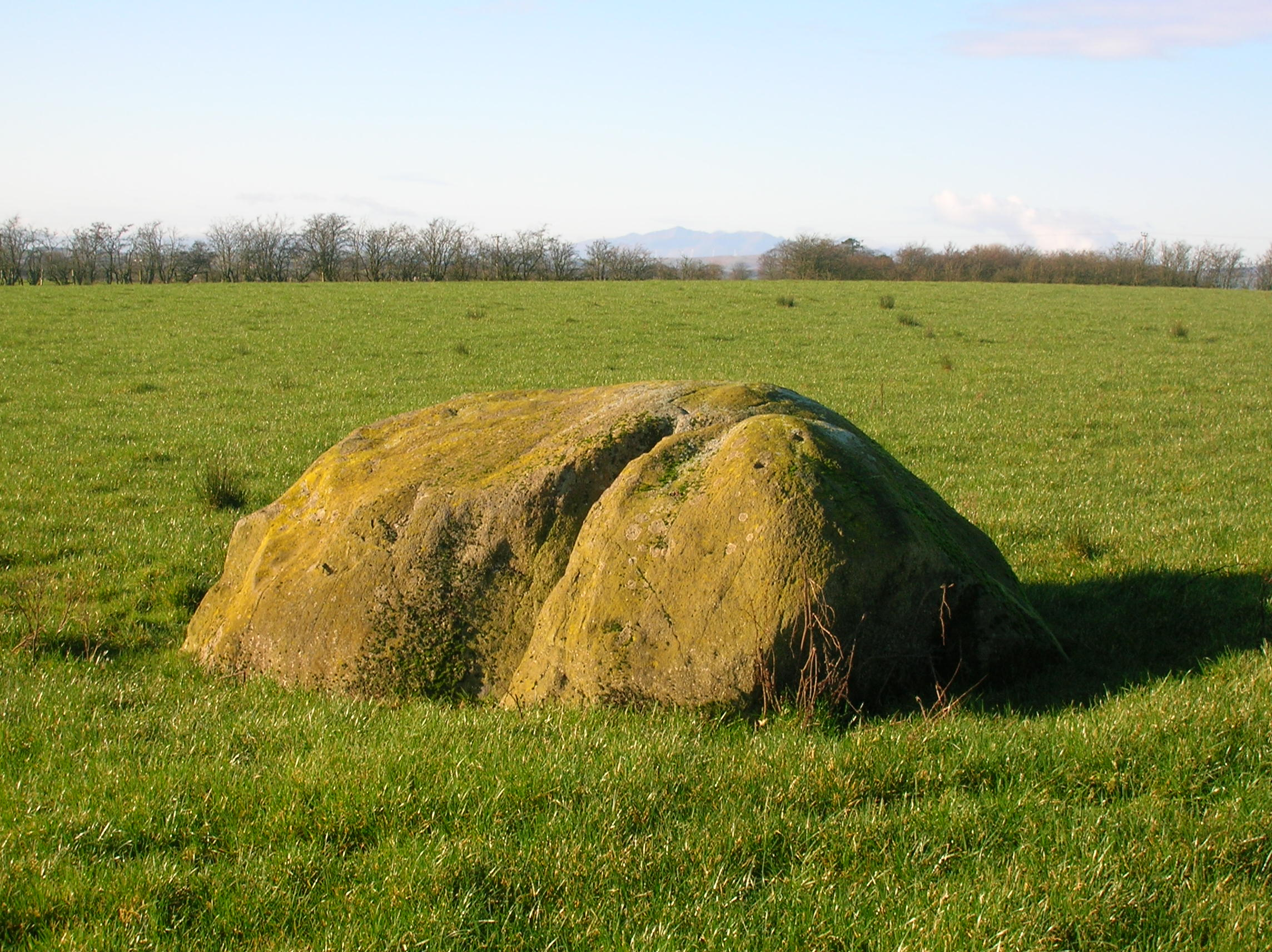
The Ogrestone or Thurgartstone is situated on the lands of Brandleside Farm near the Chapel Crags

The Thurgartstone or Ogrestone is a prominent glacial erratic stone near Dunlop in East Ayrshire, Scotland. The Thurgartstone stands in a field at Brandleside Farm and is thought to have been a rocking stone at one time, but it no longer moves due to a build up of soil beneath.

== Name ==
The Thurgartstane is also known as the Ogrestane, the Thorgatstane, the Fiend-Spirit's Stane, T'Ogra Stane, Thugart Stane, Fiend's Stane, Ogart Stane, Ogirtstane, the Ogre's Stone, Horgar Stane, Grit (great) stane or Thougritstane. In modern English, it is the Thurgartstone or Ogrestone.

One explanation of the name is that it derives from 'Thor's Great Stone'. Another is that the name comes from the phrase "Thou Great Stone" or just '"grit stane". The term 'The Stone of the Ogre' may indicate some forgotten legend. Some names may be spelling errors originating in or propagated by the Ordnance Survey or other maps. Another theory is that the name is derived from the word "Tagairtstane", which means "the priest's stone."

Yet another possibility is that 'Ogrestane' is more 'Ogre ton' and that the personal name 'Ogier' is a Normanised version of the Scandinavian name 'Holger'. Brandleside also may be a Scandinavian name and suggest that 'Brandale' was once the name of this valley.

It is said to have been used as a Druid's altar combined with possible cremation. The Chapel Crags is said to have been the location of the dwellings of these priests and their holy well with its curative properties was later Christianised as St Mary's Well by the monks.

== Location ==
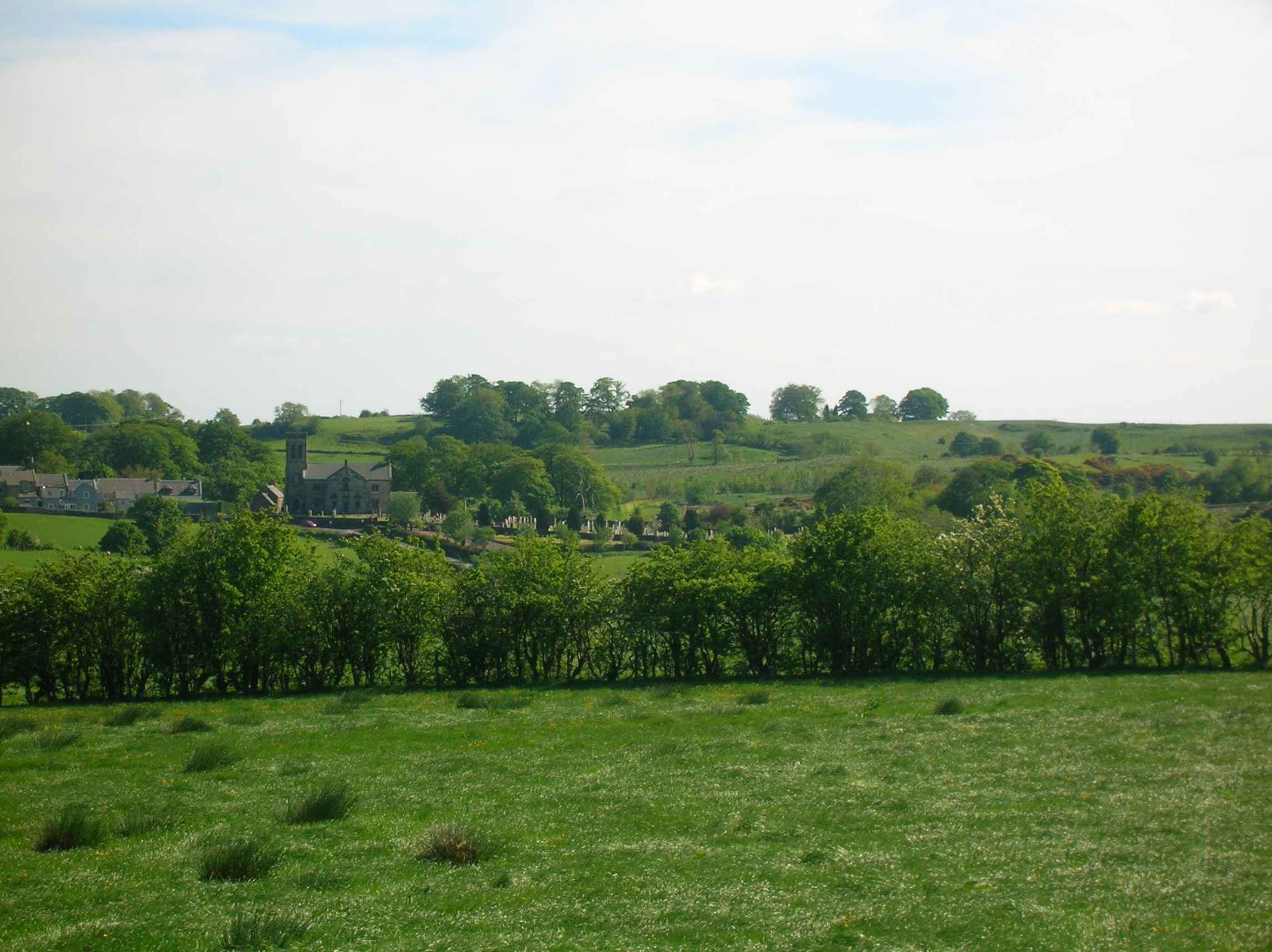
Dunlop kirk and village from the Thurgartstone

The Thurgartstone is close to Dunlop on the Lugton Road is Black Burn Valley. Situated prominently in the middle of a field close to Brandleside Farm near the Chapel Crags is the Thurgartstone. Dunlop or Boarland Hill, the site of Dunlop Castle once held by the De Ross family, can be seen from the stone. The stone is in a sheltered spot, with ample running water nearby. Its entire mass is somewhat hidden due to the soil level building up over the centuries.

== Description ==
The Thurgartston is a "glacial erratic stone". It is composed of blue augitic porphyrite. This rock is different from the 'native' stone of the area. The Thurgartston weighs about 25 tons and the part above ground is about twelve feet by eight feet. It is set near the site of the pre-Reformation St Mary's Chapel. The site is listed and protected by Historic Scotland.

== The religious settlement and Saint Mary's Well ==
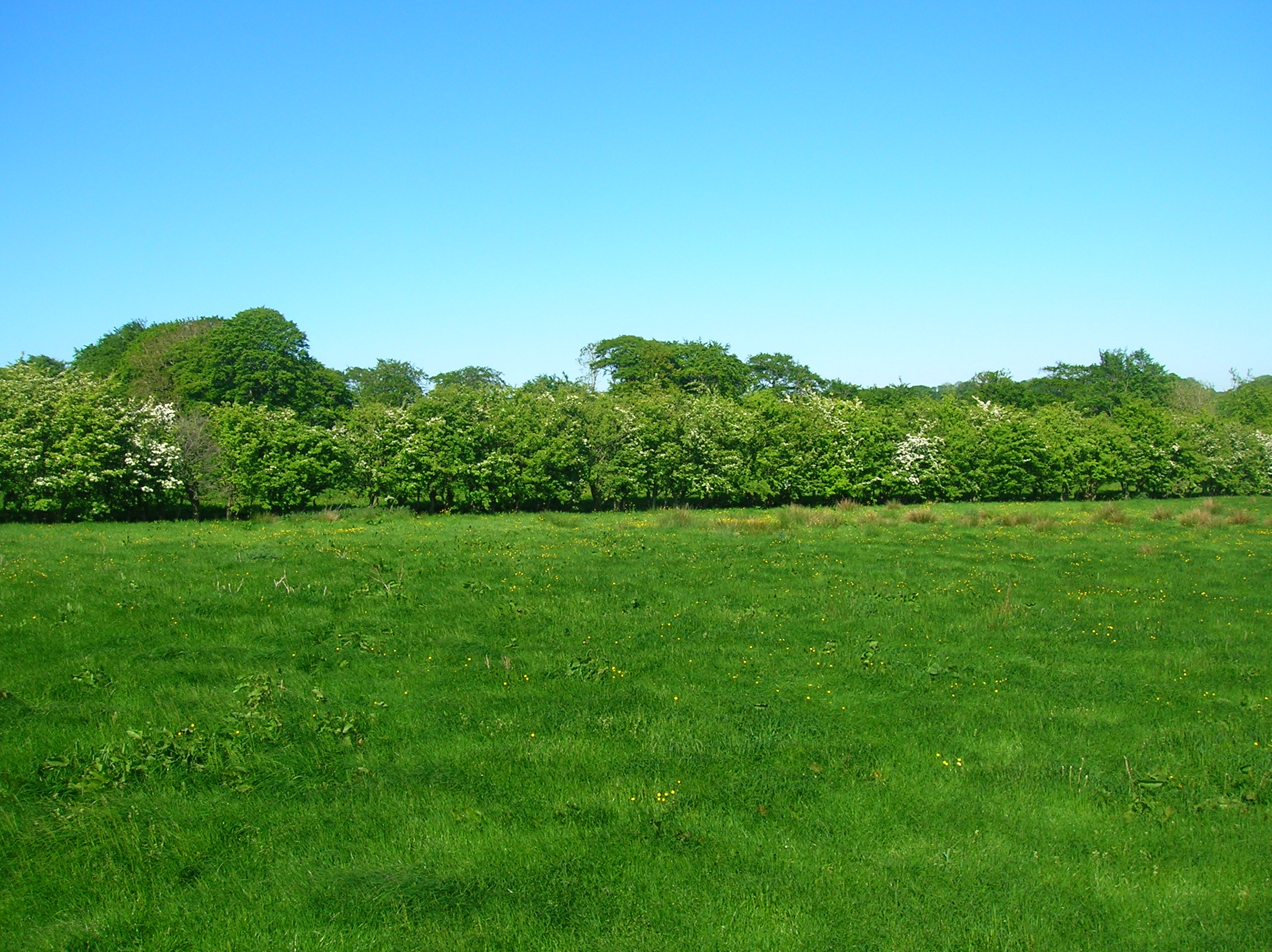
Looking towards the old Monks graveyard and Chapel Crags from the Thurgartstone.

There may have been a religious settlement associated with the 12th century chapel of Saint Mary near the Thurgartstone site. The chapel was built by the monks of Kilwinning Abbey and was endowed with sufficient funds to support a chaplain. It replaced an earlier church built to supplant the pagan influence of the Thurgartstone. The history of the site is apparently similar to the history of the Chapel Hill site at Chapeltoun.

There are steps cut into the rock that led up to the monk's cemetery. The chapel and graveyard are no longer visible, ruins of the chapel last being visible circa 1824 and removed in 1835. It stood on a rock by the Black Burn next to the 'Lady's Steps' now replaced by the road bridge.

There is a holy well in the "field bordered by the burn." The new buildings called "Marys Chapel" below the crags are built on the foundation of the original chapel. Chapelhouse Farm nearby was once called Brandlecraig. The well water arose from the base of the crags and when the road was built closer to the crags it was covered over but carried under it by a culvert that led to a trough surrounded by iron railings. Chapelhouse Farm and the St Mary's houses were once supplied with water from the well that had an ample and reliable flow. The water from the well was still used in 1972 for baptisms at Dunlop Church.

Some stone relics from St Mary's were given to a member of the Clement family and a christening font was discovered in the burn at Kirkwood Farm by another Clement. These artifacts are now kept at North Borland Farm.

== Associated Beliefs ==
The Thurgartstone has long been associated with pagan ritual practices. There are still May Day celebrations and events at the site. This 'Druidical' stone is thought by some to have been a 'rocking or logan' stone at one time. It is now firmly set in the 'rubbish' and dirt.

There are records showing that "even as late as the time of Popery", Catholics would do penance by crawling on their knees around this stone, crying "O thou grit stane". Apparently they held a belief that the Deity was present in the Thurgartstone.

Farmers from Brandleside Farm did not move or break up the stone as has happened so often elsewhere. They also kept their ploughs a set distance away from the Thurgartstone as stipulated in the farm lease. This was presumably because legend has it that there were pagan burials around this monument. The ancient Dunlop Carlin stone is on the other side of the village.

The well was said to be sacred to the Druids with magical properties ascribed to the water.

== Views of the Thurgarstone in 2007 ==
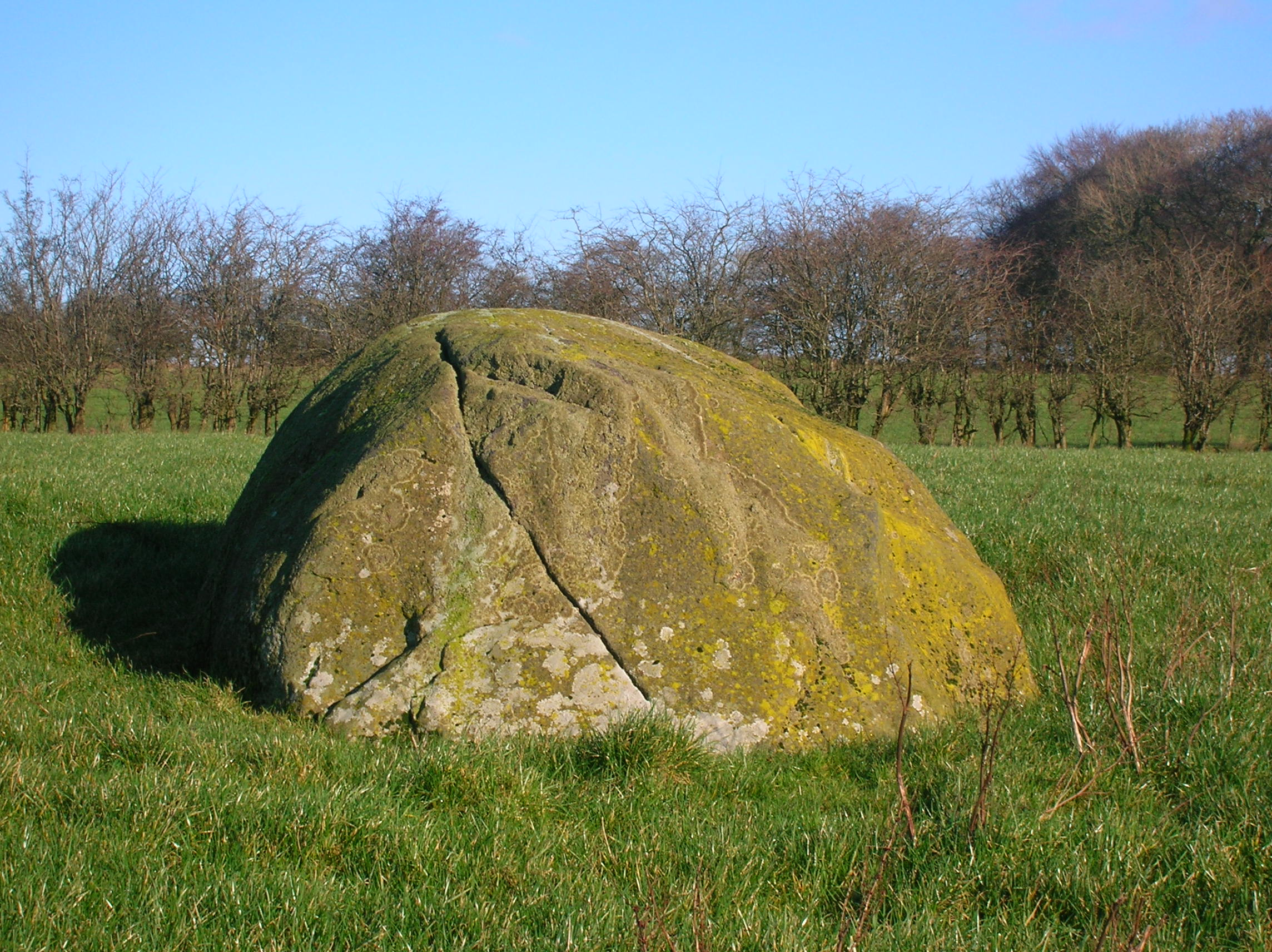
North Side.

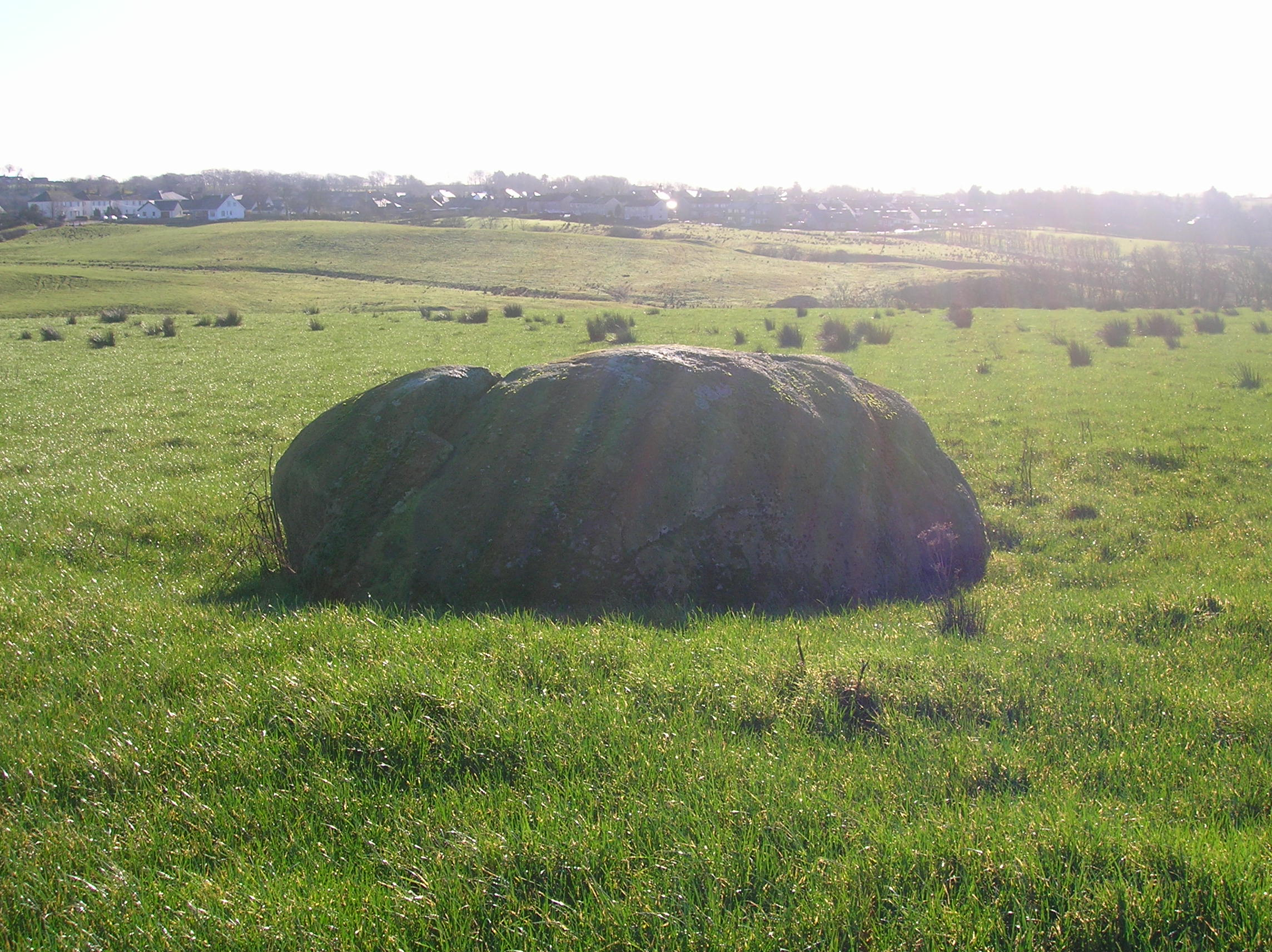
Dunlop Village in the background.

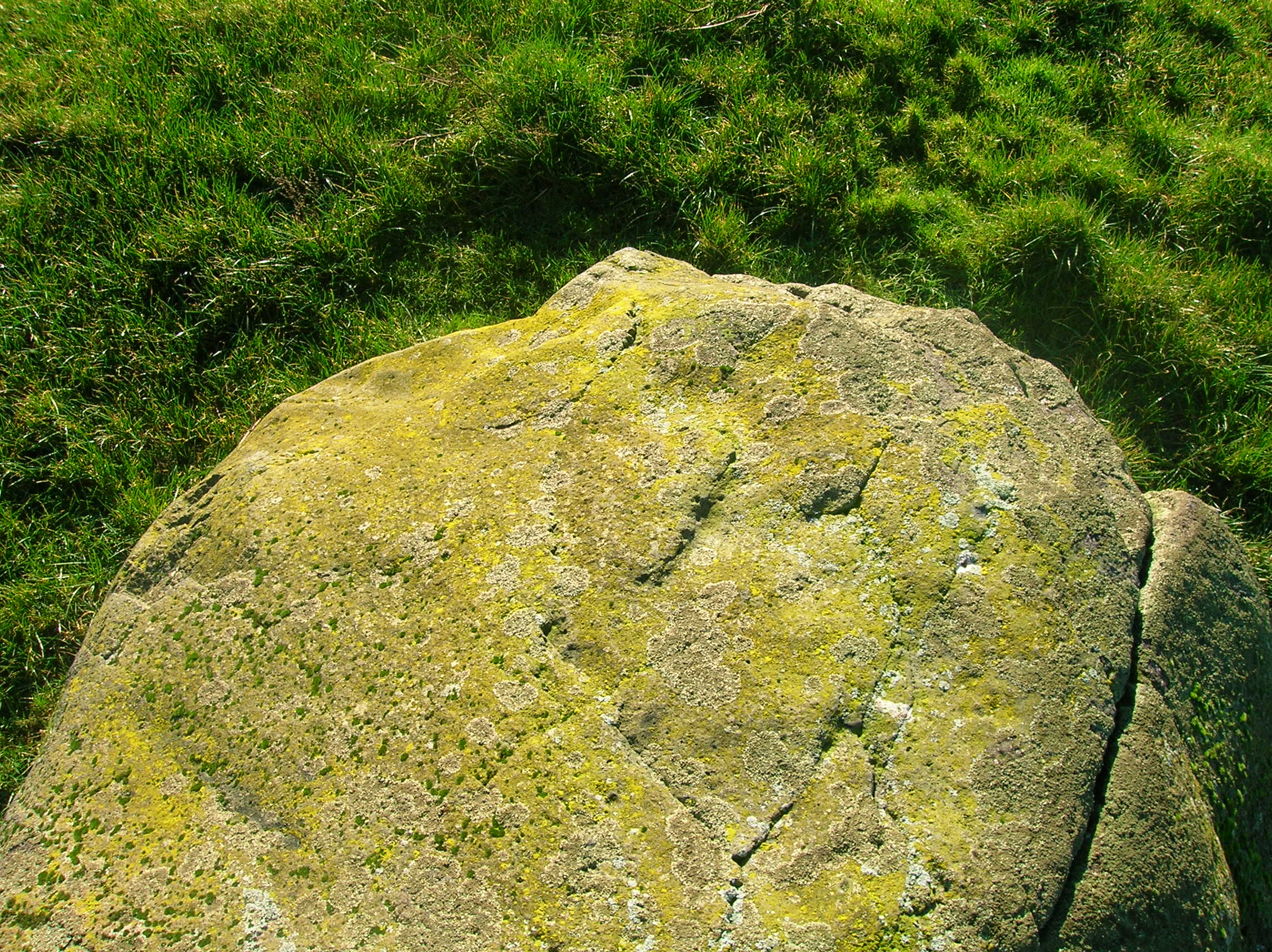
Viewed from above.

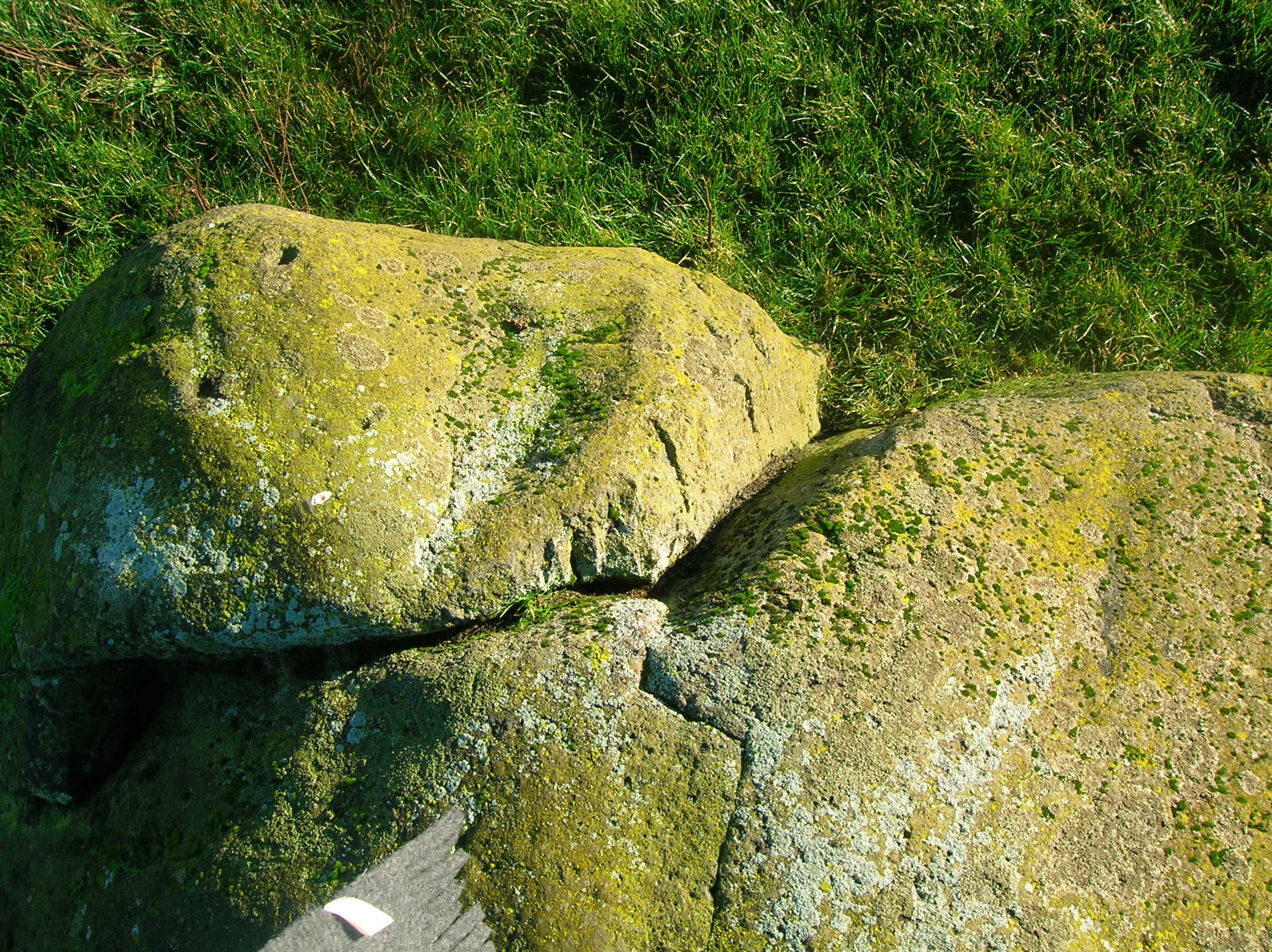
Viewed from above.

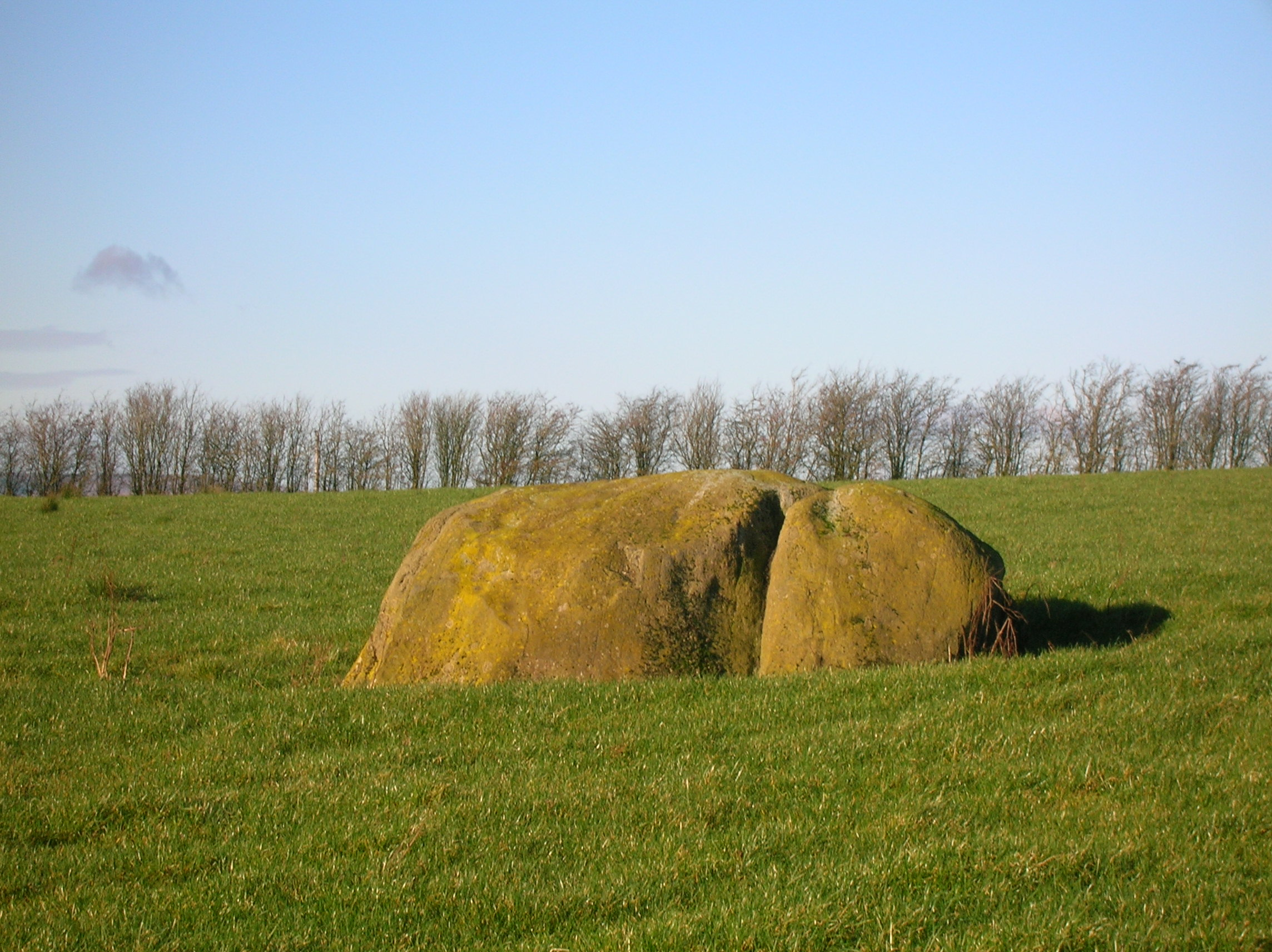

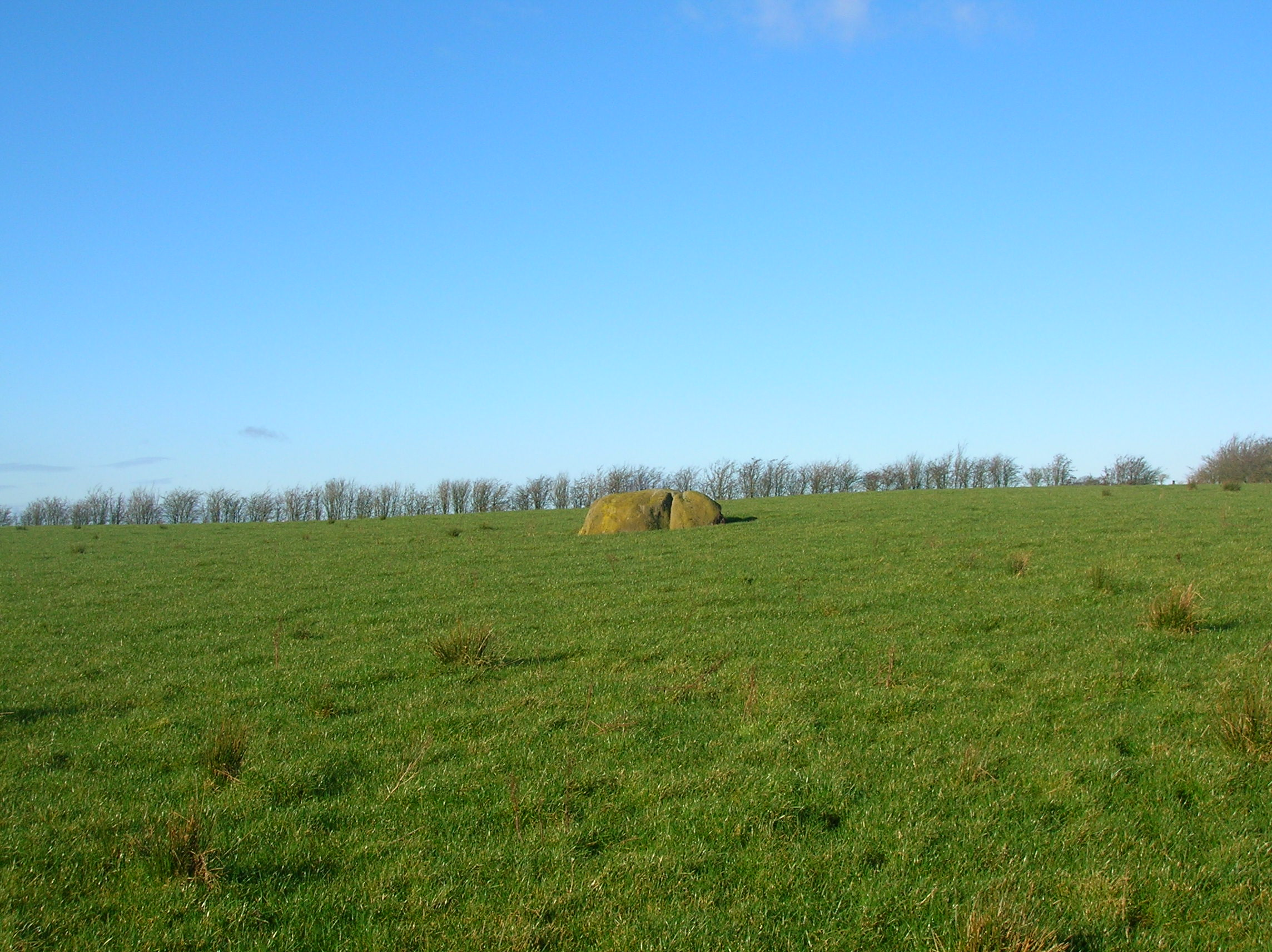
Viewed from the slope which runs down to the road.

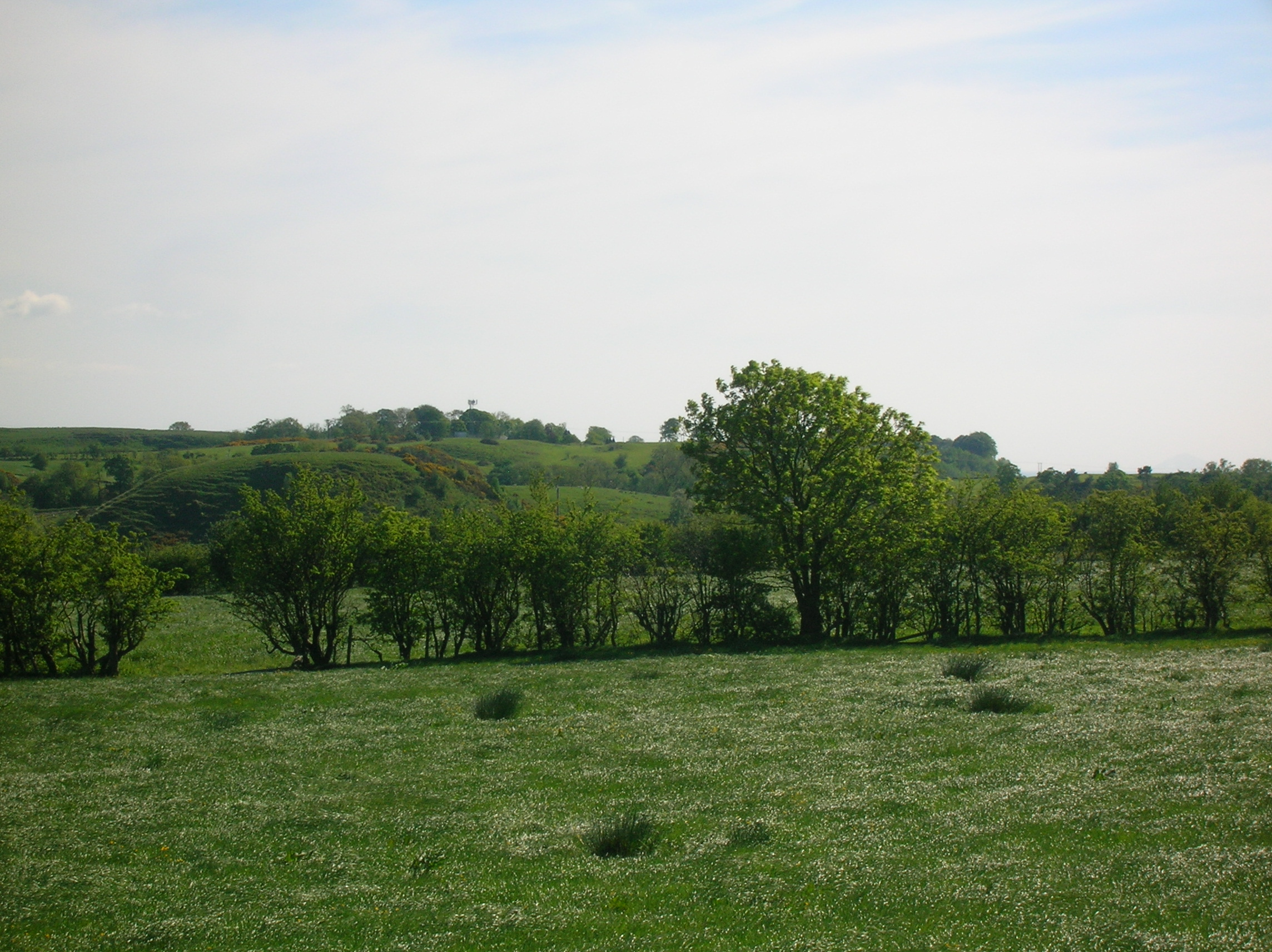
Dunlop Castle hill from the top of the stone.

== See also ==
- List of individual rocks
- Rocking Stones
- Corsehill, Lainshaw, Robertland and Dunlop
- Stones of Scotland
- Corsehill

== Sources ==
- Bayne, John F. (1935). Dunlop Parish - A History of Church, Parish, and Nobility. Edinburgh : T.& A. Constable.
- Clement, David (2012). Dunlop Diary. December issue.
- Hutchison, Jennifer L. (1972). History and the Economic Development of the Village of Dunlop. Privately published.
- Love, Dane (2009). Legendary Ayrshire. Custom : Folklore : Tradition. Auchinleck : Carn. ISBN 978-0-9518128-6-0
- Paterson, James (1866). History of the Counties of Ayr and Wigton. Edinburgh : James Stillie.
- Smith, John (1895). Prehistoric Man in Ayrshire. London : Elliot Stock.
