= Rocking stone =

Large precariously balanced stones

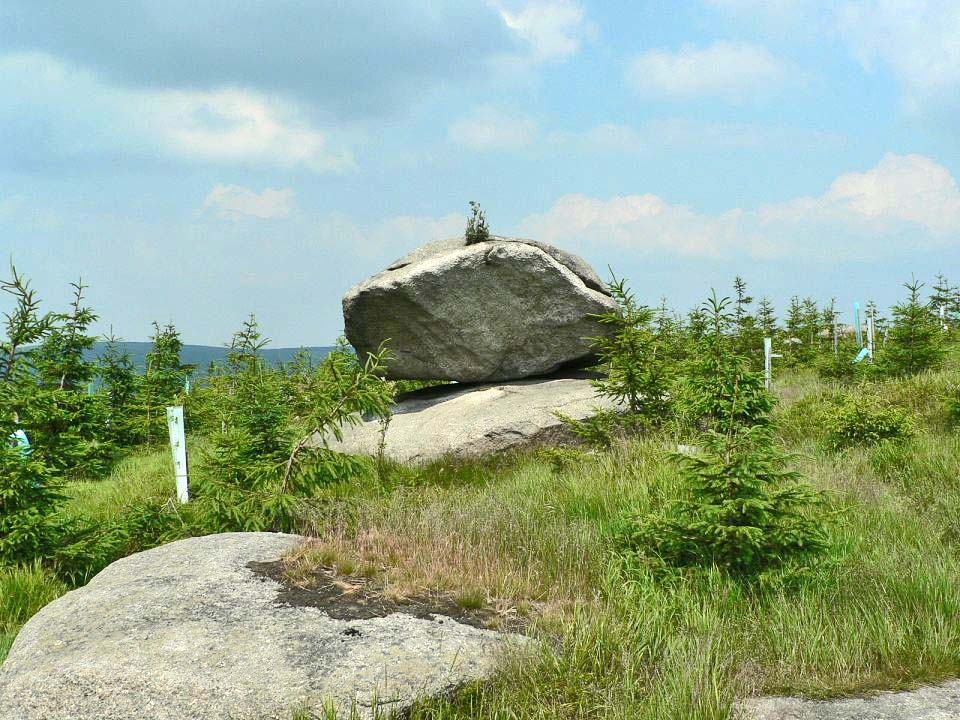
Rocking Stone Viklan, Jelení stráň, Jizera Mountains

Rocking stones (also known as logan stones or logans) are large stones that are so finely balanced that the application of just a small force causes them to rock. Typically, rocking stones are residual corestones formed initially by spheroidal weathering and have later been exposed by erosion or glacial erratics left by retreating glaciers. Natural rocking stones are found throughout the world. A few rocking stones might be man-made megaliths.

== Name ==
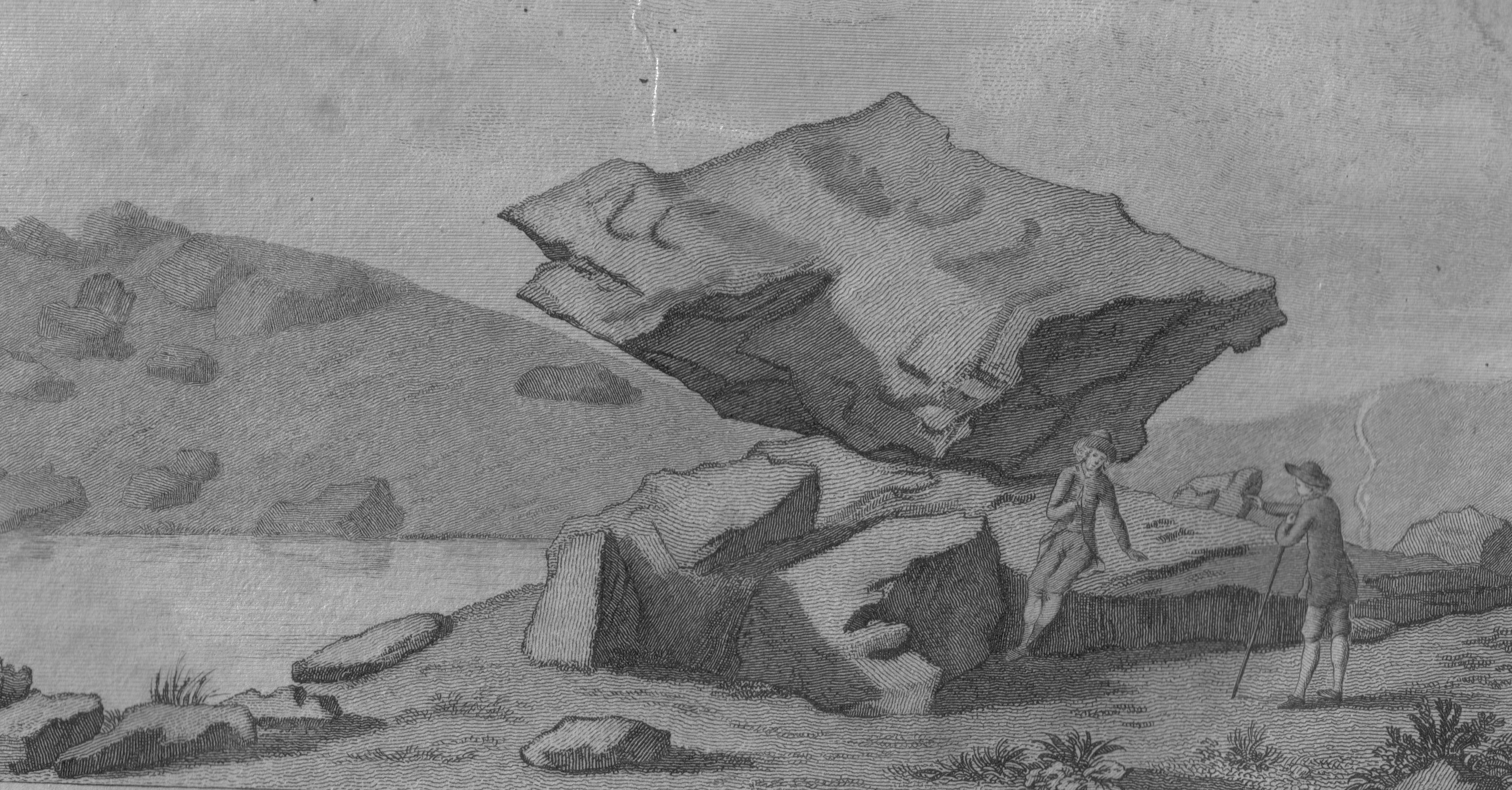
The Logan Stone on the Rhinns of Kells in Galloway in 1789

The word "logan" is probably derived from the word "log", which in the Cornish dialect of English means to rock. In some parts of the United Kingdom, rocking stones or logan stones are called logging stones. The word "log" might be connected with the Danish word logre, which means to 'wag a tail'.

Davies Gilbert suggested that the word "logan" comes from a Cornish expression for the movement that someone makes when inebriated:

"It may be observed that I have always used the words Loging Rock for the celebrated stone at Trereen Dinas. Much learned research seems to have been idly expended on the supposed name, "Logan Rock". To log is a verb in general use throughout Cornwall for vibrating or rolling like a drunken man, and is frequently heard in provincial pronunciation for tug, characteristic of the modem present participle. The Loging Rock is, therefore, strictly descriptive of its peculiar motion."

== Examples of rocking stones ==
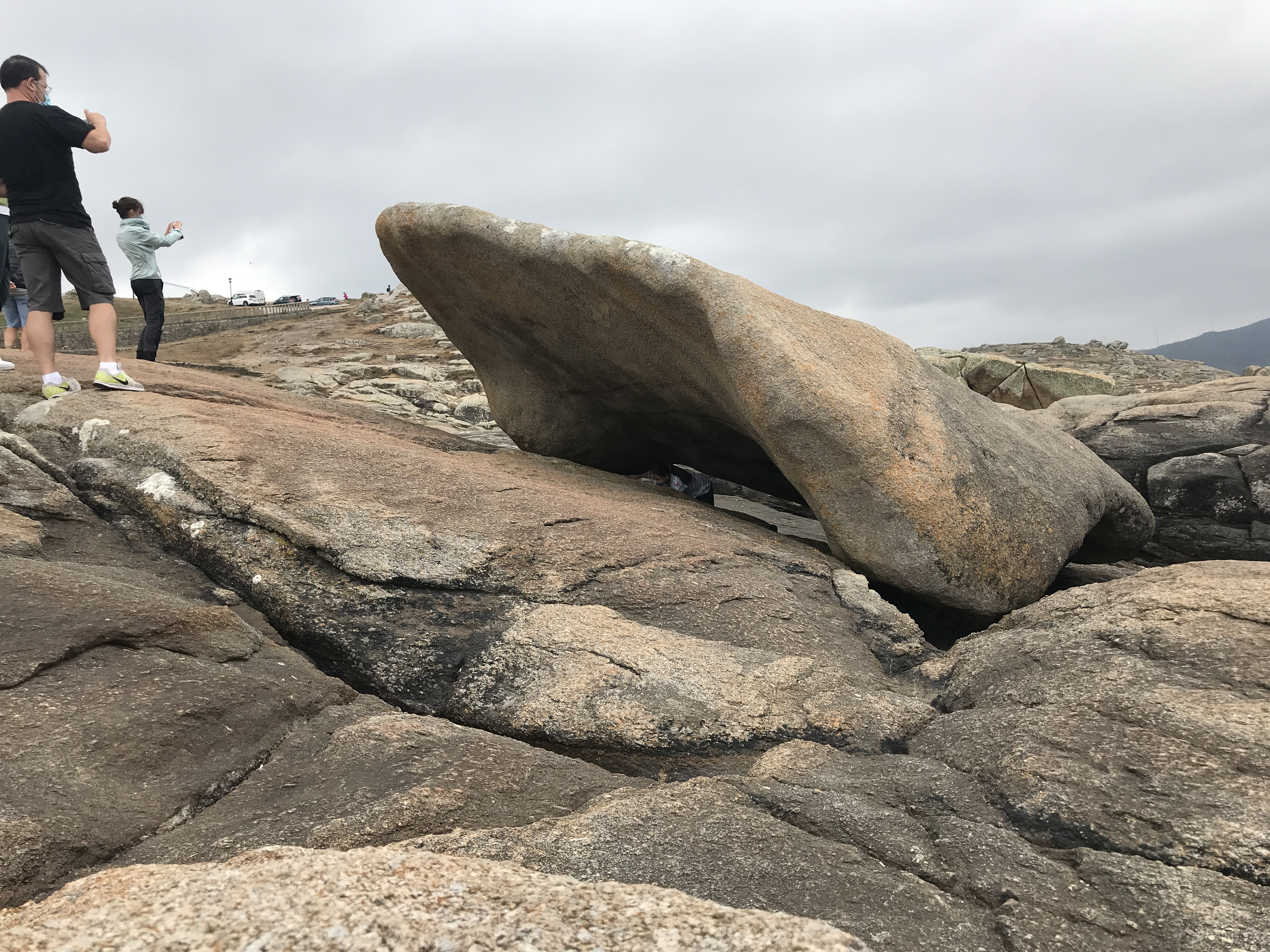
Pedra dos Cadris, a rocking stone in Muxía

Such stones are common in Britain and other places around the world. For example, in Galicia, rocking stones are called pedras de abalar; some examples of these are along the Costa da Morte, particularly around Muxía; they include the Pedras de Barca.

Pliny the Elder (23–79) wrote about a rock near Harpasa (in Caria, Asia Minor) "that can be moved with one finger, but that also resists a push made with the whole body." Ptolemy (circa 90–168) wrote about the Gygonian rock, which he wrote "can only be moved with an asphodel and remains immovable by force."

There are stones in Iona called na clachan-bràth, within the precincts of a burial ground, and placed on the pedestal of a cross, and have been according to Pennant, the supports of a tomb.

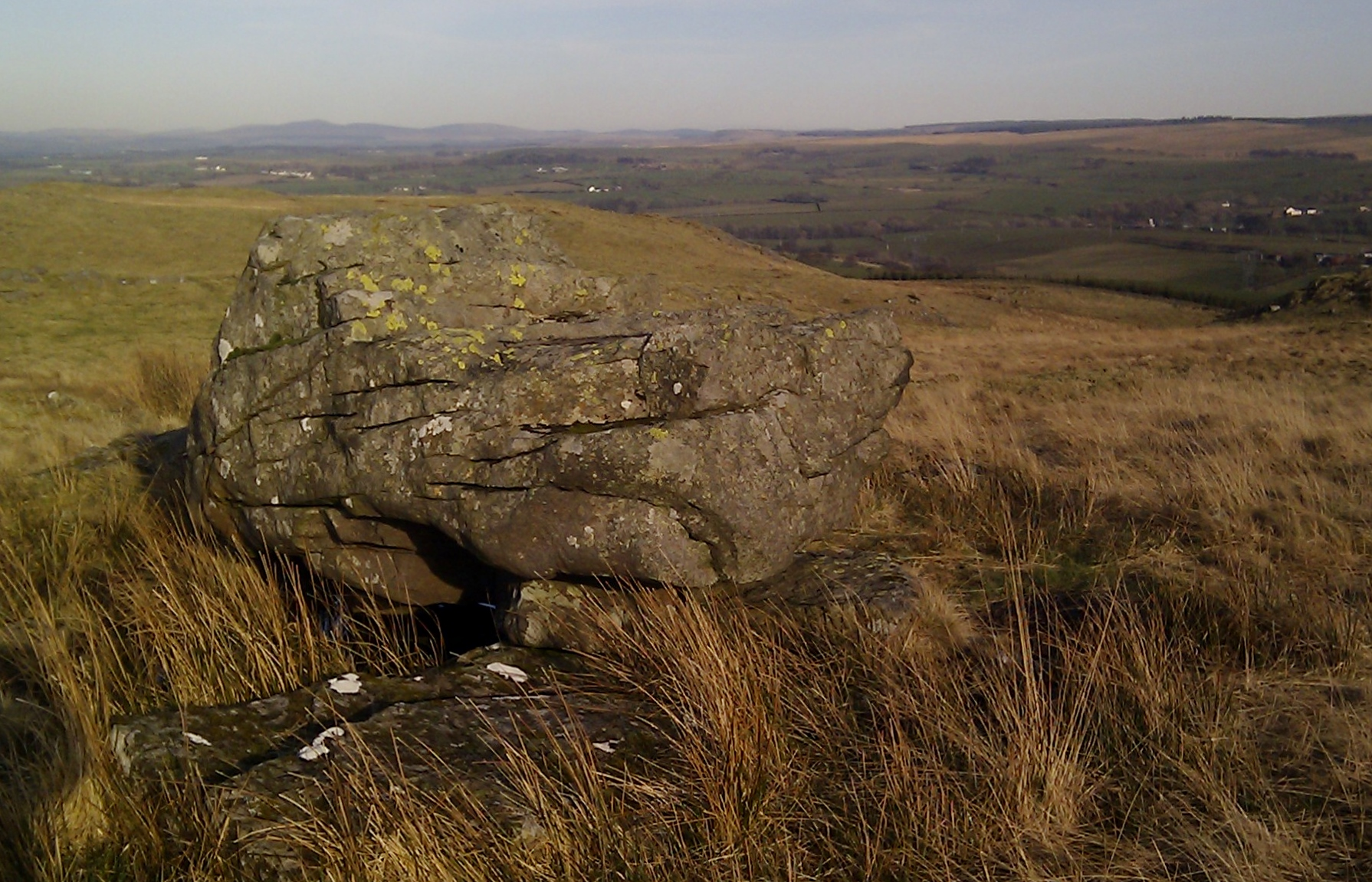
The Witch's Rocking Stone or Boarstone on the Craig o'Kyle in East Ayrshire

A massive 90 to 95 ton glacial erratic boulder near Halifax, Nova Scotia, can still be rocked with a lever, but used to move quite easily, before a band of sailors from the nearby Halifax garrison rocked it into a more stable configuration in the 1890s, and before its base was worn down by excessive rocking in the 1980s and '90s when a park was developed around it at Kidston Lake, in the Spryfield area of the municipality. It used to be a popular picnic destination; in Victorian times, people would travel from Halifax, climb upon it and spread their lunches, while enjoying the sensation of rocking gently while seated upon the huge rock.

The Pontypridd Rocking Stone in Wales is set within the middle of a Druidic stone circle.

Bosistow Logan Rock is at the head of Pendower Cove (sometimes written as Pendour Cove) near Zennor, Cornwall. It apparently was discovered by an employee of the lord of the local manor whose duty it was to watch the coast. A ship had been wrecked in the cove, and while watching ensuing activity, the employee leaned against a boulder. Suddenly, a gust of wind occurred, and the boulder shifted, or "logged". The longest side of this mass of stone is about 15 feet (4.6 m), and the circumference of its biggest end is about 20 feet (6.1 m). It is thought to weigh about 20 tons.

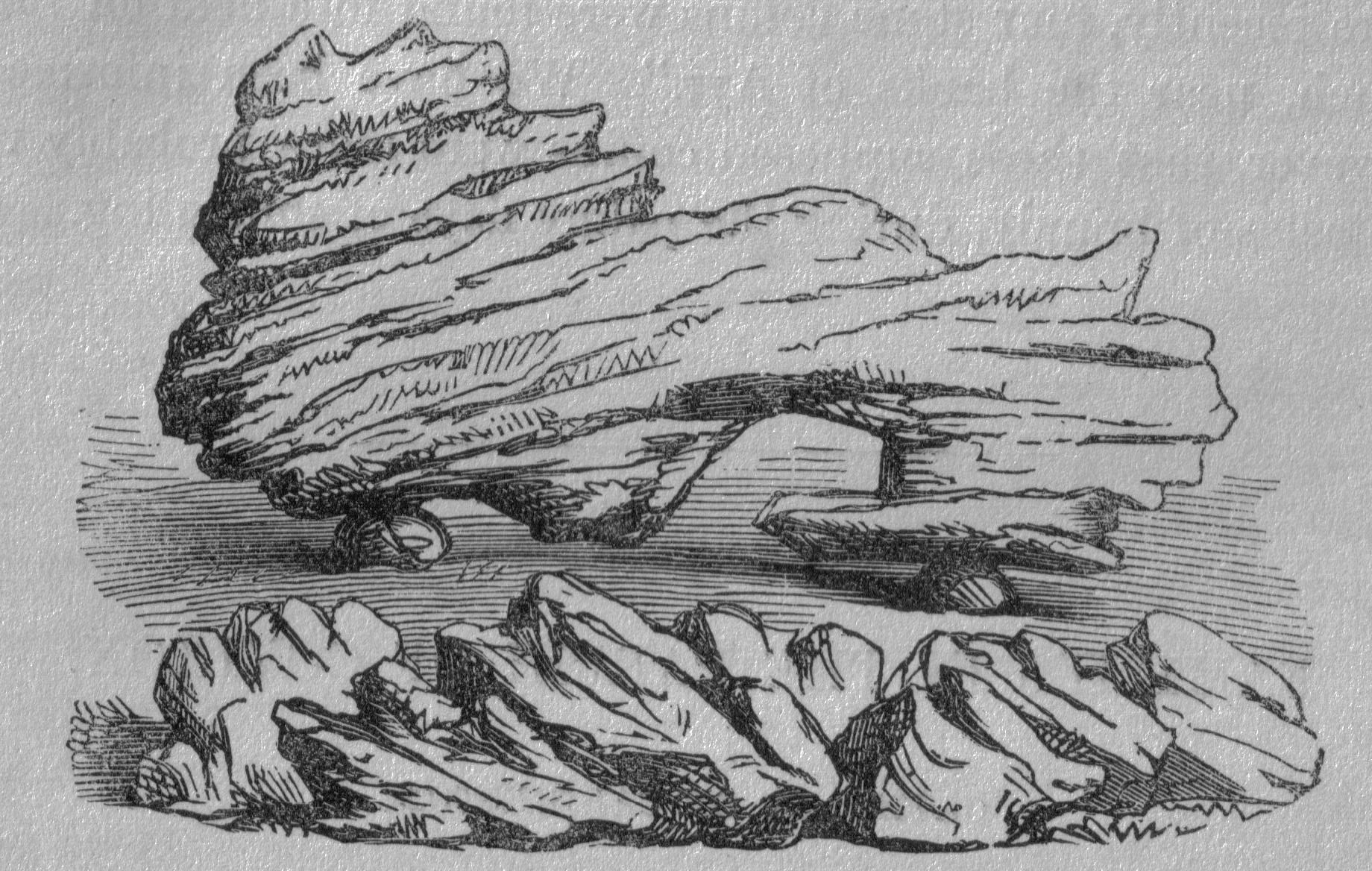
The Coylton or Witch's rocking stone in 1863

A rocking stone is recorded near the site of Saint Bride's Chapel. The Witch's or Boarstone stands on top of the Craigs of Kyle near Coylton in Ayrshire. It weighs around 30 tons and rests upon two or three stones. A large standing stone known as Wallace's stone is recorded to have stood nearby.

A rocking stone is found near Loch Riecawr in South Ayrshire.

In the parish of North Carrick in the Straiton District in South Ayrshire, about a quarter of a mile to the west of the White Laise, and near the March Dyke, a rocking stone named the Logan Stone exists. The Logan Stone is a grey granite rock and rests on greywacke, and can easily be moved with one hand. It is 4 feet 3 inches (1.30 m) by 4 feet (1.2 m), by 3 feet (0.91 m) high.

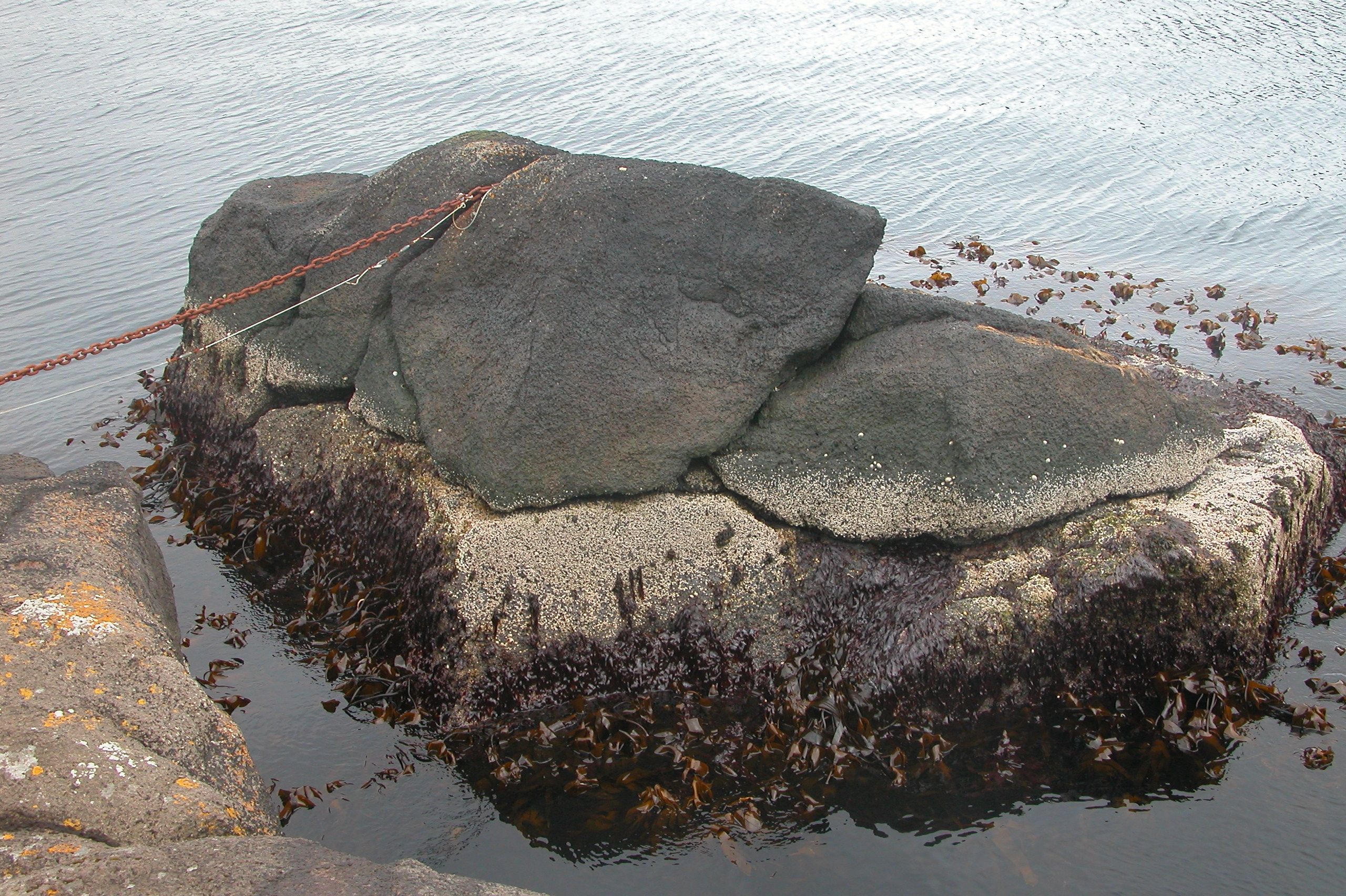
Rinkusteinar in Oyndarfjørður, Eysturoy, Faroe Islands. The chain is connected to the mainland to make it easier to see the rock's movements.

There is a famous pair of rocking stones on the Faroese island of Eysturoy in the village of Oyndarfjørður. These are known as the Rinkusteinar. Local legend states that an old sorceress cursed two pirate ships that were menacing the village, turning them to stone. A chain connected to the mainland makes it easier to see the rock's movements.

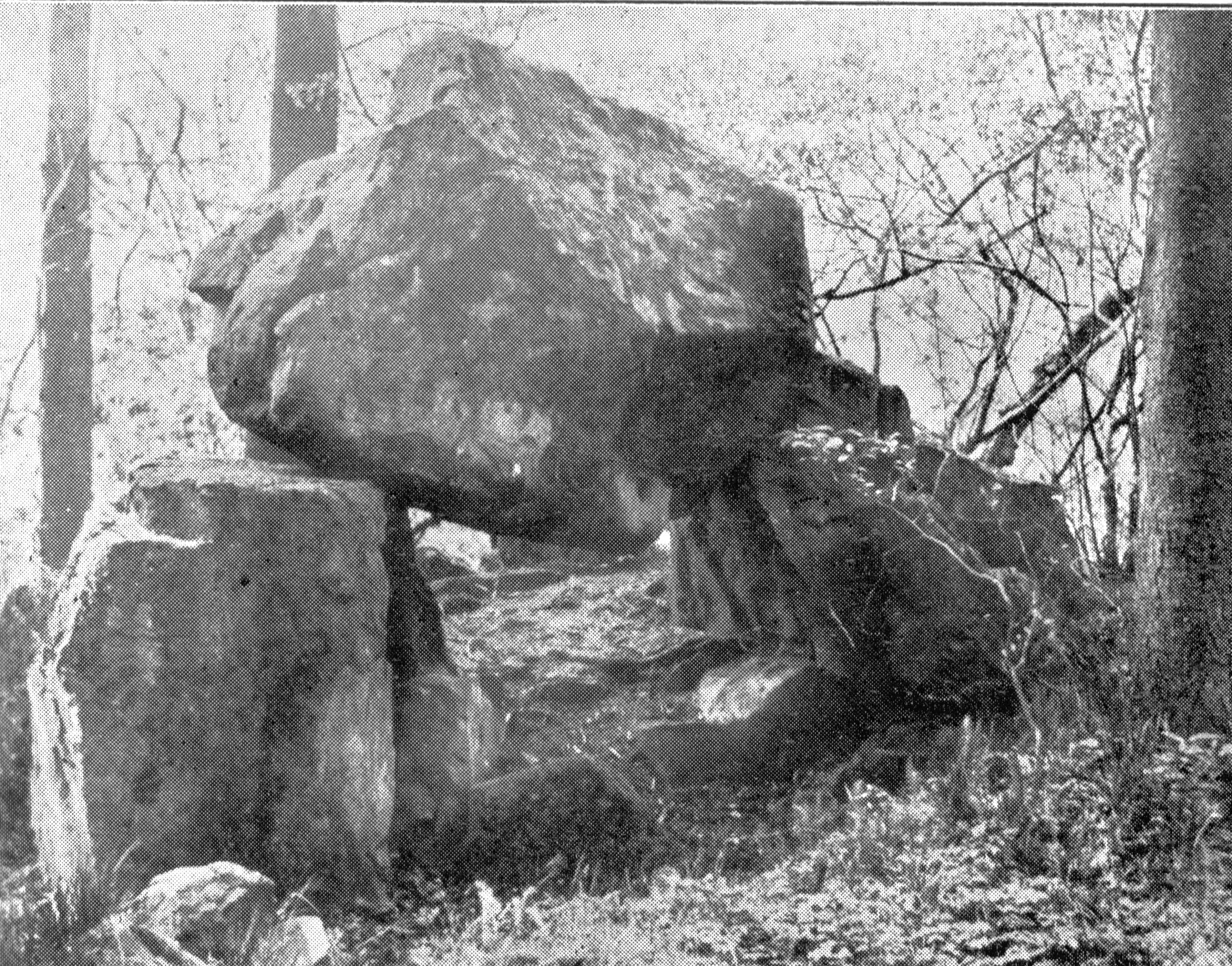
The Lugar rocking stone

Near Lugar in the Parish of Auchinleck in Ayrshire, Scotland, is the Lamargle or Lamargee rocking stone in a hollow by the Bello or Bellow Water near its junction with the Glenmore Water from which point the name Lugar Water is applied. It is made of two vertical stones, and a horizontal stone about 6 ft long, 3 ft broad, and 4 ft high. It was regarded as a Druidic monument or the grave of a Caledonian hero. This stone has often been overlooked, as the OS maps give the wrong location; it sits beside the Bellow Water above its confluence with the Glenmore Water and not on Lamargle Hill.

The Kyaiktiyo Pagoda in Burma is a religious shrine built on top of a huge granite boulder that is also a rocking stone.

Some masses shaped by humans also exhibit similar behaviour (sometimes unintentionally). For example, in the ruins of the Roman temples at Jerash in Jordan (the "city of 1000 pillars"), some massive pillars move back and forth in the slightest breeze.

== Stones that used to move ==
A stone used to rock on a gritstone outcrop on Warley Moor near Halifax in West Yorkshire. It had already ceased to rock when described by John Watson in 1775.

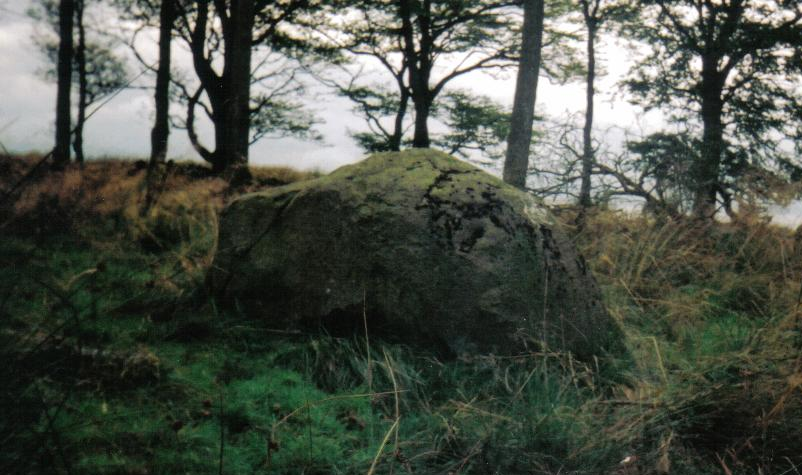
The Rocking Stone at Cuff Hill in Ayrshire

Ayrshire in Southwest Scotland apparently is endowed with a geology that lends itself towards the formation of rocking stones. Several rocking stones, or stones that used to rock at one time, are there.

A rocking stone that some associate with the Druids is on Cuff Hill in Hessilhead, near Beith in North Ayrshire. It no longer rocks due to people digging beneath to ascertain its fulcrum. It is in a small wood and surrounded by a circular drystone wall. An article was published in the Cumnock Chronicle in 1907 on the reason for the stone being dislodged.

The Ogrestone or Thurgartstone near Dunlop in East Ayrshire is thought to have been a rocking stone. However, soil has built up around the base of the Thurgatstone over the years, which now prevents any rocking motion.

A rocking stone existed in 1913–1919 at Sannox on Arran, on a nearly horizontal platform next to the seashore.

The Lamagee or Lamargle stone in Lugar as previously mentioned is in the center of a loose collection of stones in the village of Lugar in East Ayrshire. The Lamargle stone rests on two stones. Local legend has it that the Lamargle stone used to rock, but it no longer does. The Witch's Stone or Boarstone on the Craigs o'Kyle is recorded by the author John Smith as having rocked.

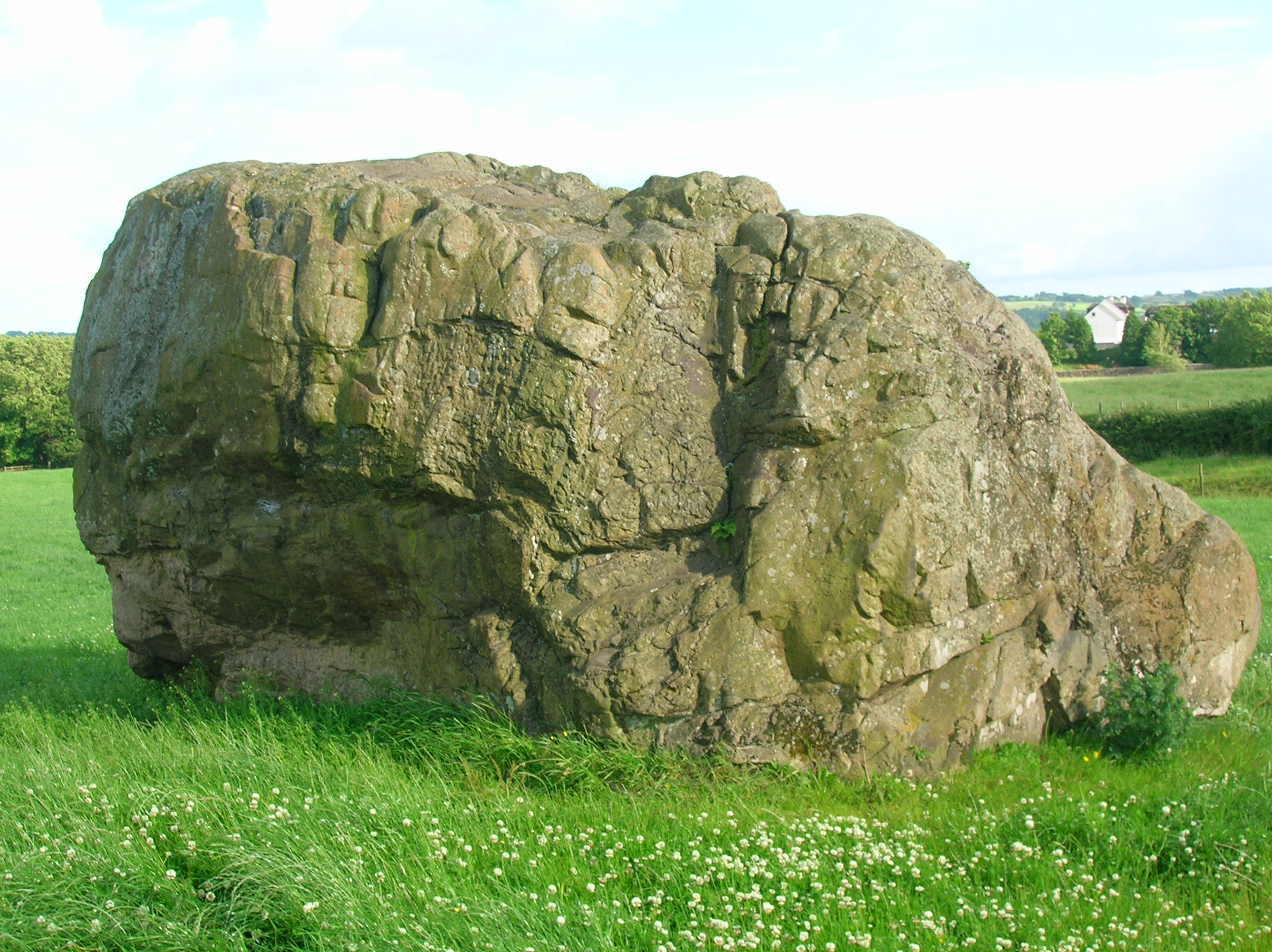
The Clochoderick Rocking Stone

The Clochoderick Stone near Howwood and Kilbarchan in Renfrewshire used to rock, and it is said that the Druids used it to judge people. The accused was made to sit on the stone and by the way it moved, the Druids judged the innocence or guilt of the individual. It is also said to be the burial place of Rhydderch Hael, King of Strathclyde, who was the victor at the Battle of Arderydd near Arthuret in the Borders. His victory brought Christianity to Strathclyde. This stone is very unusual and is a SSSI for Geology in its own right.

== Dislodged rocking stones ==
Often wear, erosion, or human intervention has resulted in the dislodging of rocking stones.

=== Devon ===
A well-known rocking stone or logan stone was located at Sharpitor near Lustleigh on Dartmoor. It was also called the Nutcrackers Stone, sometimes seen on Ordnance Survey maps. The huge stone once lay overhanging Lustleigh Cleave until 1951, when it was deliberately pushed down the valley. A failed attempt to rescue the stone by pulling it back up the valley resulted in it breaking into pieces.

Around 1900 there were rocking stones at Rippon tor, and Sittaford tor on Dartmoor.

=== Larchmont, New York ===
A 150-ton glacial erratic occurs on Rockingstone Avenue in Larchmont, New York, that was so perfectly balanced that just a small touch would allow it to rock back and forth. In the 1920s, blasting for a new sewer system in the neighbourhood dislodged the rock, and it no longer balances.

=== Pembrokeshire ===
A rocking stone in Pembrokeshire is described in Gibson's edition of Camden's Britannia, from a manuscript account by George Owen:

"This shaking stone may be seen on a sea-cliff within half a mile of St. David's. It is so vast that I presume it may exceed the draught of an hundred oxen, and it is altogether rude and unpolished. The occasion of the name (Y maen sigl, or the Rocking-stone) is for that being mounted upon divers other stones about a yard in height it is so equally poised that a man may shake it with one finger so that five or six men sitting on it shall perceive themselves moved thereby."

Cromwell's soldiers rendered the rocking stone of Pembrokeshire immovable after Mr. Owen had described it. They reportedly destroyed it because they felt it encouraged superstition.

=== Golcar Hill ===
Another rocking stone was at Golcar Hill, near Halifax in Yorkshire. However, the Golcar Hill rocking stone will no longer easily rock because some masons wanted to find out how such a large weight could move so easily, so they chopped at it until they destroyed its balance.

=== Men Amber ===
A very sensitive rocking stone called Men Amber (sometimes written as Men-Amber or Menamber, from the Cornish men omborth meaning balance stone) was on a high ridge in the parish of Sithney, near Helston, Cornwall. It is 11 feet (3.4 m) long, 4 feet (1.2 m) deep, and 6 feet (1.8 m) wide. It was toppled by Shrubsall, the governor of Pendennis, and his men about 1650 during Cromwell's Commonwealth. One rumoured motivation for the dislodging was a purported prophecy of Merlin, who supposedly said that Men Amber would stand until England had no king.

Rev. Dr. William Stukeley wrote:

Main Ambres; petrae ambrosiae, signify the stones anointed with holy oil, consecrated; or in a general sense, a temple, altar or places or worship

William Borlase in his 1754 book Antiquities of Cornwall, claimed that Men Amber was dislodged because:

the vulgar used to resort to this place at particular times of the year, and paid to this rock more respect than was thought becoming to good Christians.

=== Logan Rock ===
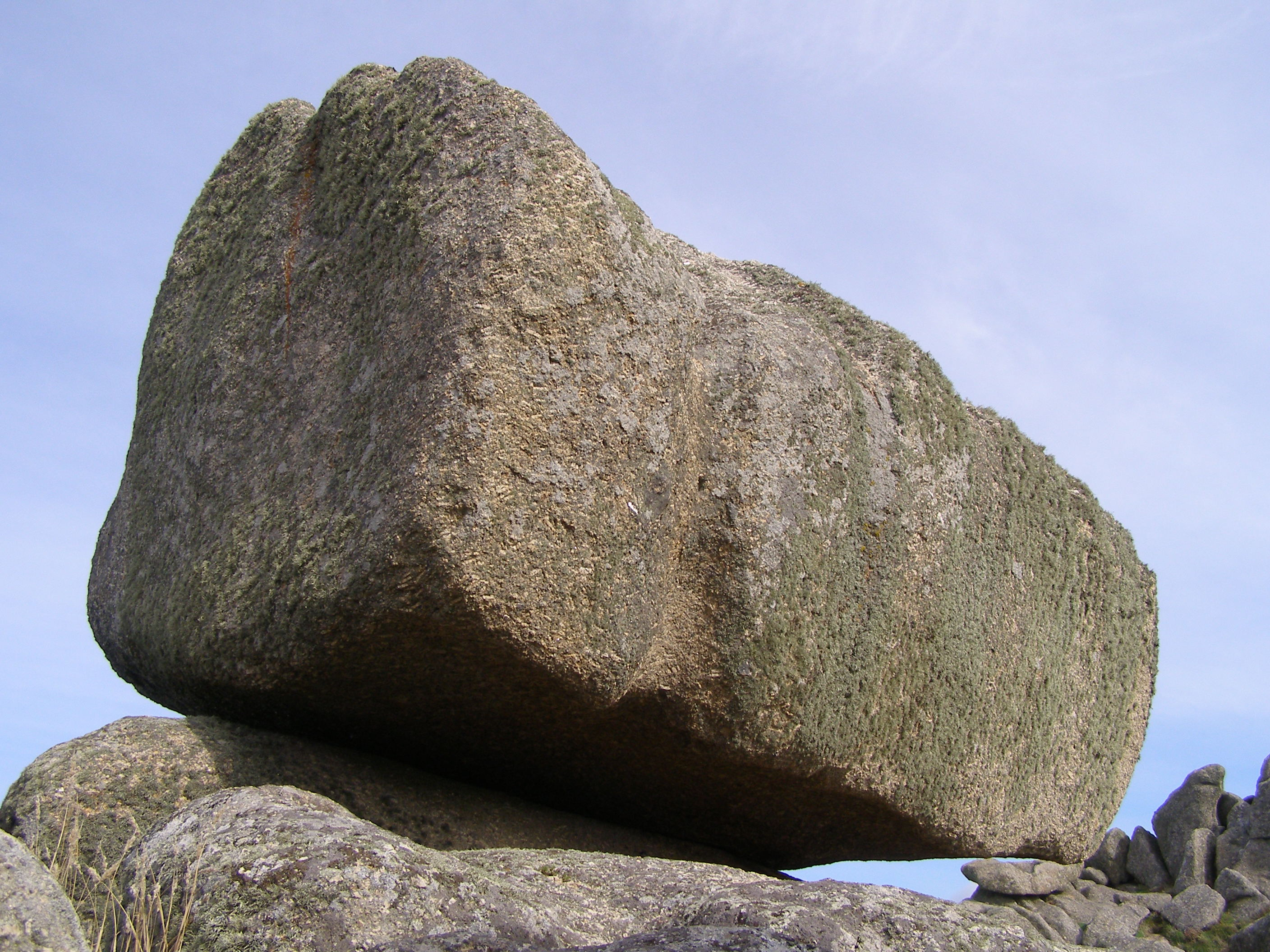
The Logan Rock at Trereen Dinas

Another well-known example of a rocking or logan stone is Logan Rock of Treen in Cornwall. This huge stone weighs about 80 or 90 tons. It is one of the best-known rocking stones for several reasons. For example, Modred, in William Mason's dramatic poem "Caractacus" addressing the characters Vellinus and Elidurus, says of the Logan Rock:

Thither, youths,
Turn your astonish'd eyes; behold yon huge
And unhewn sphere of living adamant,
Which, poised by magic, rests its central weight
On yonder pointed rock: firm as it seems,
Such is the strange and virtuous property,
It moves obsequious to the gentlest touch
Of him whose breast is pure; but to a traitor,
Tho' ev’n a giant’s prowess nerv’d his arm,
It stands as fixt as Snowdon.

However, another reason that the Logan Rock of Treen is remembered is that it was the center of a famous drama. In April 1824, Lieutenant Hugh Goldsmith, R. N. (nephew of the famous poet Oliver Goldsmith), and 10 or 12 of his crew of the cutter HMS Nimble, armed with bars and levers, rocked the huge granite boulder until it fell from its cliff-top perch. Goldsmith was apparently motivated to disprove the claim of Dr. Borlase, who wrote in Antiquities of Cornwall in 1754 that:

In the parish of S. Levan, there is a promontory called Castle Treryn. This cape consists of three distinct groups of rocks. On the western side of the middle group near the top, lies a very large stone, so evenly, poised that any hand may move it to and fro; but the extremities of its base are at such a distance from each other, and so well secured by their nearness to the stone which it stretches itself upon, that it is morally impossible that any lever, or indeed force, however applied in a mechanical way, can remove it from its present situation.

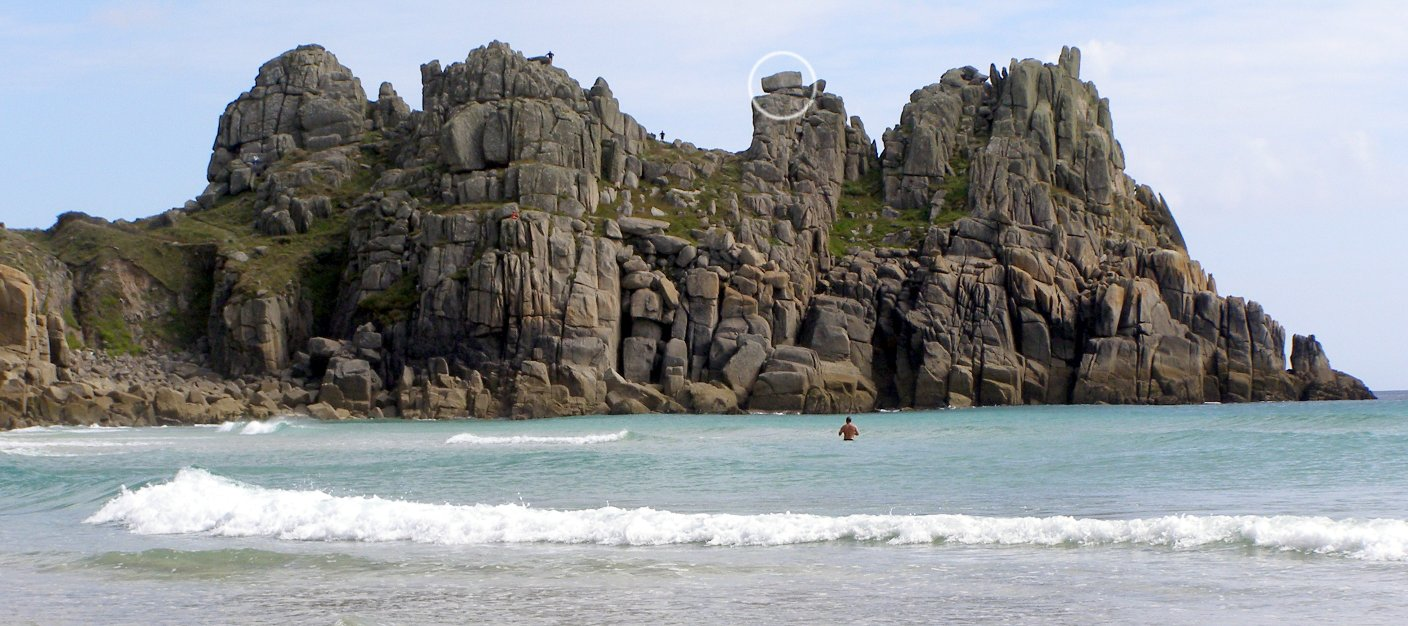
The Logan Rock (circled) seen from Pednvounder beach

Goldsmith was determined to demonstrate that nothing was impossible when the courage and skill of British seamen were engaged. The Logan Rock fell and was caught in a narrow chasm.

This upset the local residents considerably, since Logan Rock had been used to draw tourists to the area. Sir Richard Vyvyan (1800–1879) was particularly unhappy. They demanded that the British Admiralty strip Lieutenant Goldsmith of his Royal Navy commission unless he restored the boulder to its previous position at his own expense. However, Mr. Davies Gilbert persuaded the Lords of the Admiralty to lend Lieutenant Goldsmith the required apparatus for replacing the Logan Rock. The Admiralty sent 13 capstans with blocks and chains from the dock yard at Plymouth, and contributed £25 towards expenses. Gilbert also raised more funds.

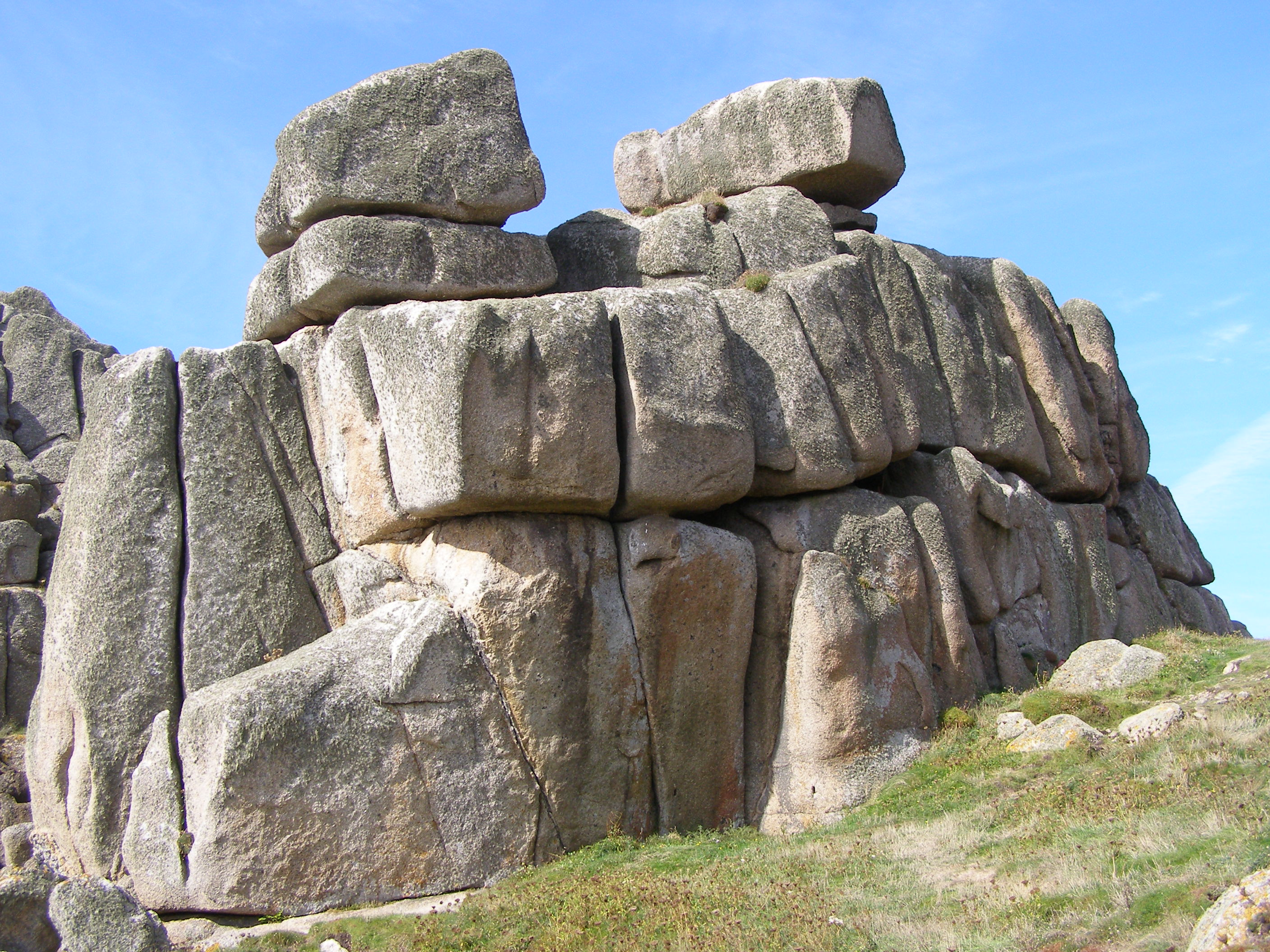
The Logan Rock (top right) in context

After months of effort, at 4:20 pm on 2 November 1824, in front of thousands of spectators and with the help of more than 60 men and block and tackle, the Logan Rock was finally repositioned and returned to "rocking condition". Apparently, the total final cost of this enterprise was £130 8s 6d. However, it is not clear how much of the remaining £105 Goldsmith had to make up out of his own pocket.

For some time after, the rock was kept chained and padlocked, but eventually these restrictions were removed, and the rock was set free. However, it apparently no longer vibrates or "logs" as easily as it did before.

Tourism dropped, and this was blamed on the condition of Logan Rock. For a while, Treen was nicknamed 'Goldsmith's Deserted Village'.

Another famous rock structure, Lanyon Cromlech, was knocked down during a thunderstorm in 1815. The same machinery that was used to restore the Logan Rock in Treen was successful in repositioning Lanyon Cromlech.

== Beliefs ==
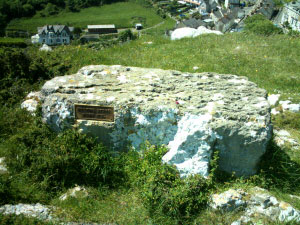
Rocking Stone 'Maen Sigl' Great Orme Llandudno

A wide variety of beliefs are associated with rocking stones. Because of their strange nature, rocking stones were sometimes associated with witchcraft, or Druids.

The rocking stone near Nancledrea in Cornwall was said to only move at midnight when witches were out. People claimed that if one touched the rocking stone nine times at midnight, one would turn into a witch.

The Brimham rocking stone in Yorkshire is said to rock only for the efforts of an honest man.

The rocking stone at Land's End was said to have been placed there by a giant who used it to rock himself to sleep.

It was claimed that the Logan Stone in Treen could cure childhood diseases. The children were rocked on the Logan Stone in certain seasons. People say that the charm was broken when Lieutenant Goldsmith dislodged the Logan Stone.

It is a Cornish tradition to make a vow and then attempt to move a rocking stone, or logan rock. It was said that no persons with treachery in their hearts could make a rocking stone move.

== See also ==
- List of individual rocks
- Balancing rock
- Ice rafted debris
- Pedras de abalar
- Stones of Scotland
- Sailing stones
