= Eglinton Tournament Bridge =

Bridge in North Ayrshire, Scotland

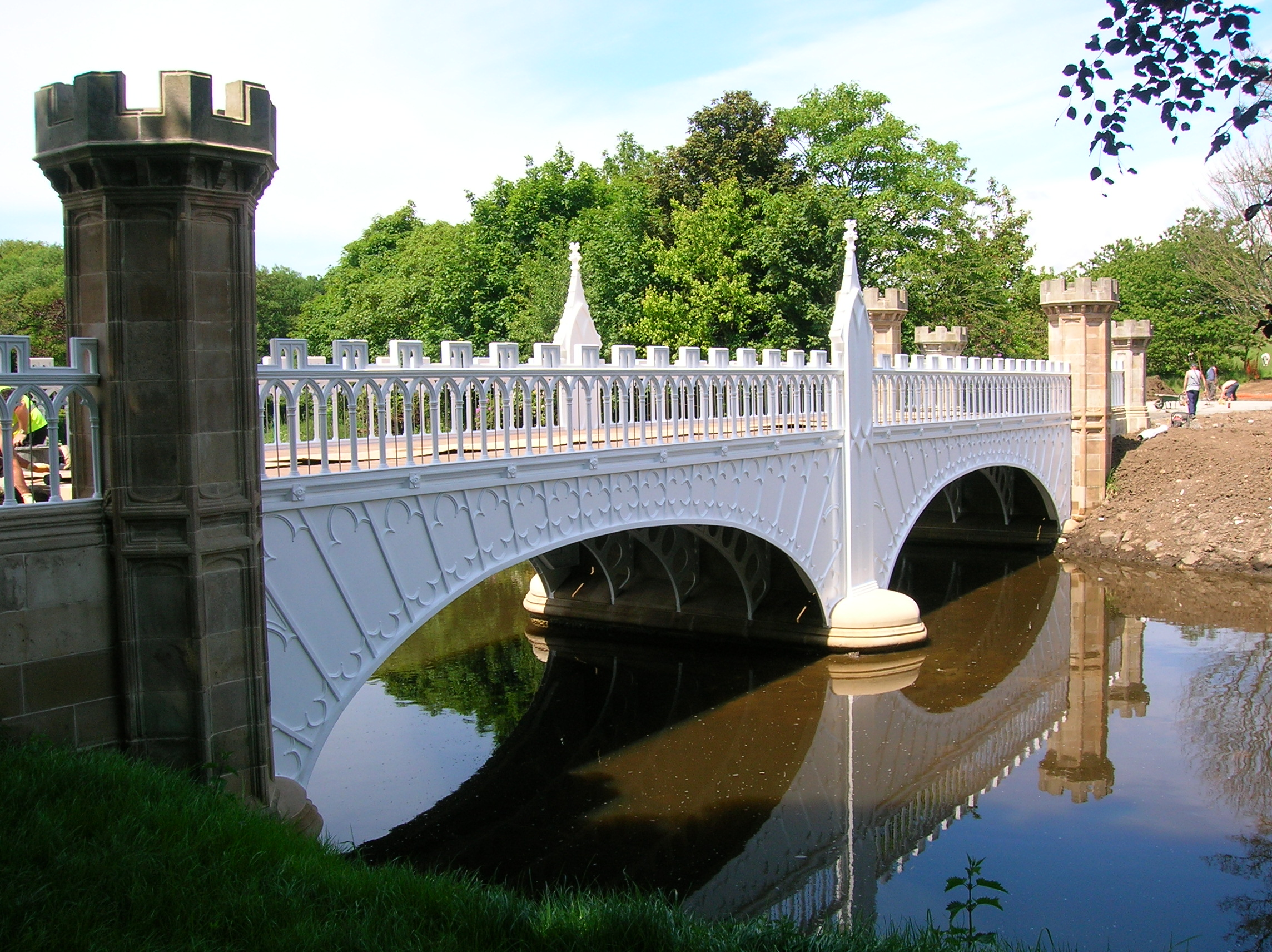
- The bridge after the 2008–2009 restoration
- Coordinates: 55.6446°N 4.6699°W
- Carries: Pedestrians
- Crosses: Lugton Water
- Locale: Eglinton Country Park
- Maintained by: North Ayrshire Council; Historic Environment Scotland

History
- Opened: c. 1845 & 2009

Listed Building – Category B
- Official name: Tournament Bridge
- Designated: 11 June 1972
- Reference no.: LB7570

Location
- Interactive map of Eglinton Tournament Bridge

The Eglinton Tournament Bridge is a bridge located within Eglinton Country Park near Kilwinning, North Ayrshire, Scotland. The bridge crosses the Lugton Water a short distance northwest of Eglinton Castle (grid reference NS 3206 4224) and was named after the Eglinton Tournament of 1839. The castle and surrounding grounds were once home to the Montgomerie family, Earls of Eglinton and chiefs of the Clan Montgomery.

== History ==
=== The Tournament Bridges ===
The surviving 'Tournament Bridge' was built to provide an appropriate crossing point to gain access to the far side of the Lugton Water and the Eglinton Kennels, circa 1845. Archibald Montgomerie, the 13th Earl of Eglinton had the bridge built in a Gothic style, using cast iron for the arches, pinnacles, etc. and stone for the two pairs of miniature ornamental towers at either end. These towers have subtle design differences (see photographs) which are significant in the context of the extended history of the bridge. This 'Tournament' bridge is said to have been designed by the architect David Hamilton; agreement to build the original three arched bridge was reached on 16 October 1799 by the 12th Earl of Eglinton and Hamilton's first recorded work dates from 1807. An Adam Russell is recorded as being partner to the agreement. The first bridge is described by Aiton in 1811 as "a bridge of three arches, the piers of stone, and the arches of cast-iron, of the most elegant device, imitating the gothic style of the castle, with the family arms in the centre, now building about 100 yards below the castle, where the river is 102 feet broad".

The bridge's cast-iron parapet is a repetition of the pointed Gothic arch design of the castle, surmounted by a battlement, and relieved in the centre with foliated pinnacles. The Tournament Bridge is B listed by Historic Scotland.

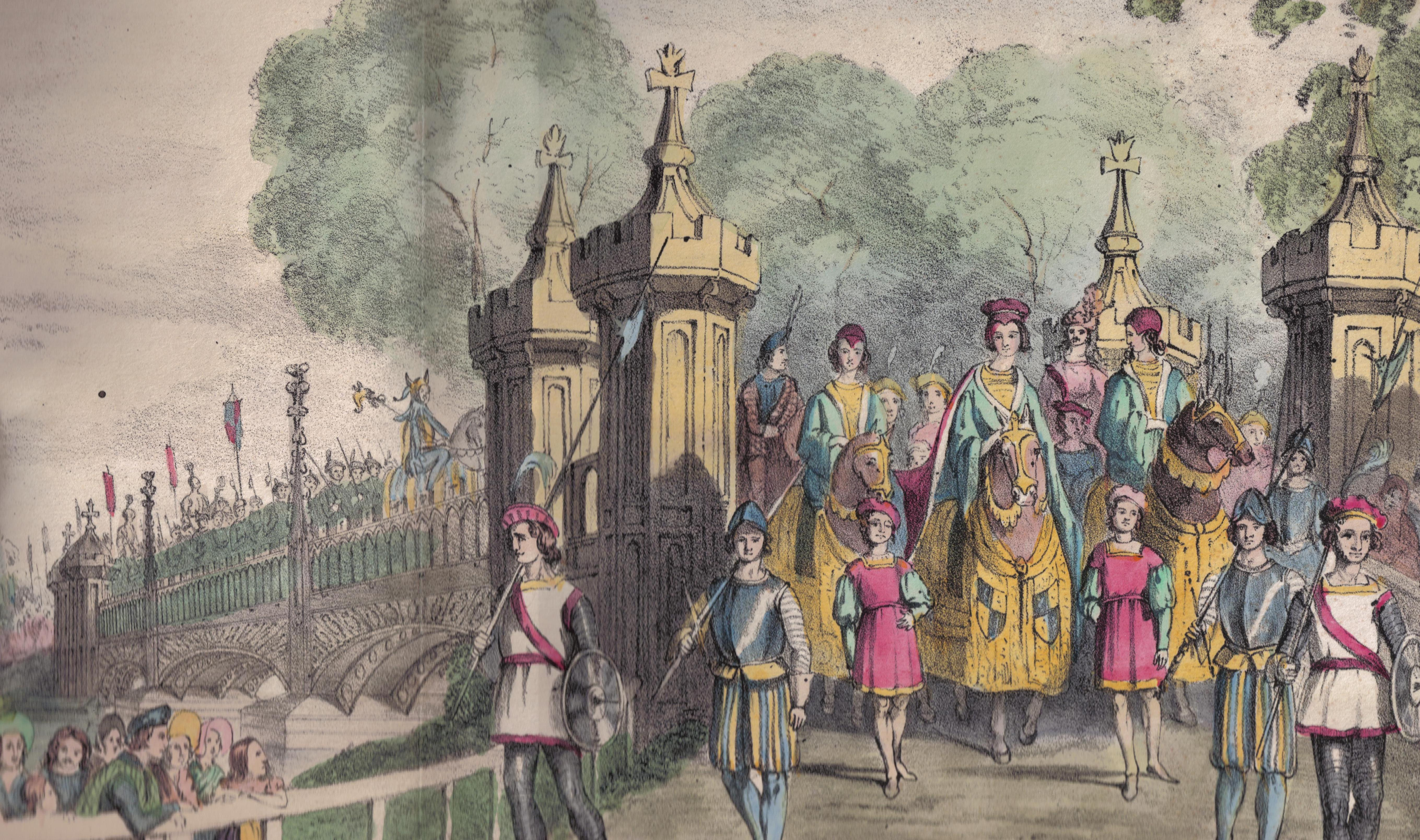
The original Tournament Bridge and the procession in 1839. Note the three cast-iron arches, crossed finials, pinnacles, and the taller, broader towers, etc. characteristic of that bridge.

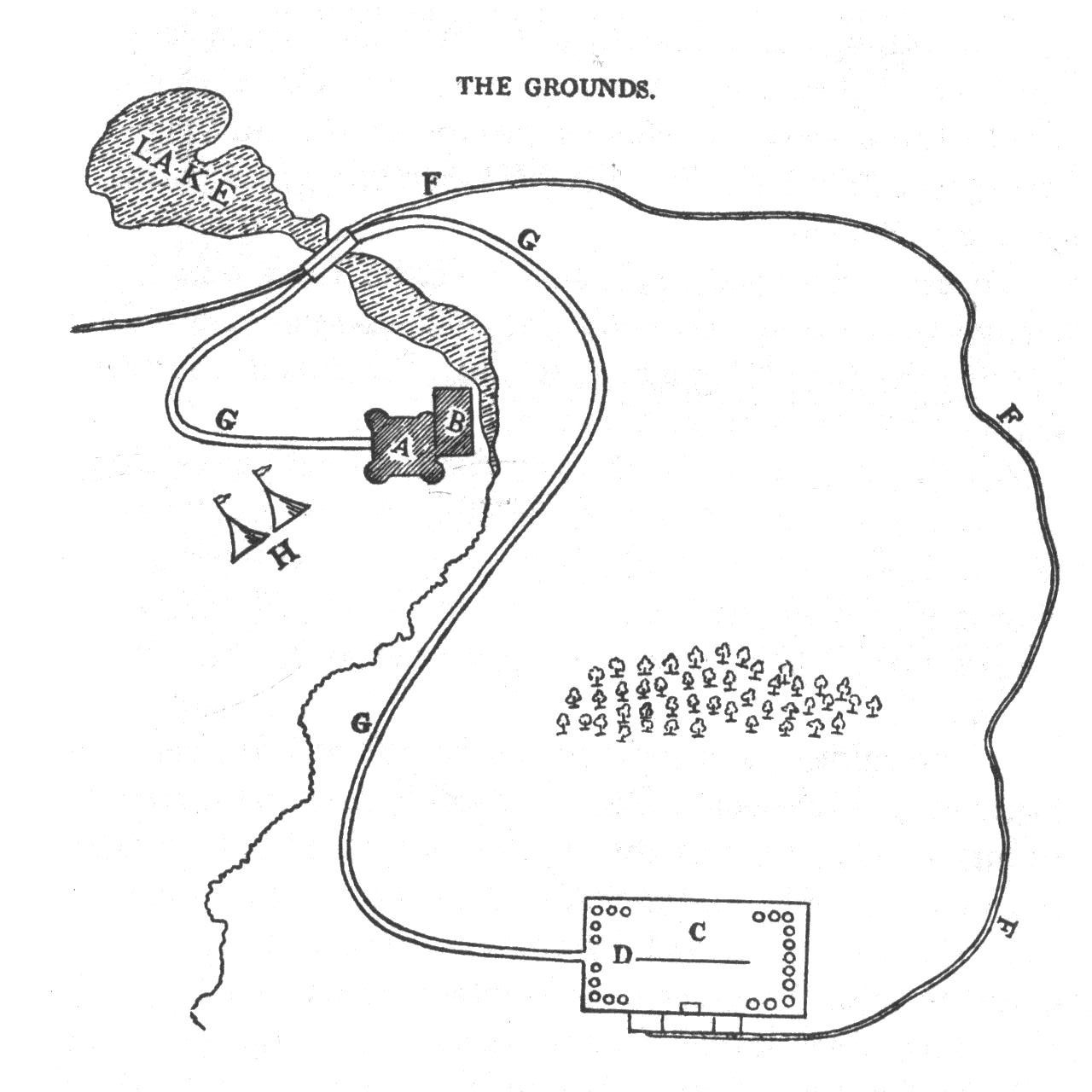
A map showing the layout of the various features associated with the Eglinton Tournament. Note the lakes either side of the bridge, formed around 1800.

The 1839 Eglinton Tournament was held on a meadow or holm at a loop in the Lugton Water. Most of the holm no longer exists, the excavations in this area having provided gravel and sand for the construction of the Kilwinning bypass and leaving behind an excavation pit which is now known as Eglinton Loch. The Knights on horseback and their retinue reached the tilt yard ('C' on the map) via an enclosed ride ('G' on the map), whilst the guests and visitors made their way to the stands via the route marked 'F' on the map illustrated. Both groups crossed over the previous three arched Gothic bridge. A map of 1837 of Eglinton Castle, Grounds and Tilt yard of 1837 shows that the tilt yard was already in existence at this early date, but it is not recorded what its fate was after the tournament was over.

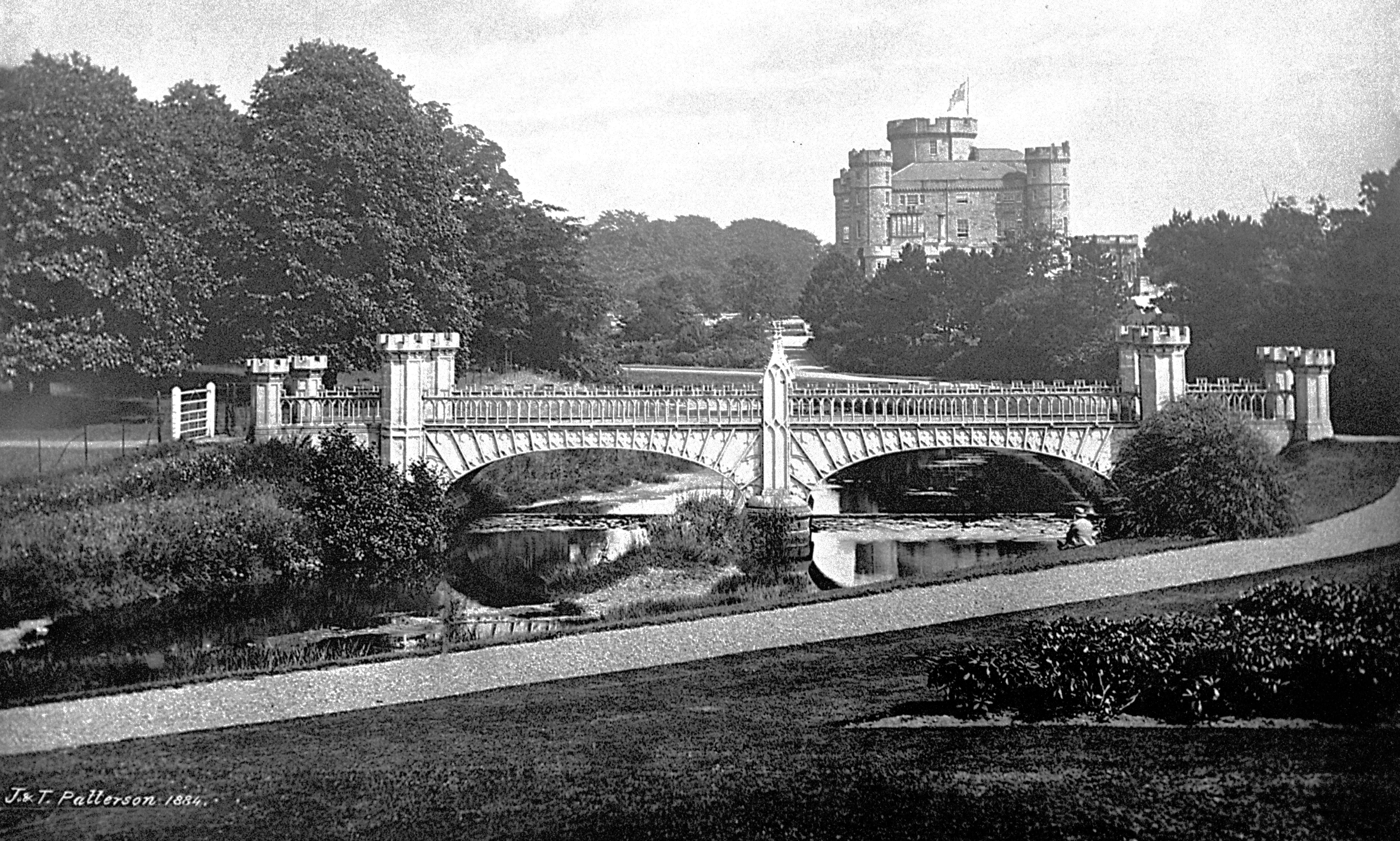
The castle and Tournament Bridge in 1884

The 'new' Tournament Bridge served as a well used route across the Lugton Water, running through the Deer Park to Eglinton kennels (previously known as Laigh Moncur), especially on days when the Eglinton Hunt met at the castle itself. It was built by Messrs Connell of Dalgarven, using parts of the original bridge and possibly to a design by David Hamilton. Messrs. Connell also built the new Kilwinning Tower to a design by David Hamilton.

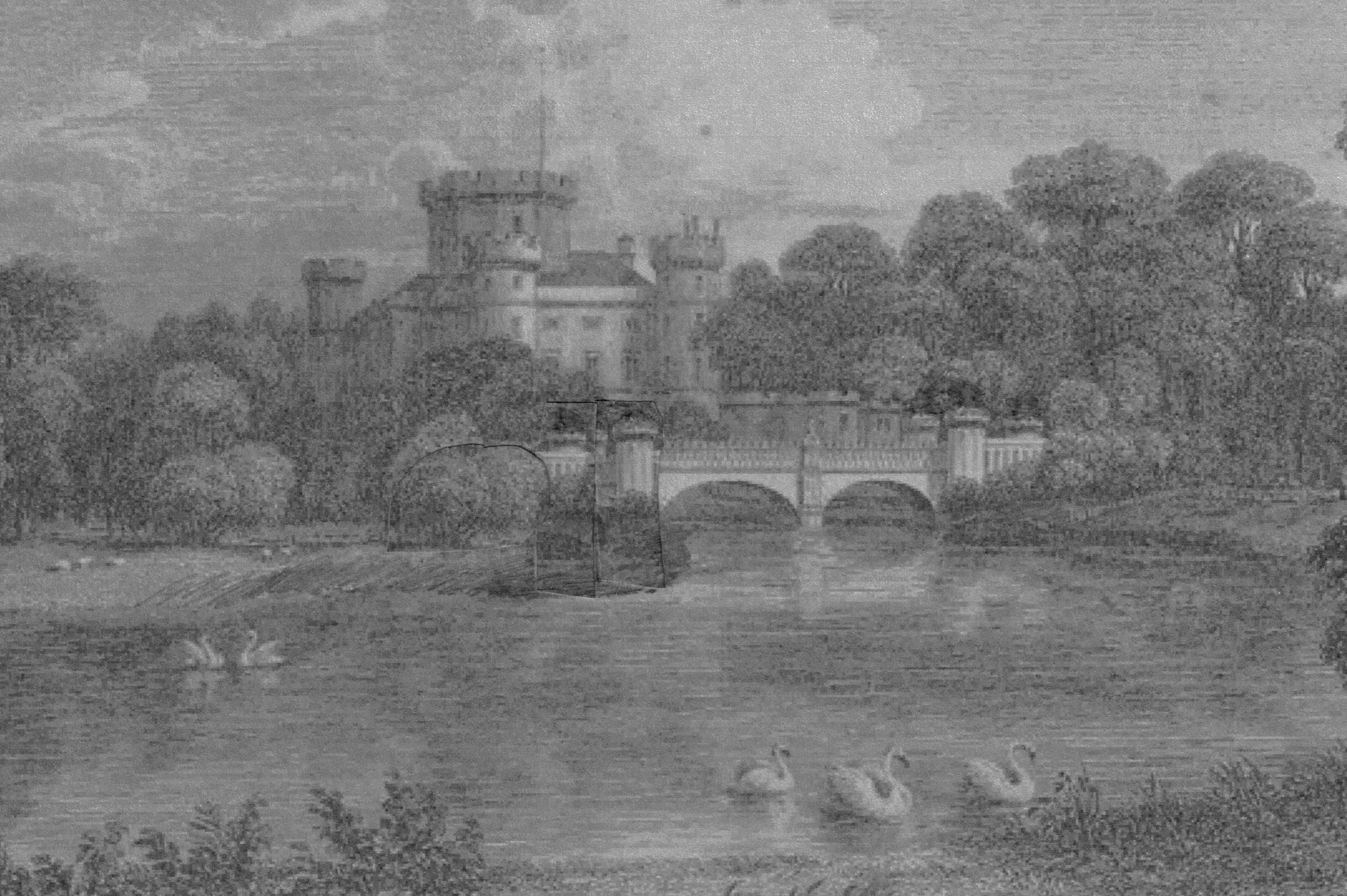
The 'old' Tournament Bridge converted artificially to two arches, etc. for comparison

The original bridge, also with four pairs of miniature towers, but with three arches and four pinnacles, stood roughly 100 yards further up the river towards the castle; estate records show that it was built between 1802 and 1806 The original bridge is shown in several contemporary prints and maps as illustrated in the appropriate gallery of this article; the earliest is in William Aiton's book as published in 1811. It was this bridge that was used at the Eglinton Tournament as can be seen from the illustrations of the event, however the name was passed on to the 'new' bridge constructed downstream of it. No clear sign of this three arched bridge remains, a weir having been built at its old position; the 'old' bridge was constructed in 1811 according to Close., therefore around the time of the 'new' castle being built in 1801/2 and also when the grounds were being laid out by Tweedie.

Surviving architects drawings show the designs for a three arched bridge and as stated, contemporary prints of the Eglinton Tournament also show a three arched Tournament bridge, with cast-iron arches, pinnacles and parapets which may have been re-used in the later 'new' bridge which survives today. David Hamilton is recorded on the 1811 engraving as being the architect. A splendid archway was planned to be built for the tournament at the bridge, however this not recorded in the engravings.

The point at which the 'old' bridge crossed the Lugton was 102 feet broad and 100 yards downriver from the castle. It had the Montgomerie coat of arms in the centre. Aiton describes it as being under construction in 1811. The miniature castle towers on the demolished bridge are shown as each being surmounted by a double cross, but these do not figure on the 'new' Tournament Bridge; the 'old' bridge therefore may have been specially embellished for the tournament with temporary additions.

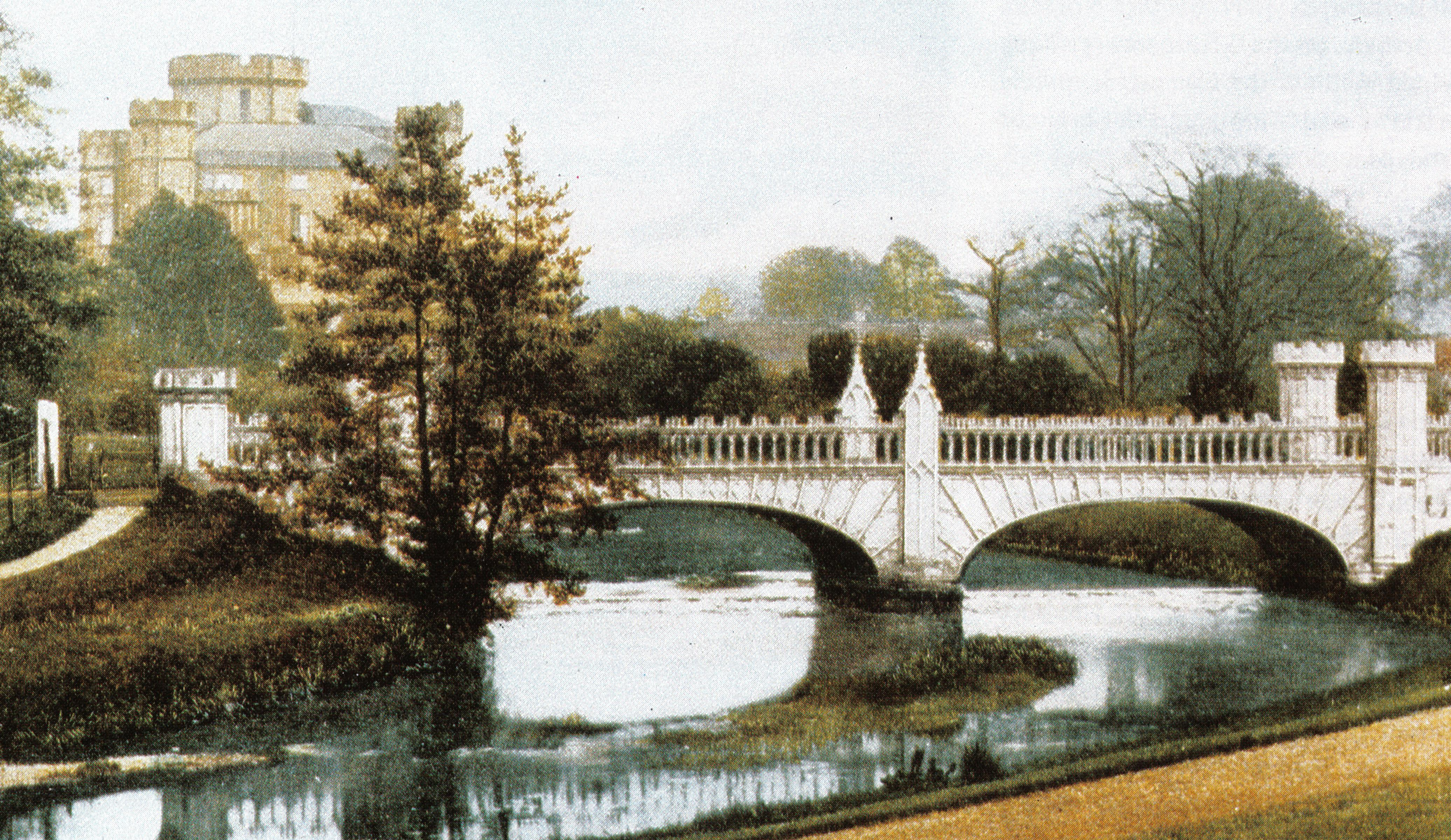
A view of the Tournament Bridge at its 'new' site. The level of the weir was lower at this time and was raised at a later date using randomly chosen stones to raise the water level.

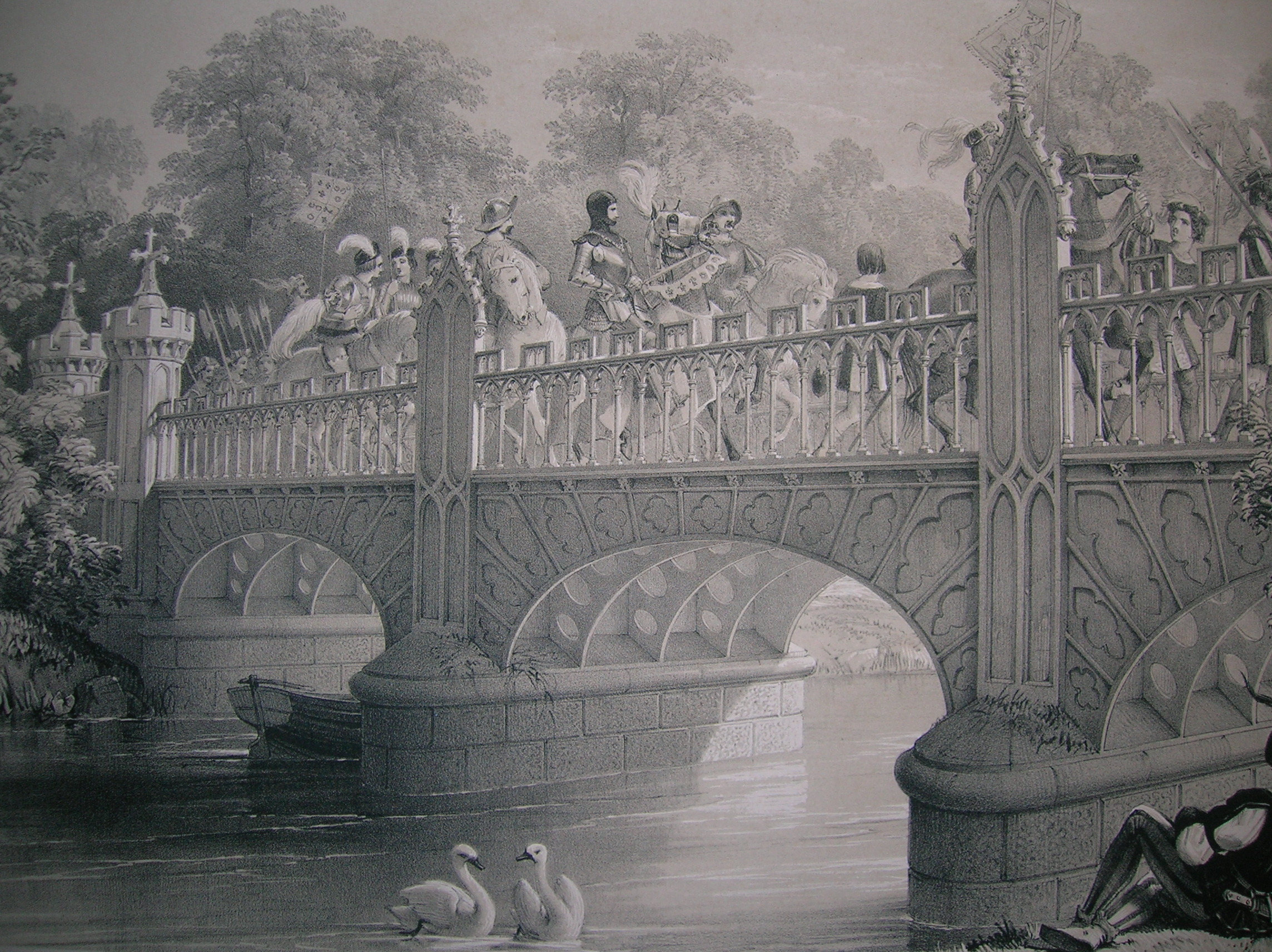
The Lord of the Tournament (Earl of Eglinton) and his esquires and retainers crossing the bridge.

A local minister, the Rev. Lee Ker, confirms which bridge was used at the tournament by relating in his book on Kilwinning that the tournament procession passed over the Water of Lugton by "what is now called the Tournament Bridge, but which was then situated about 100 yards nearer the Castle and had three arches instead of two". This distance coincides with a weir today and an old path from the castle leads directly to it. Dane Love states that the bridge used by the tournament had been built by the 12th Earl in 1811. In contemporary reports of the tournament no special mention of the bridge is made, suggesting that it was already a well established feature of the estate by that time and not an extravagant new feature specially built for the event.

Lauchlan confuses the issue by stating that an older bridge with three arches existed 100 yards up from the present one, however he states that the present bridge was built for the tournament. The old three arched bridge in fact still existed in 1840 and at least as late as 1843.

The Eglinton Bridge had what was probably light with oil lamps as can be seen in the 1811 engraving and the twin towers at either end were both joined by masonry work and not by cast-iron work as in the present day two arched bridge. The Gothic embellishments on the engravings of the 1839 Tournament show that the oil lamps were removed for the event.

=== Construction of the 'new' Tournament Bridge ===
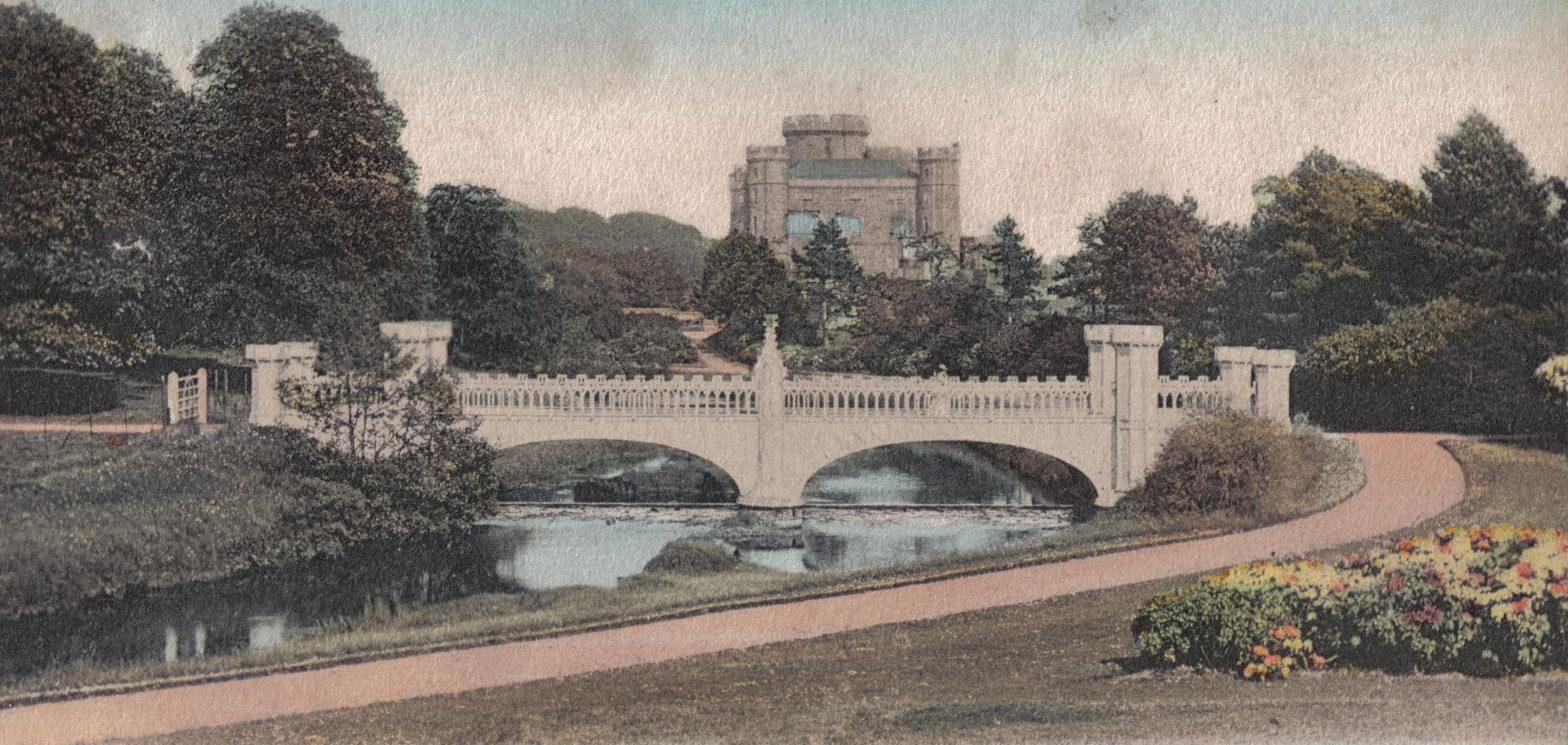
The bridge in 1905

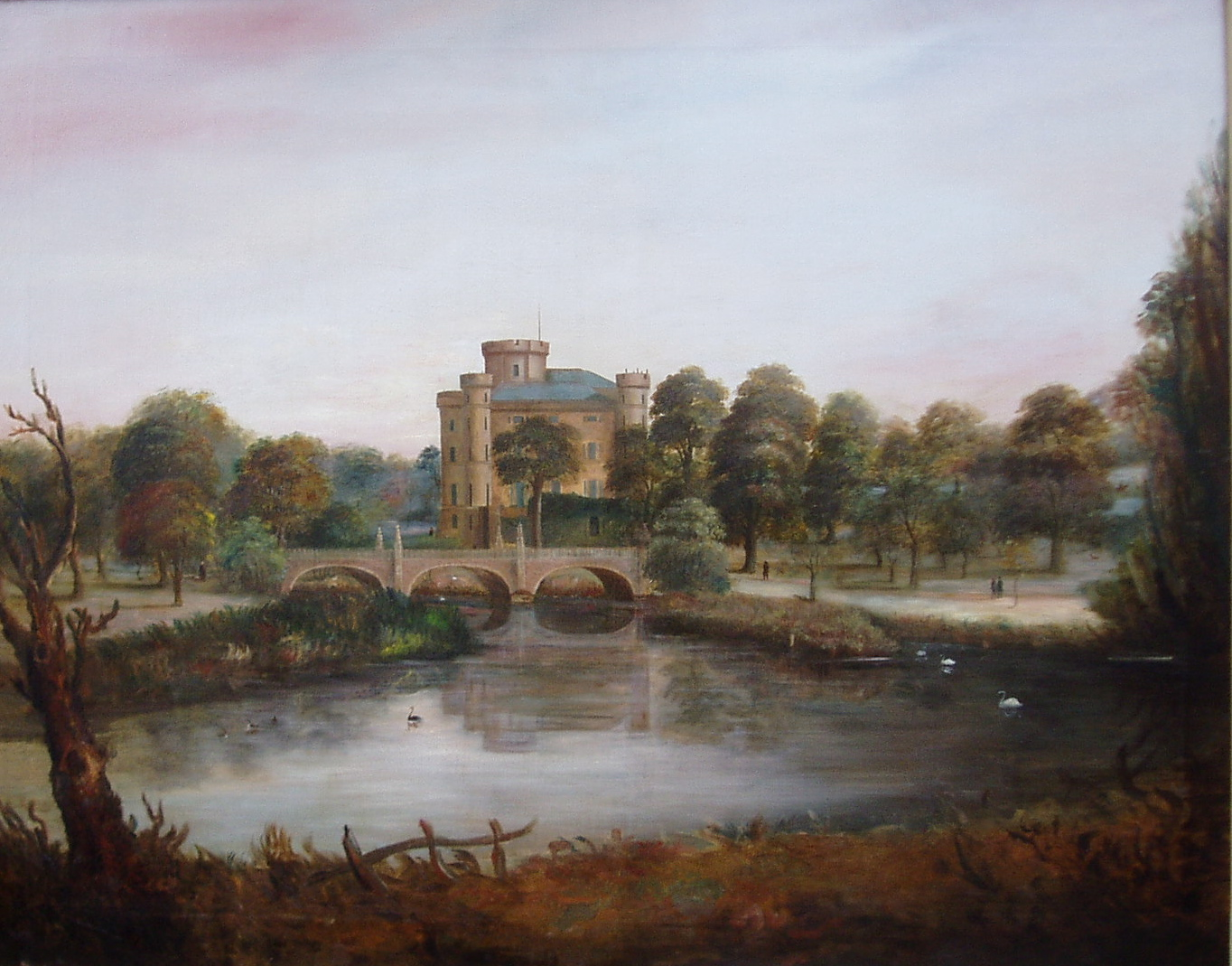
Eglinton Castle, circa 1830

The new bridge may have been erected by the 13th Earl at some time between 1843 and 1856 as part of the total re-modelling of the course of the Lugton Water which had been first undertaken by the 12th Earl (1740–1819) and which included the alteration of its course, the removal of the lakes or ponds and the creation of several weirs. The Lugton Water is liable to severe floods and damage to the easily broken cast-iron work by the force of the current, may have been a reason for its reconstruction at a different site; a severe 'Great Storm' in Ayrshire is recorded as having damaged or destroyed several buildings and structures in February 1856. The first Ordnance Survey map of 1856 shows the two arched bridge in position, a weir at the position of the old bridge and by this time the old lake had gone, replaced by a canalised Lugton Water with several weirs.

Ironically the strengthening work done on the 'new' bridge to create an extra arch of bricks in addition to the cast iron, may have weakened the structure, contributing to its eventual partial collapse. The army used the bridge extensively with large lorries and even tanks crossing over it.

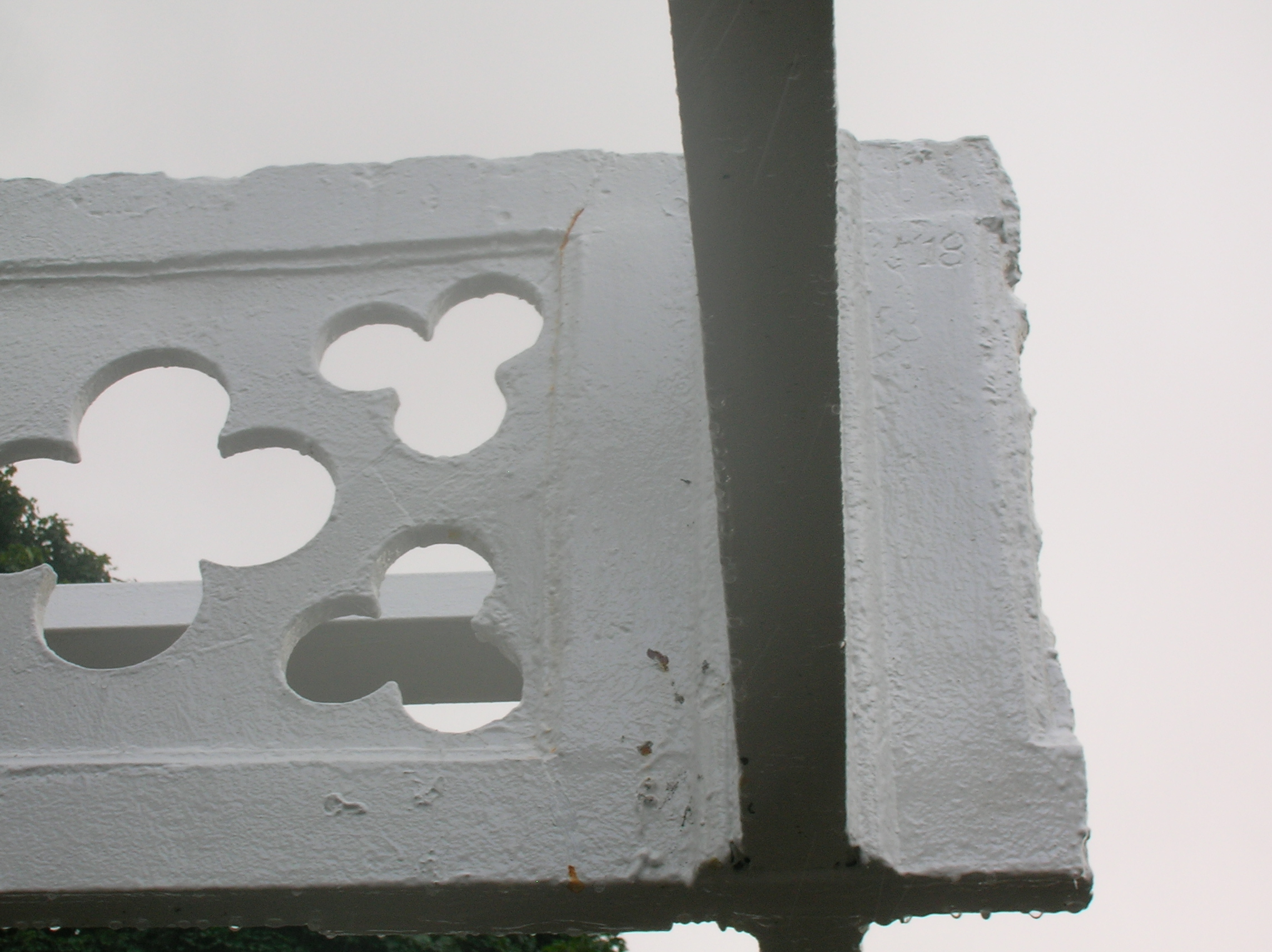
Numbering on the cast-iron arch sections

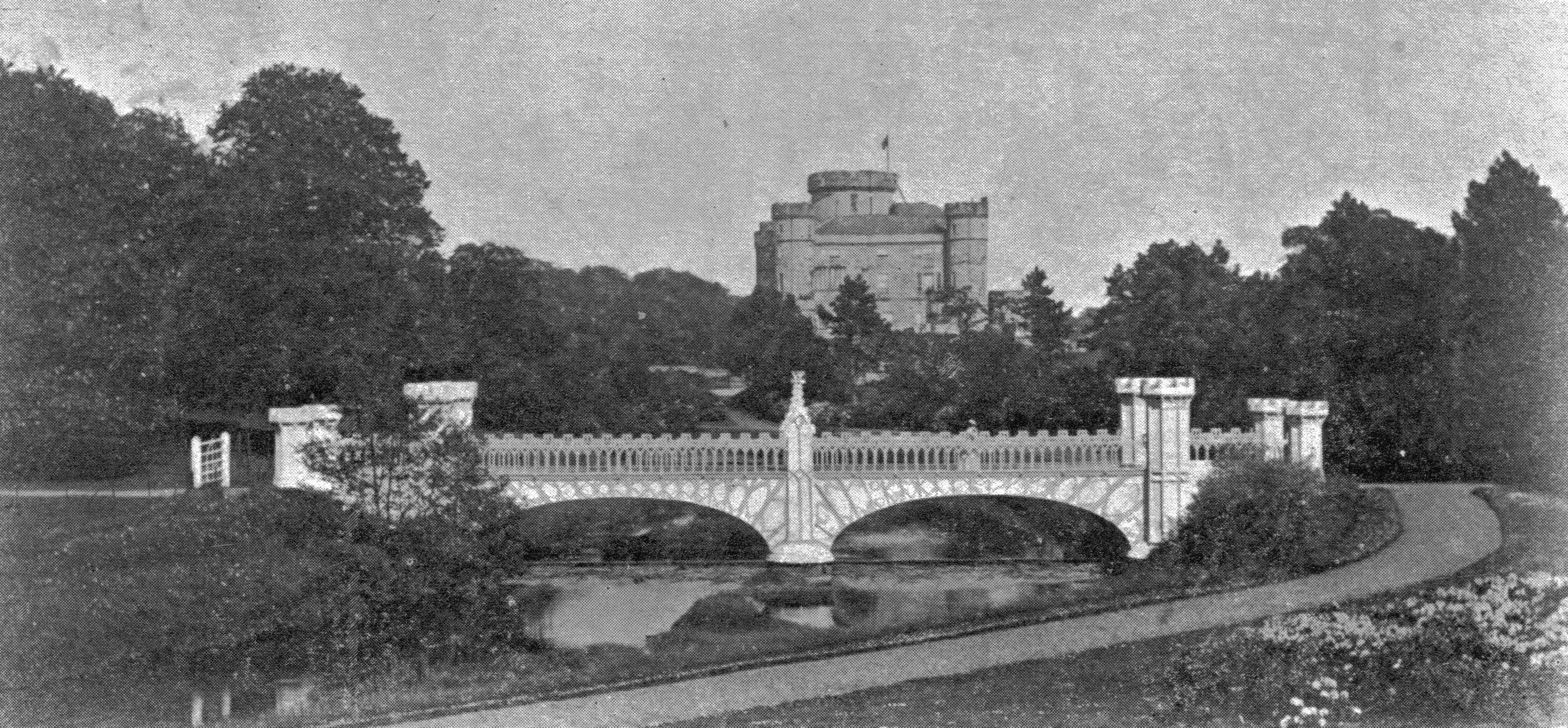
The bridge circa 1905

The lower courses of ashlar on the bridge abutments and central pier were vermiculate. At some point the height of the weir beneath had been raised using an odd assortment of re-used stonework; this would have increased the depth and extent of the waters behind it. The central pier and the original weir had used reworked but re-cycled stone, probably from Kilwinning Abbey; as illustrated by a stone window surround recovered during restoration work (See illustration).

Examination of the top of the outer towers shows that something was attached to the centres, the 'plug' hole still being present. It is possible that the holes are related to the method of lifting them into position during construction work. The larger towers are capped with cement and nothing is therefore visible. During restoration work (2008) electricity power cables or possibly gas pipes were located leading to the bridge and they may have served some form of lighting on the bridge. These are not visible in the available illustrations. The Eglinton estate had its own gasworks and later its own power station, so it would have been natural to provide lighting on the bridge. The old OS maps show that by 1897 the gas works had been established here to supply the castle and offices, whilst by 1911 this had been replaced by an electricity works; the present day park workshop.

The larger and taller inner towers have been re-used from the older bridge, this being confirmed by the presence of ornate carving as infill within one of the larger towers. The curtain walls and the smaller and lower outer towers are made from a different type of stone and, as stated, the towers have a number of architectural differences, suggesting that they were made specifically for the 'new' Tournament Bridge (See photographs). During work on the central pier it was found that some of the hidden infill work is vermiculate ashlar from the 'old' bridge.

The cast-iron sections of the arches are numbered and some of the sequence are absent, suggesting that these missing sections may have been damaged previously beyond repair and were not used therefore in the 'new' bridge.

=== Previous Eglinton bridges that crossed the Lugton Water ===
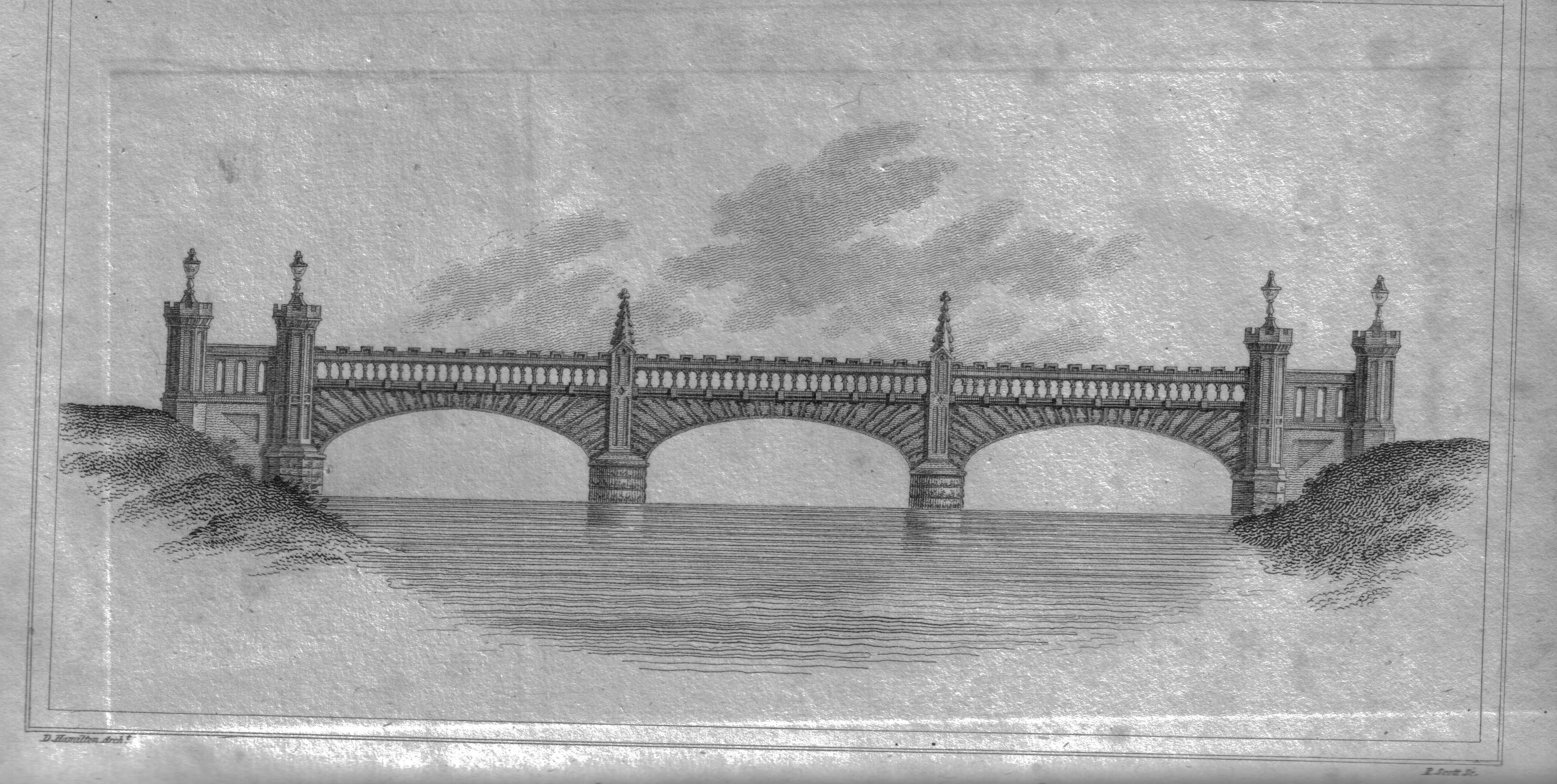
Eglinton Castle bridge in 1811

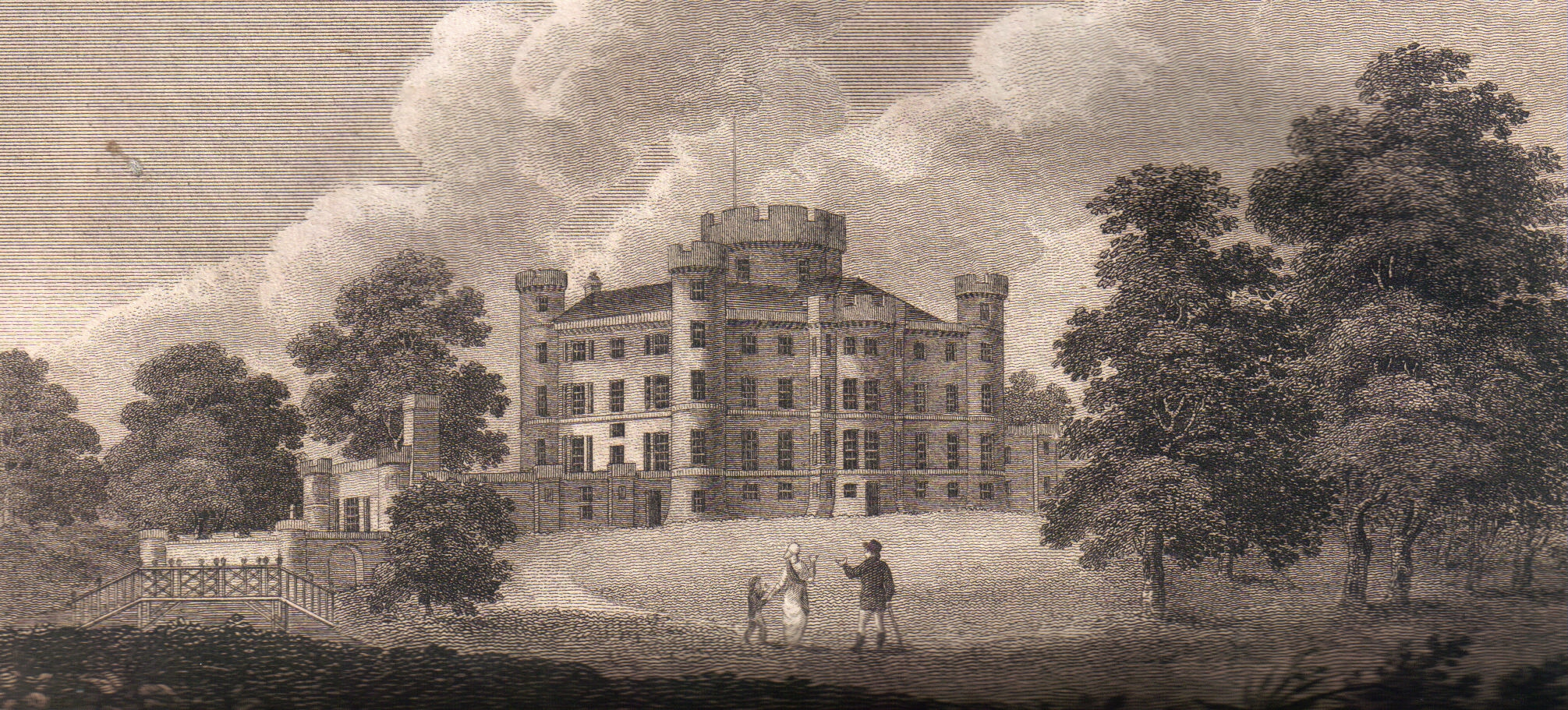
A view of the castle and a wooden footbridge in 1815

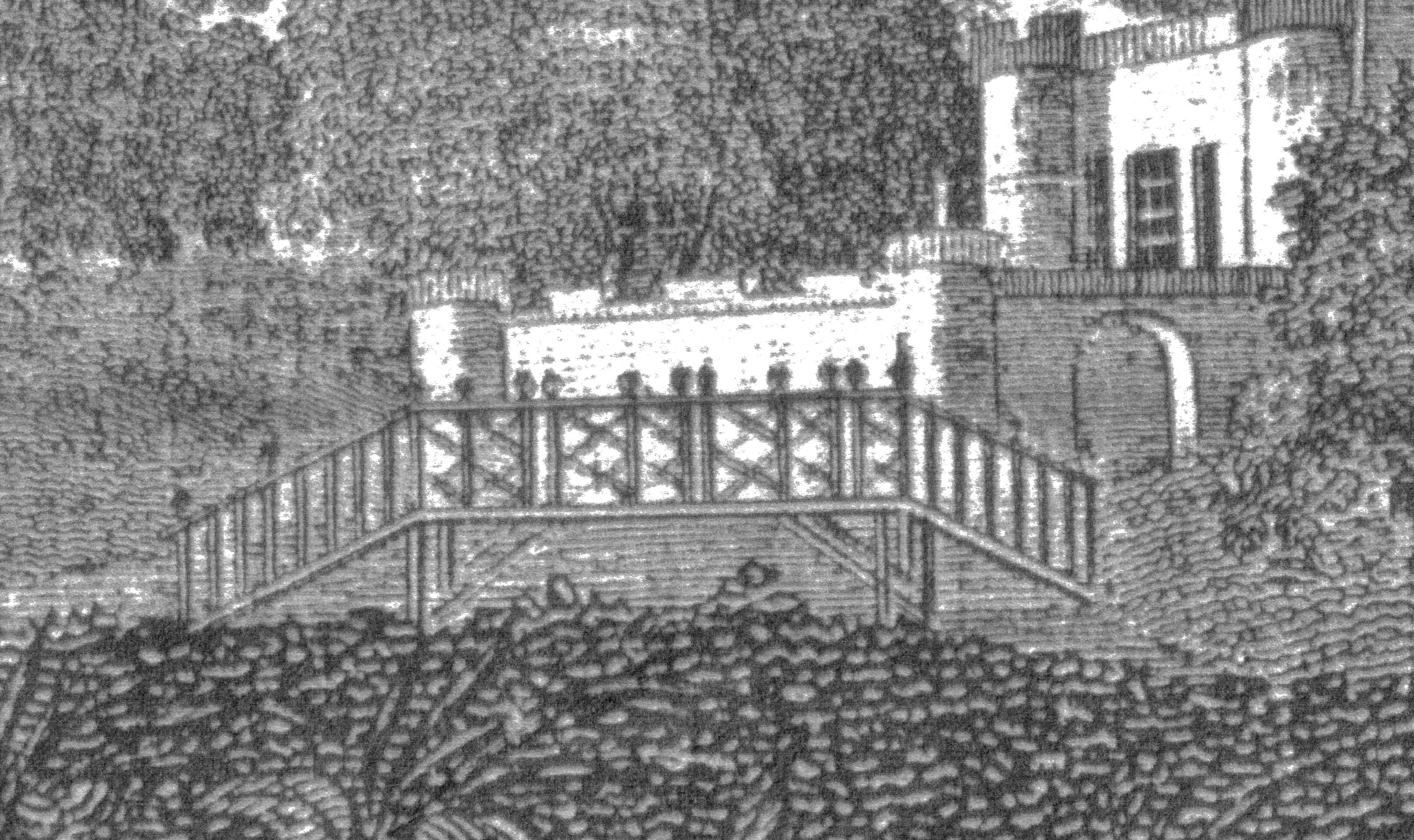
Details of the wooden bridge

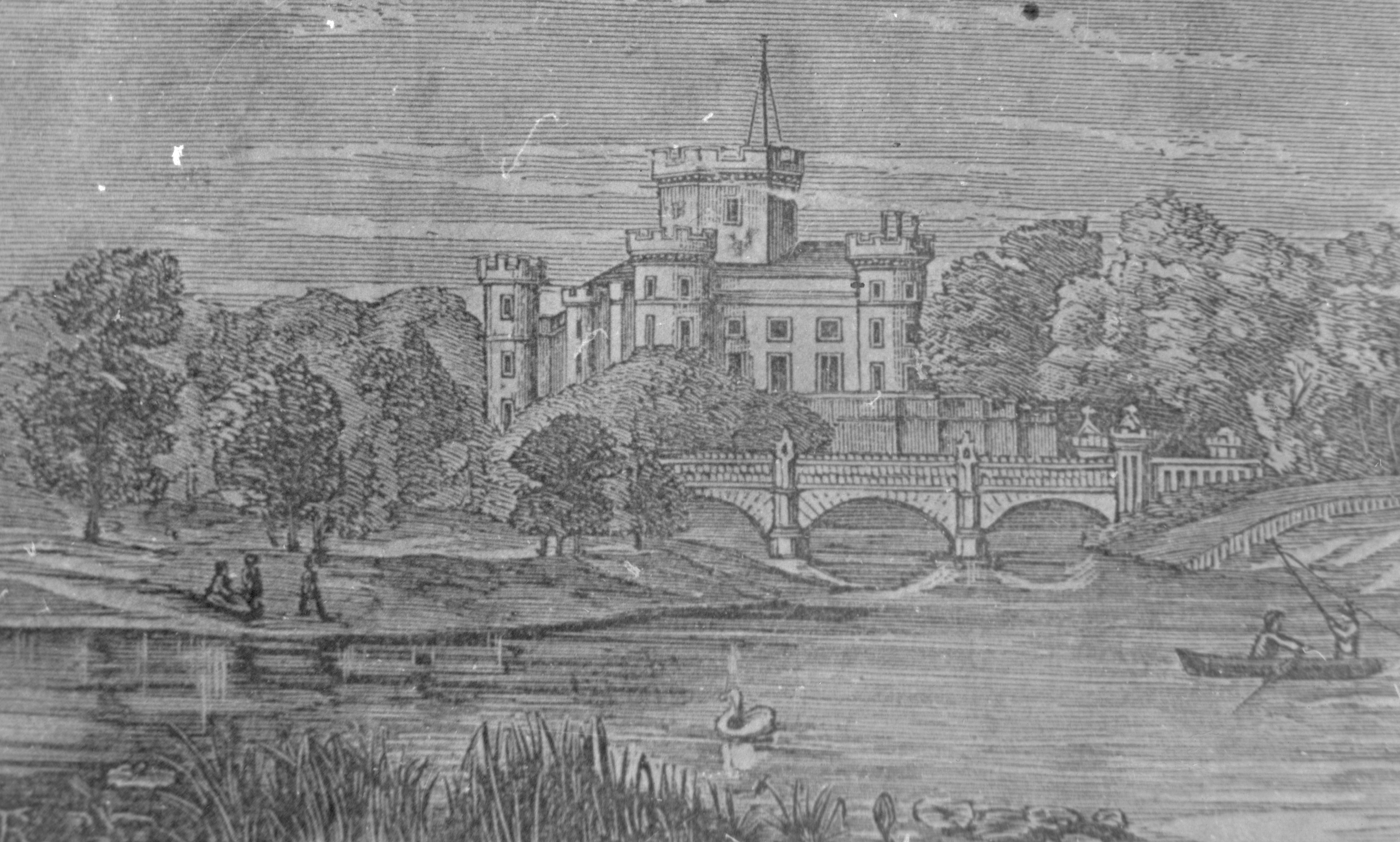
The castle and bridge in 1815. Three arches and a lake are depicted.

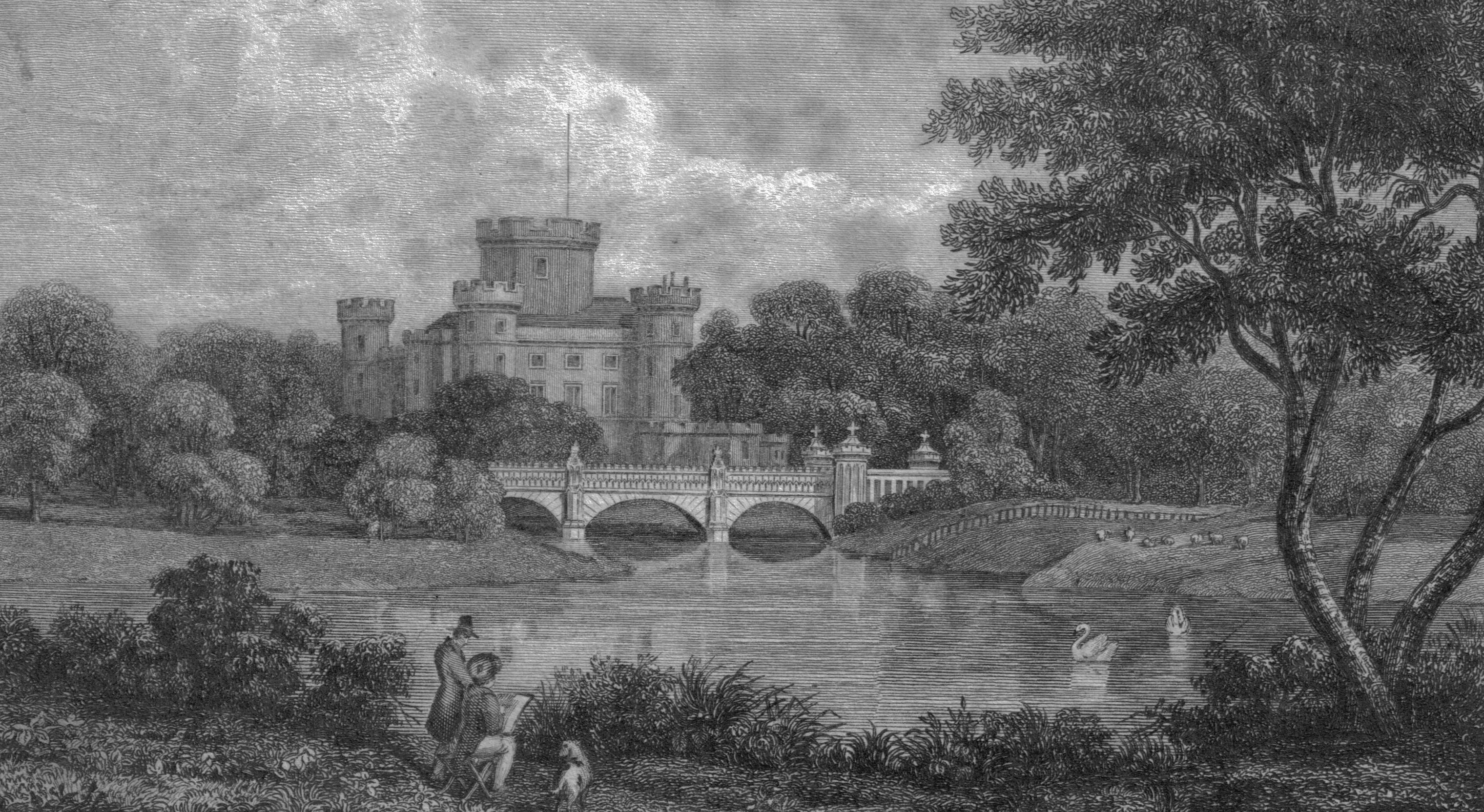
Eglinton Castle & Bridge. This again shows the original three arched bridge, lake, etc. Circa 1843.

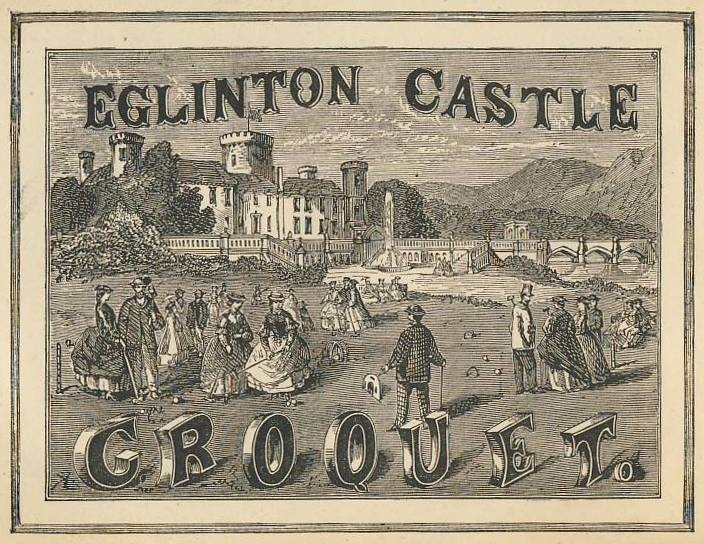
The old three arched bridge in 1865

=== Views of the 'new' c1845 Tournament Bridge ===
Tournament Bridge and castle in 1876

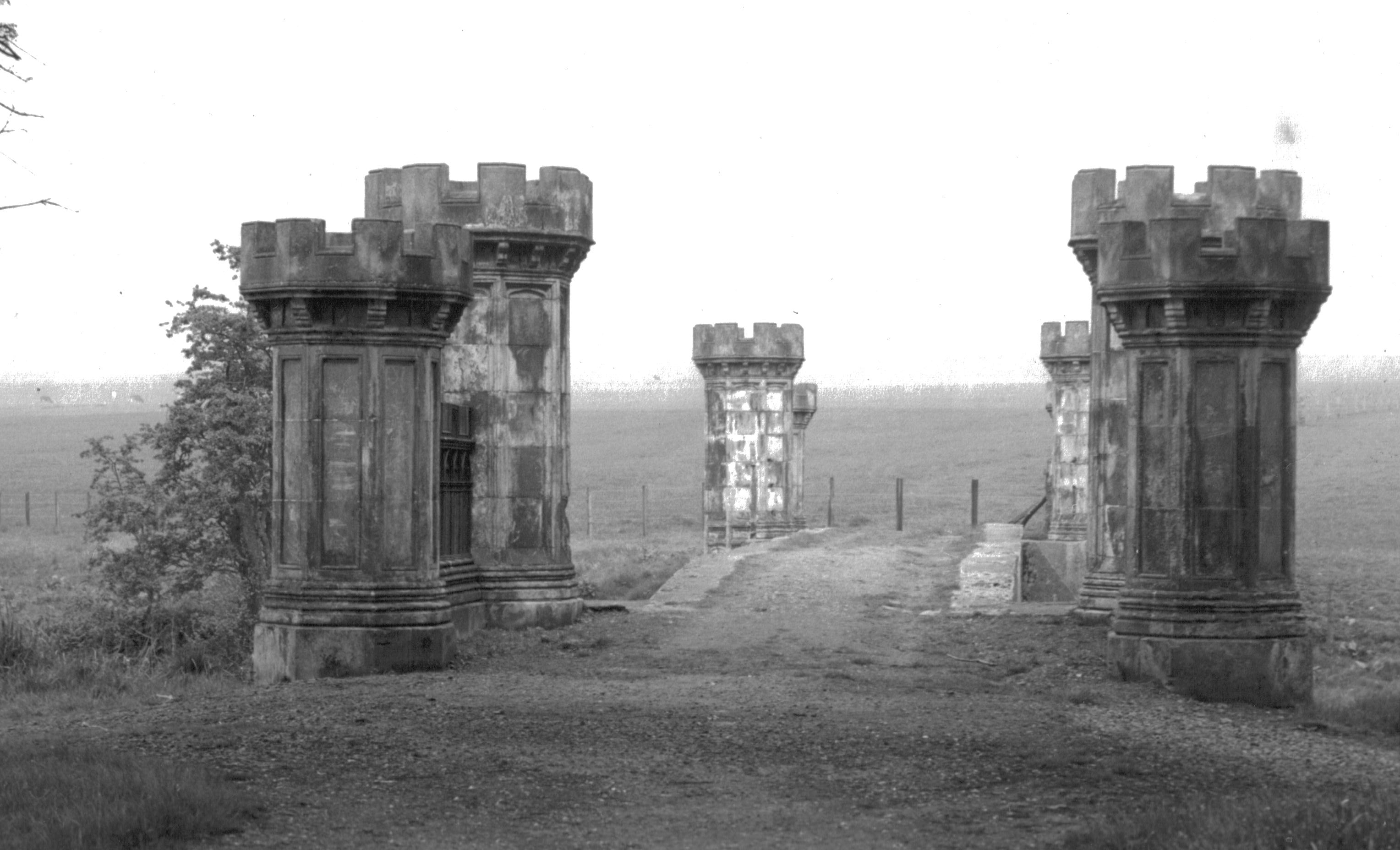
The bridge at its lowest ebb

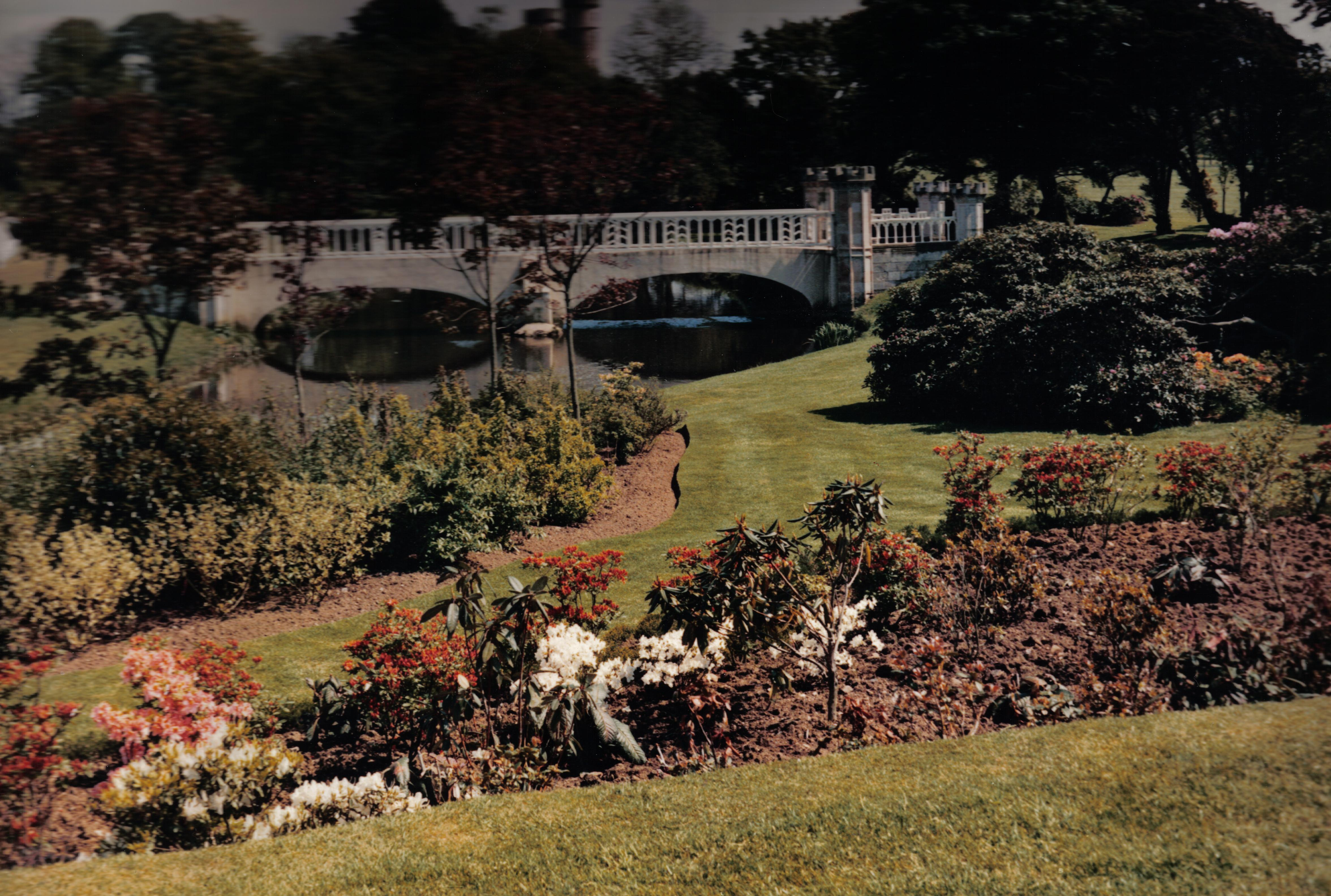
The Tournament Bridge in the 1960s

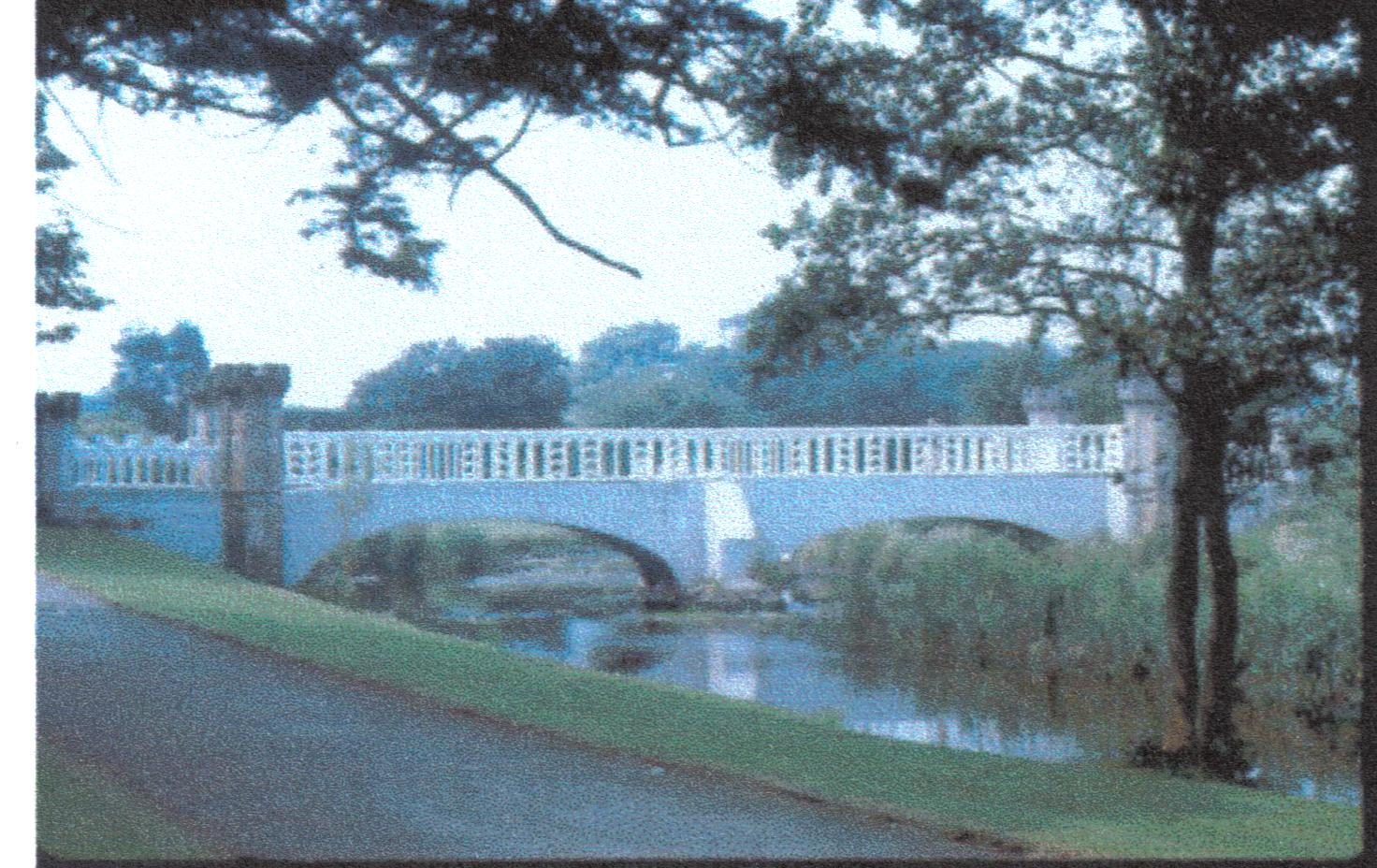
The Tournament bridge as restored in the 1980s

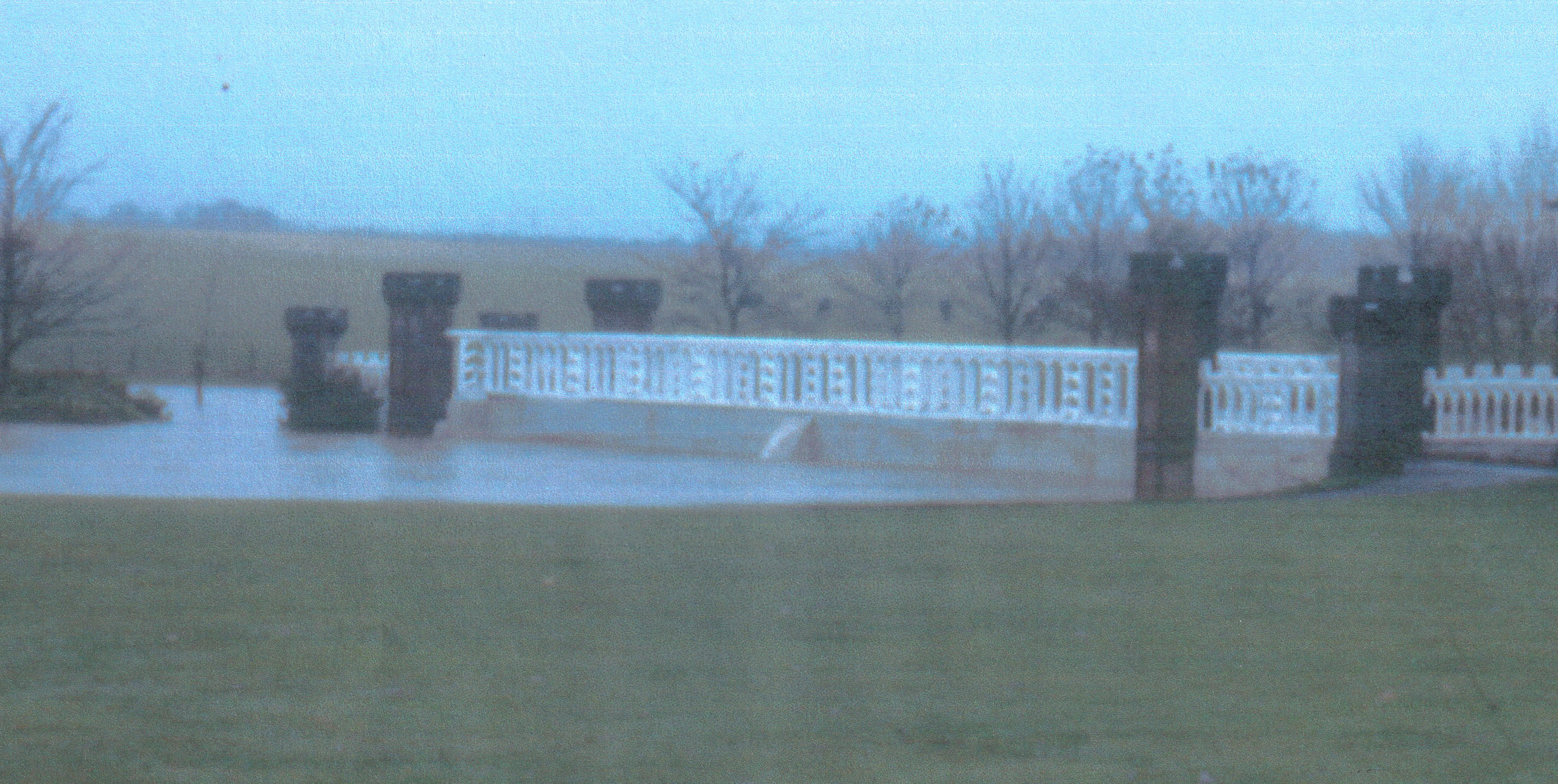
Lugton Water flood conditions

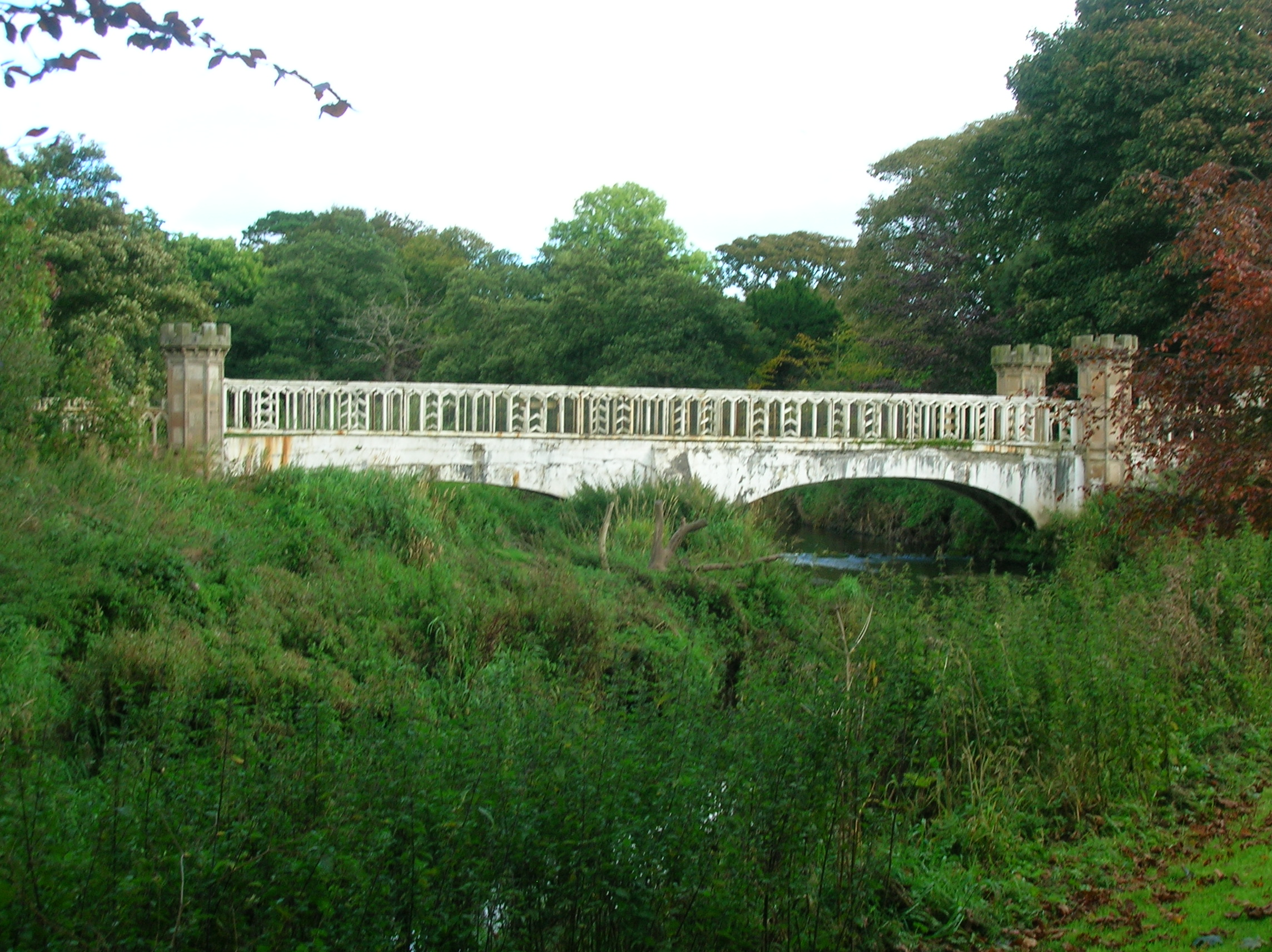
The Tournament Bridge over the Lugton Water in 2007

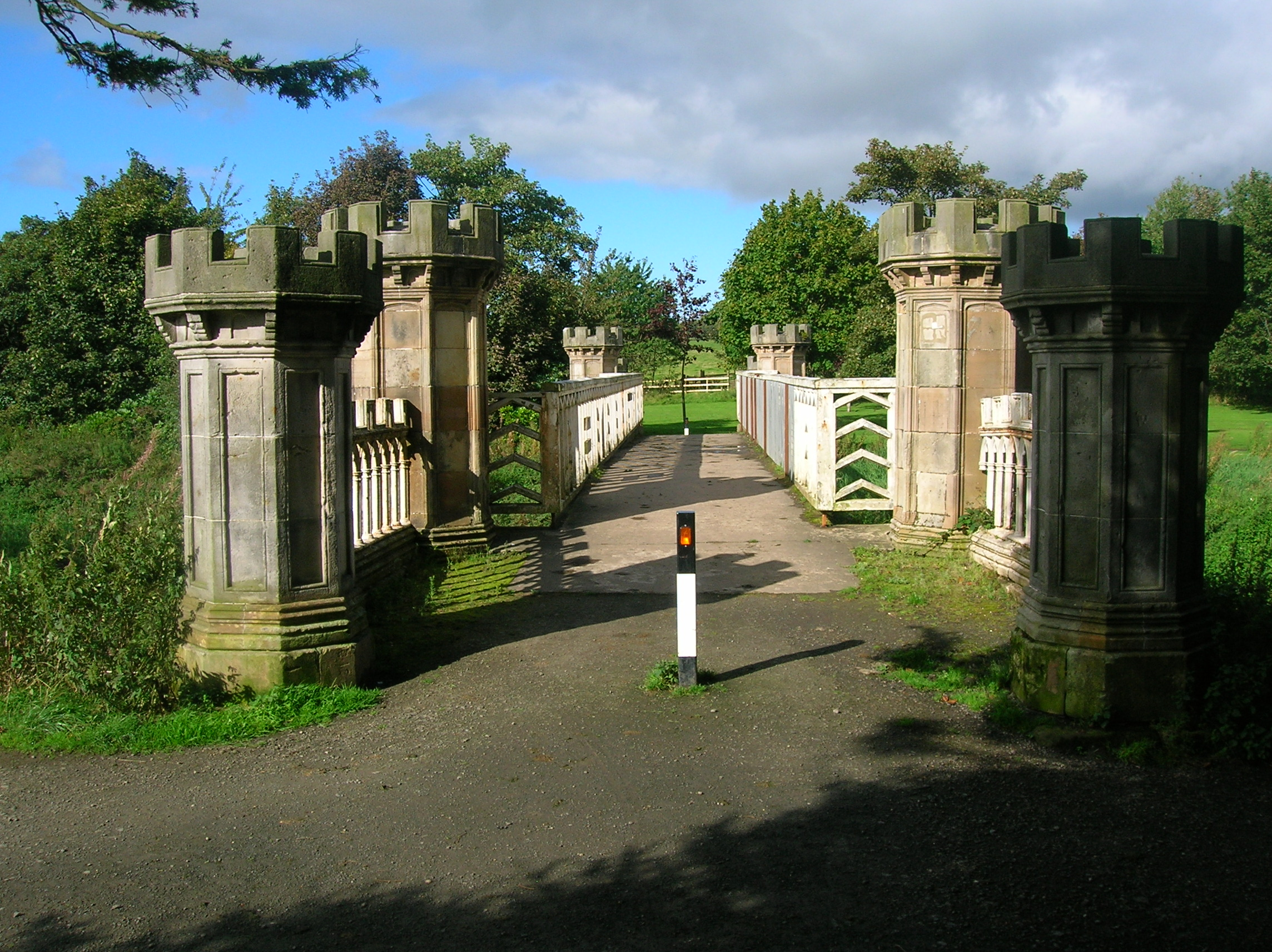
The approach to the Tournament Bridge from the stables in 2007

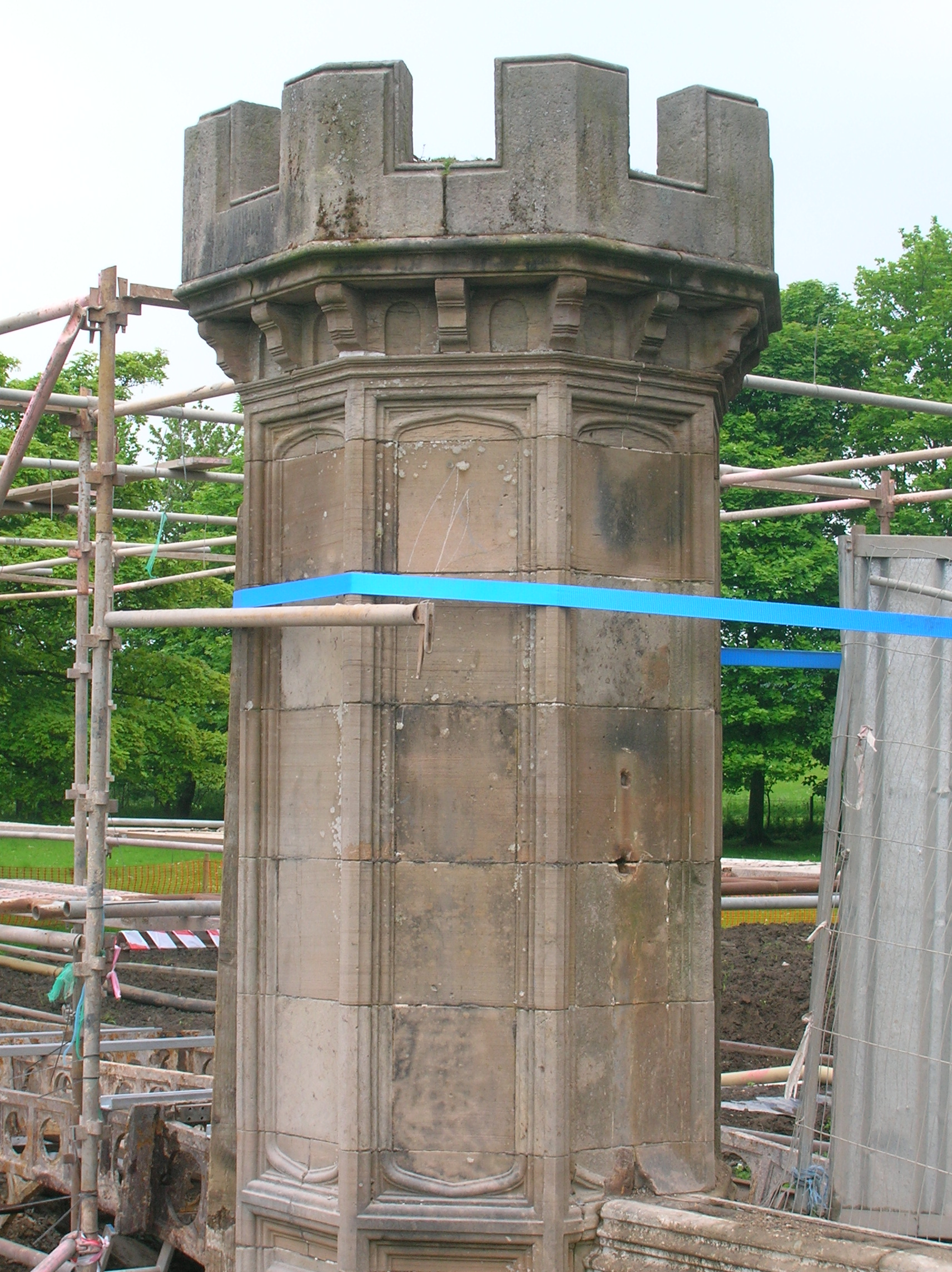
One of the large bridge towers, probably recycled from the 1811 bridge

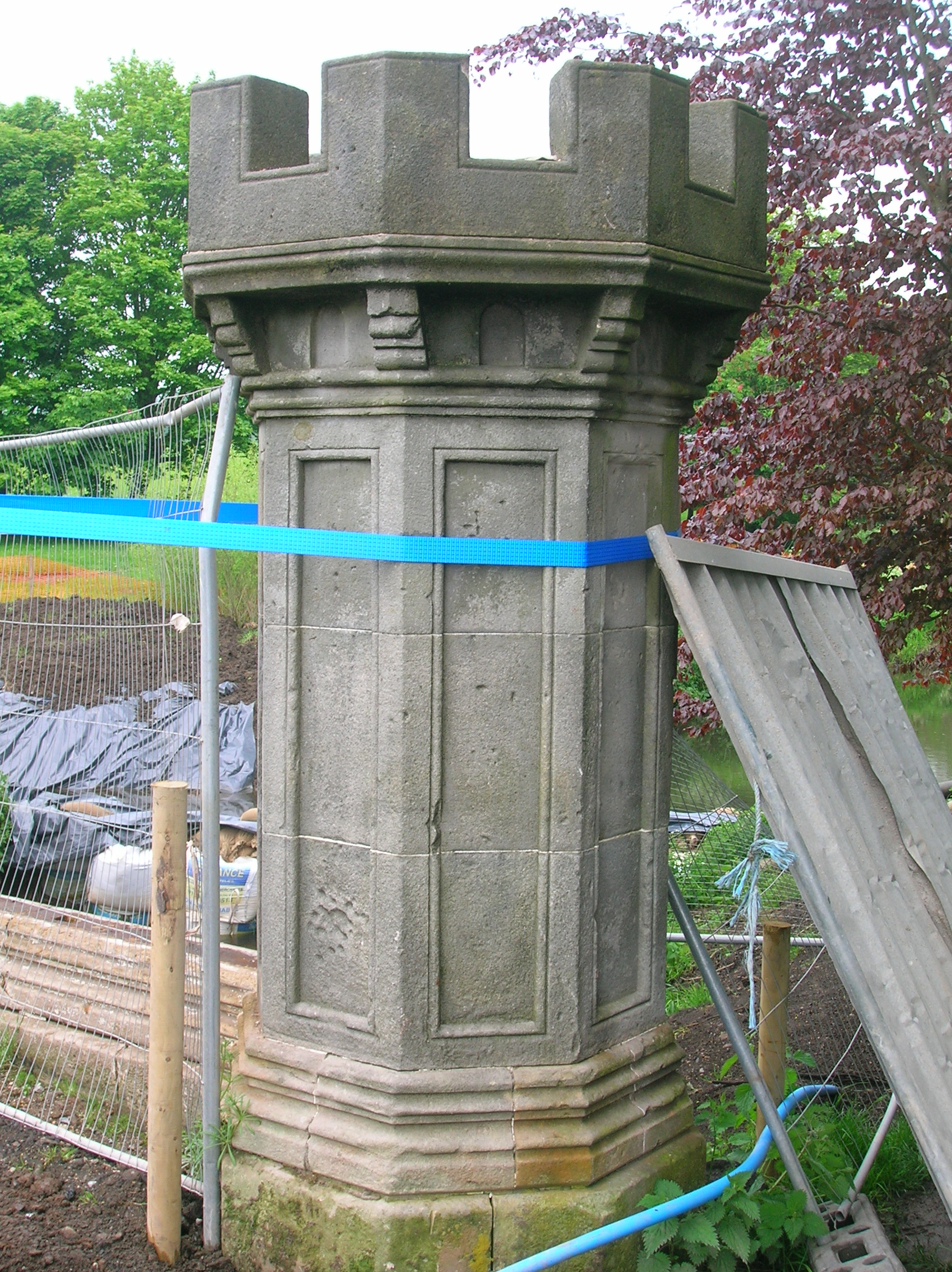
One of the smaller towers with subtle design and carving differences suggesting a later date of construction

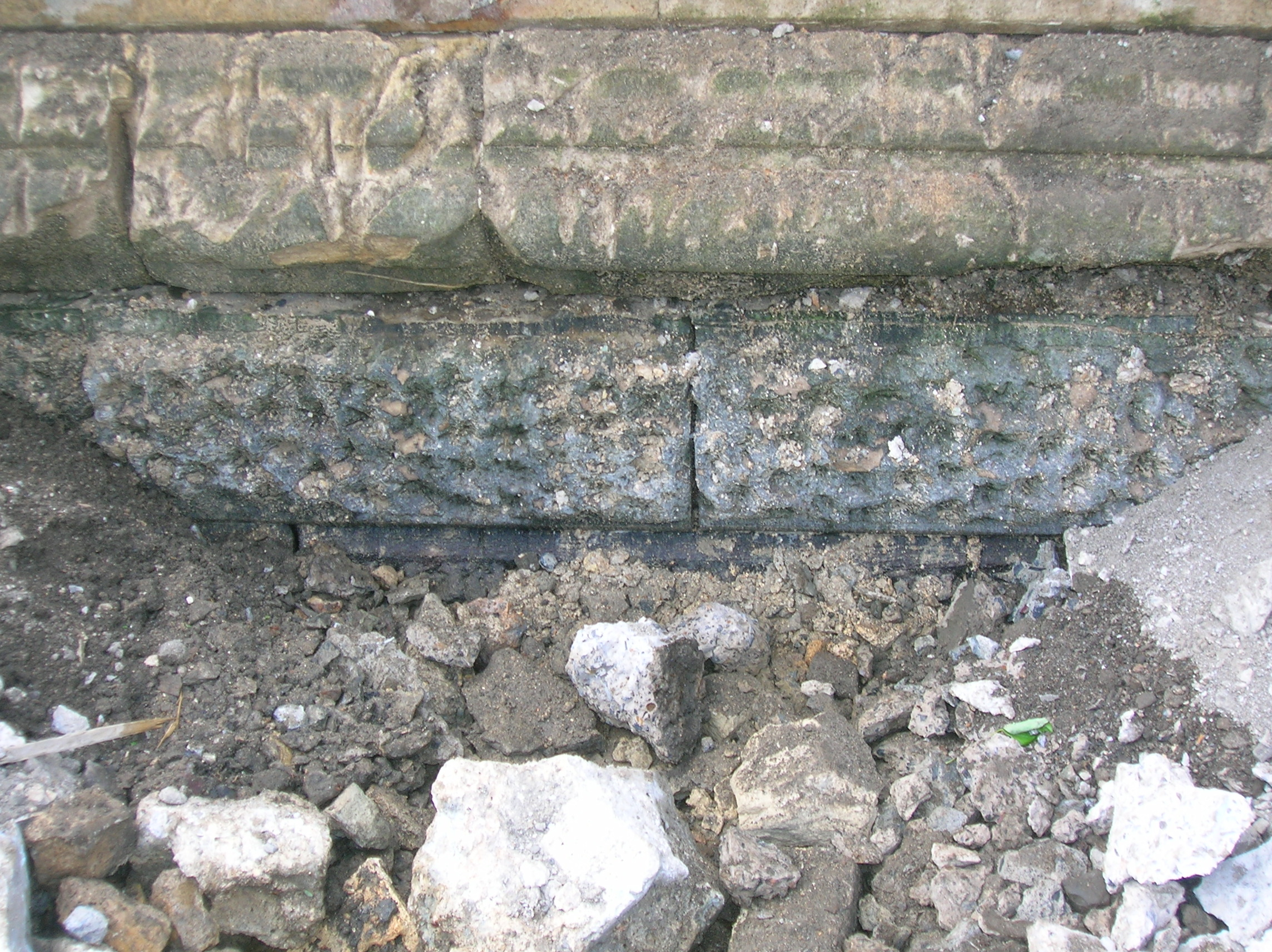
Vermiculate ashlar stonework on the abutment of the bridge at water level

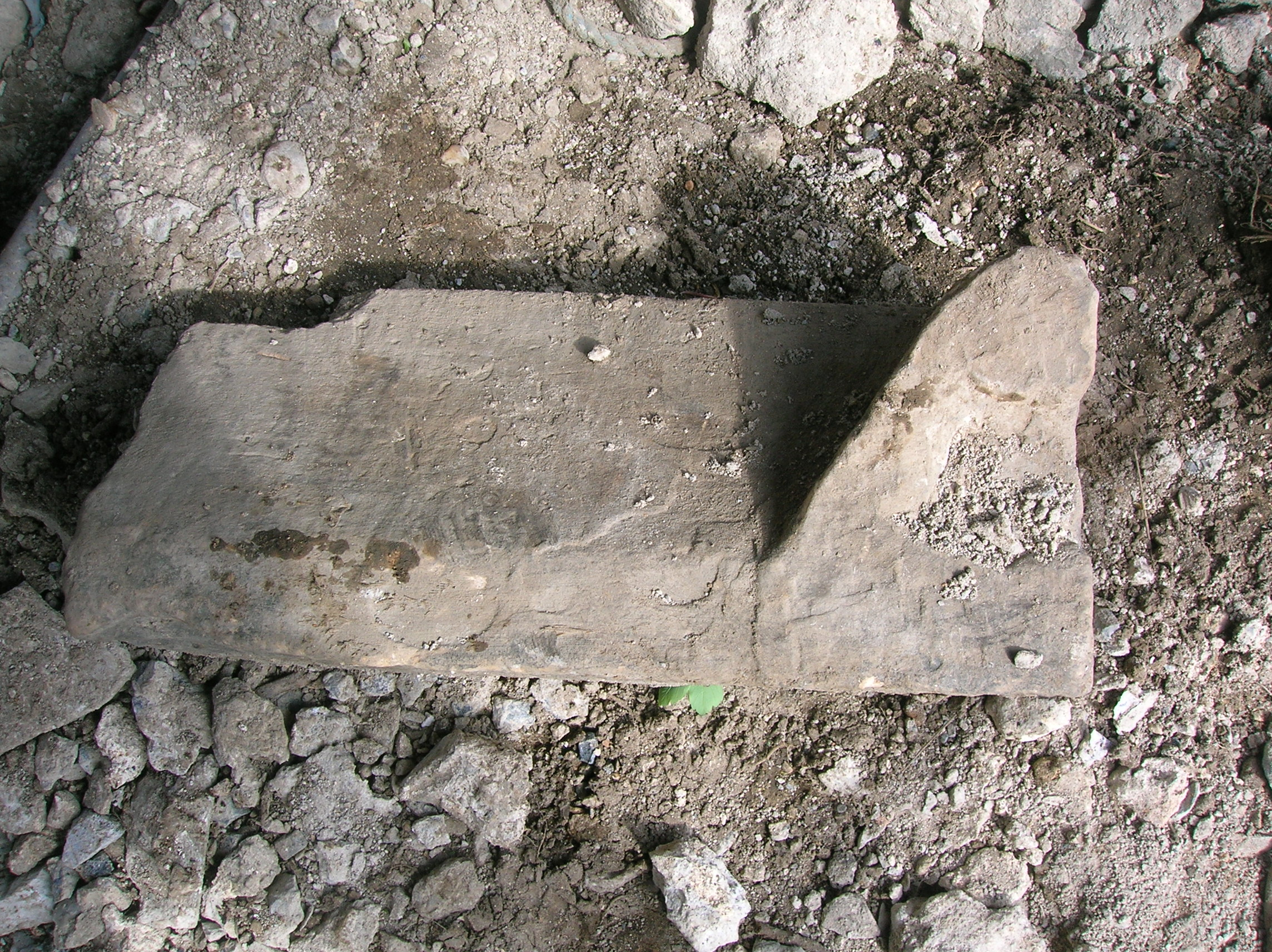
A reworked stone window ledge, possibly from Kilwinning Abbey, used in the weir at the central pier

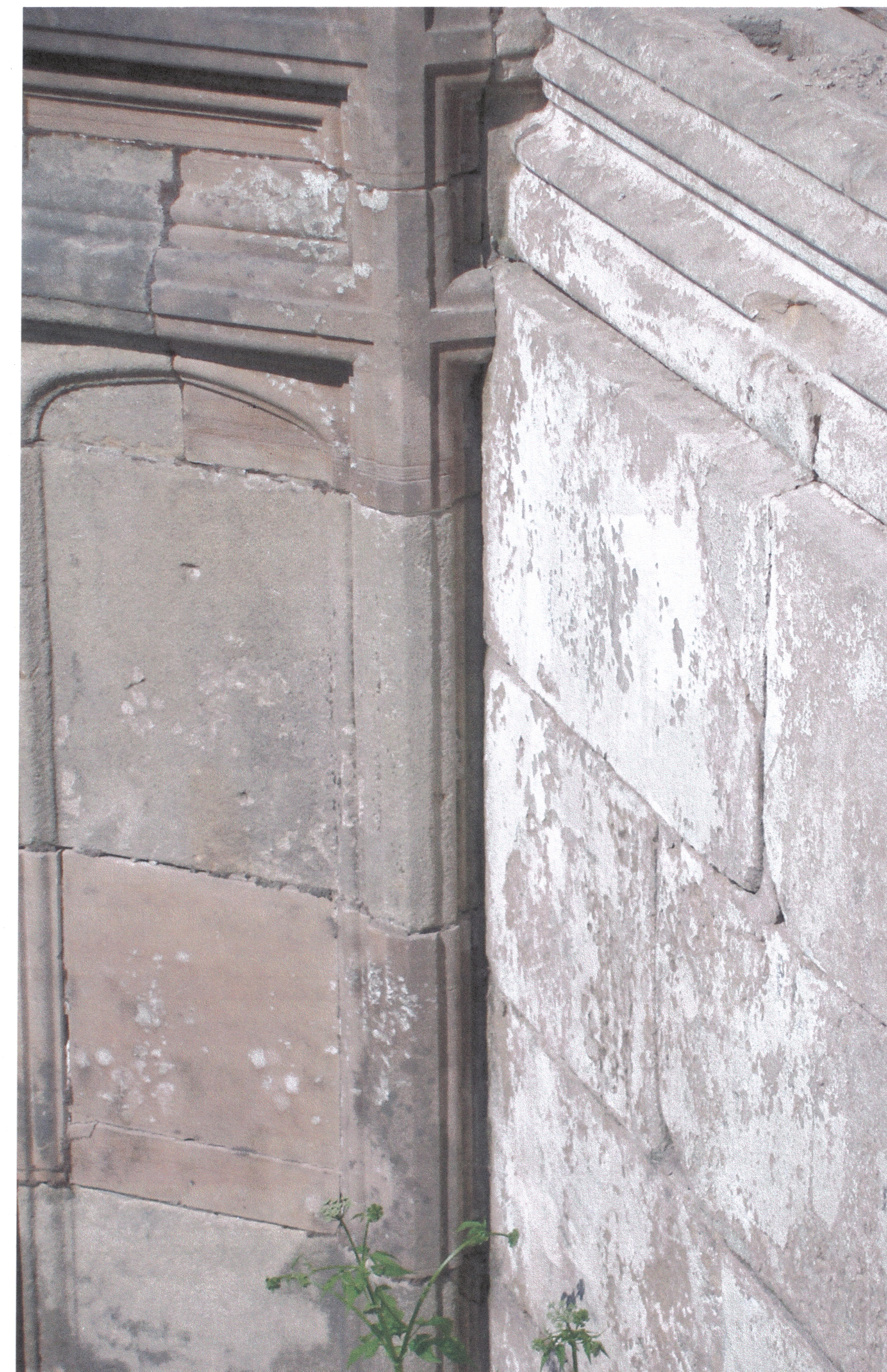
Details of how one of the recycled towers has been incorporated into the new design

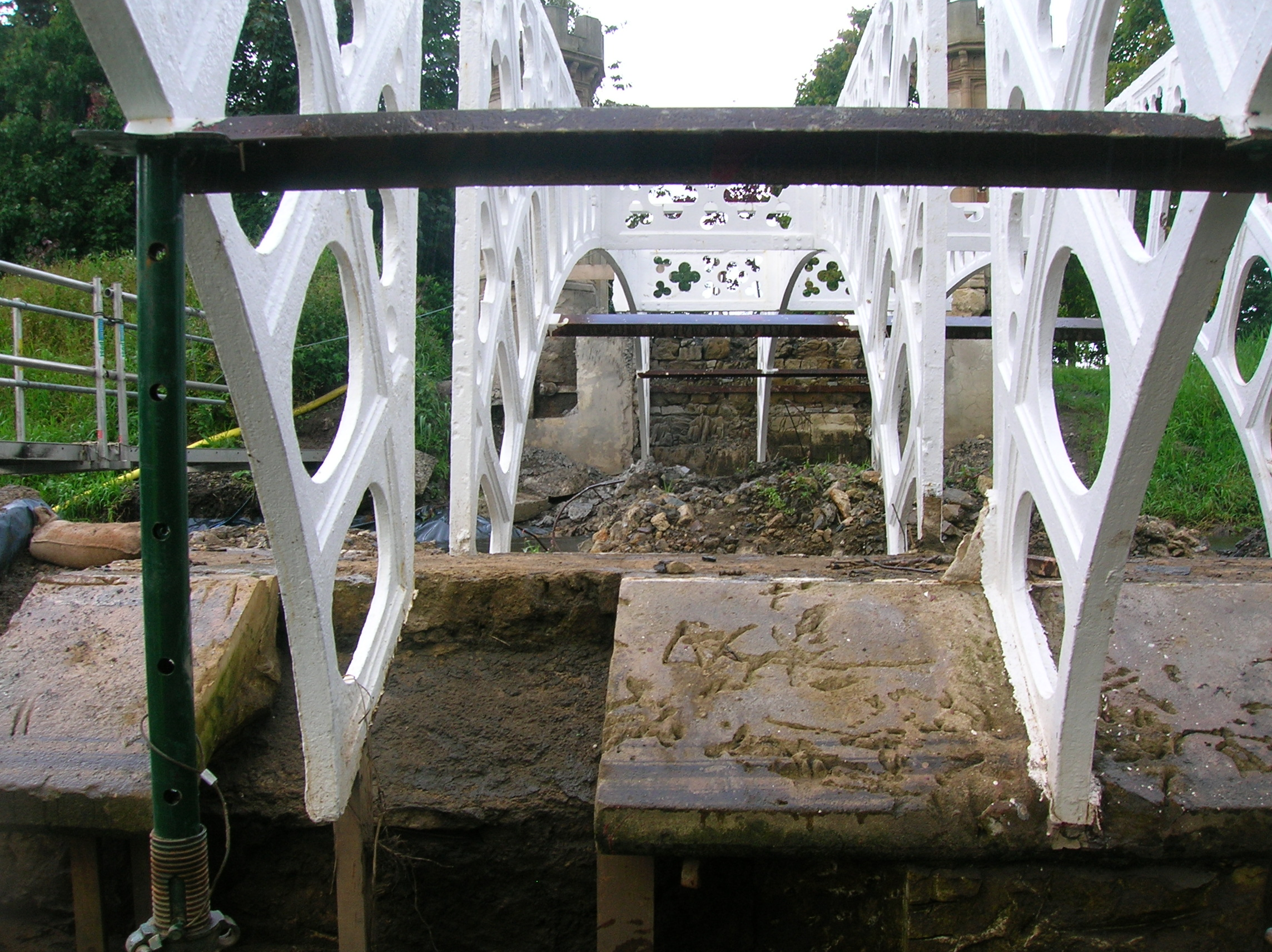
Hydrodemolition damage to the central pier

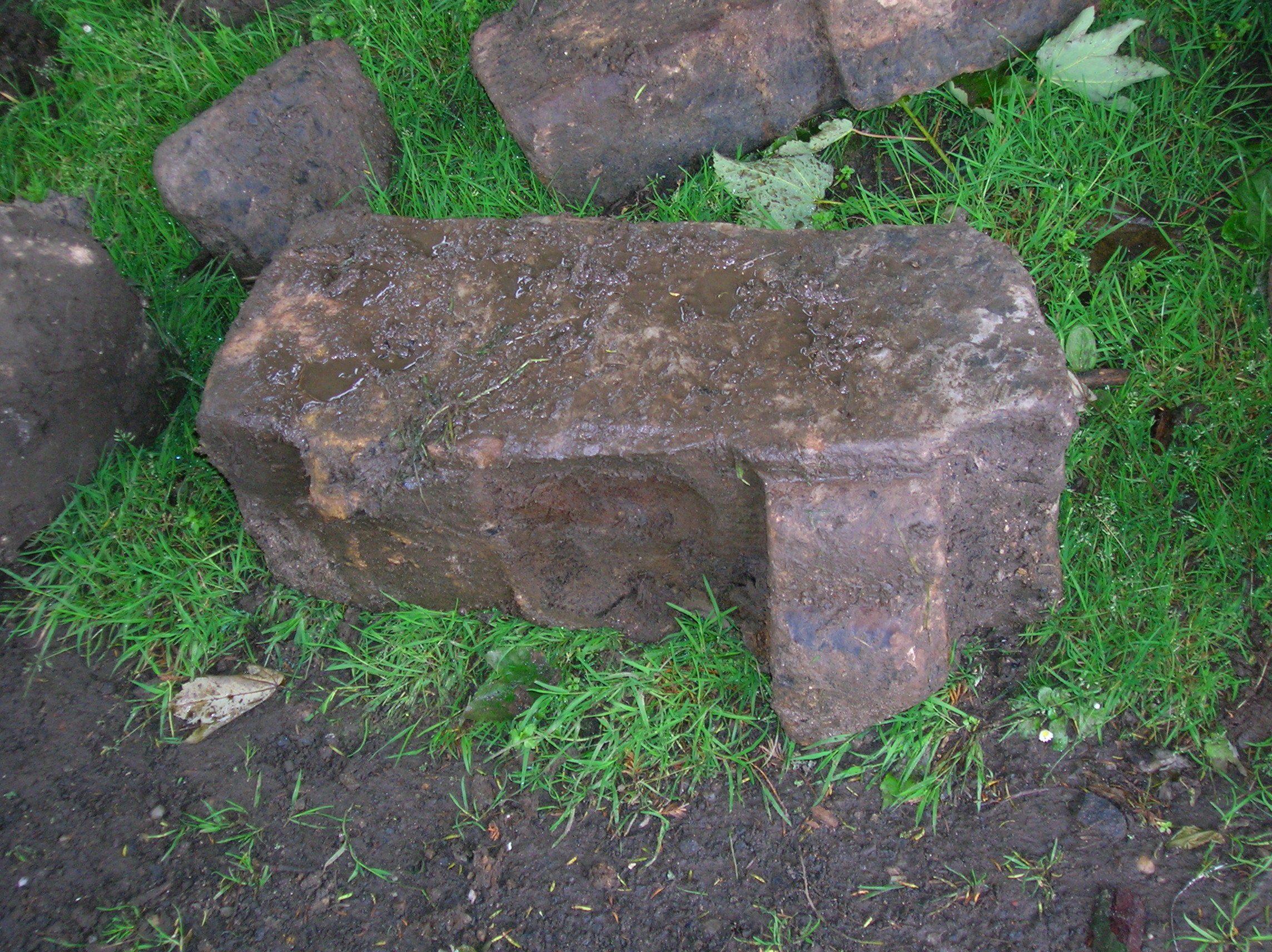
Recycled stones built into the weir beneath the bridge. One has the remains of two corbels and may well have come from the pre-1802 medieval castle.

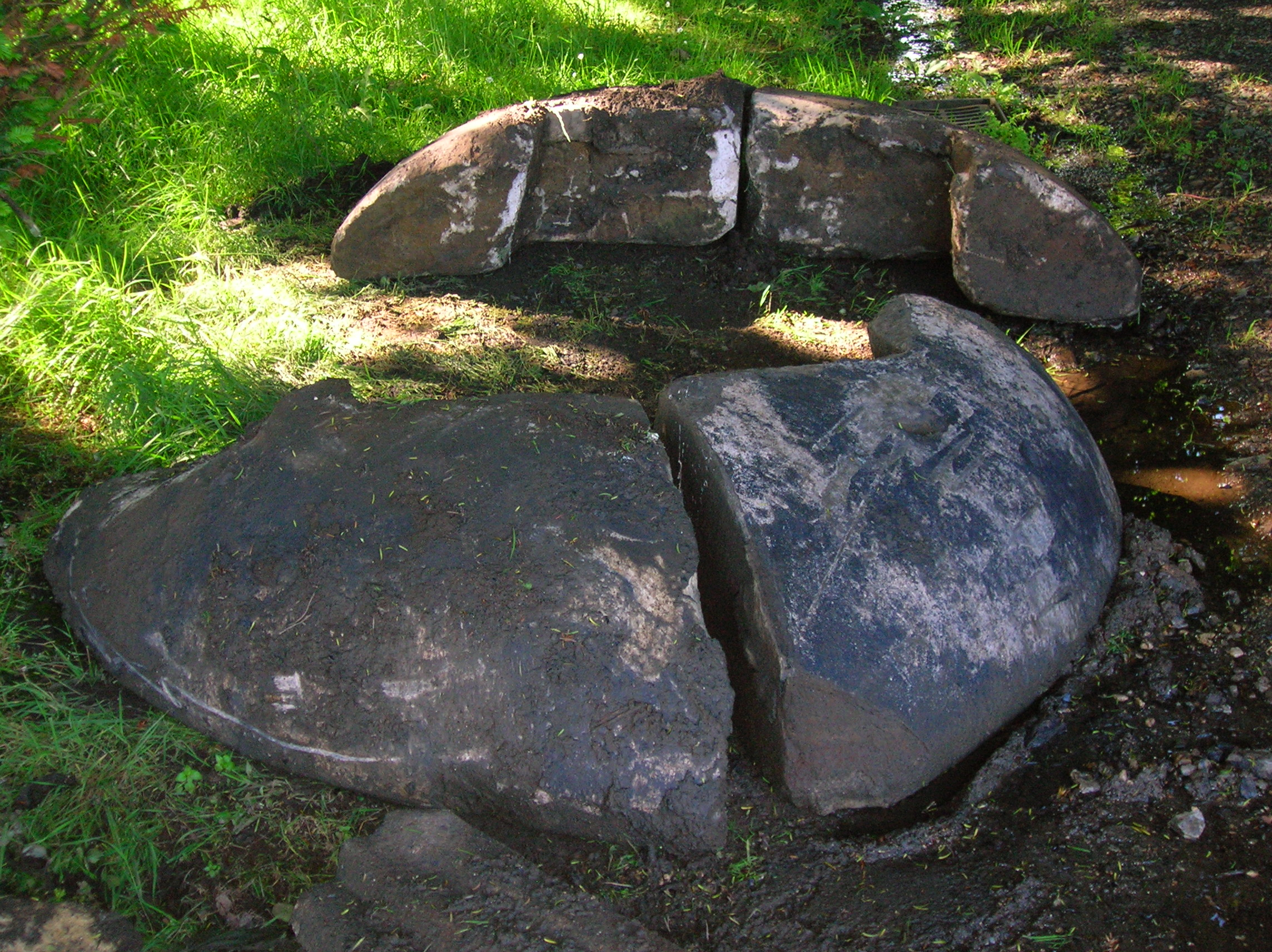
A cut-water, probably from the 'old bridge' as it does not 'fit' and it was apparently abandoned near the 'new bridge'

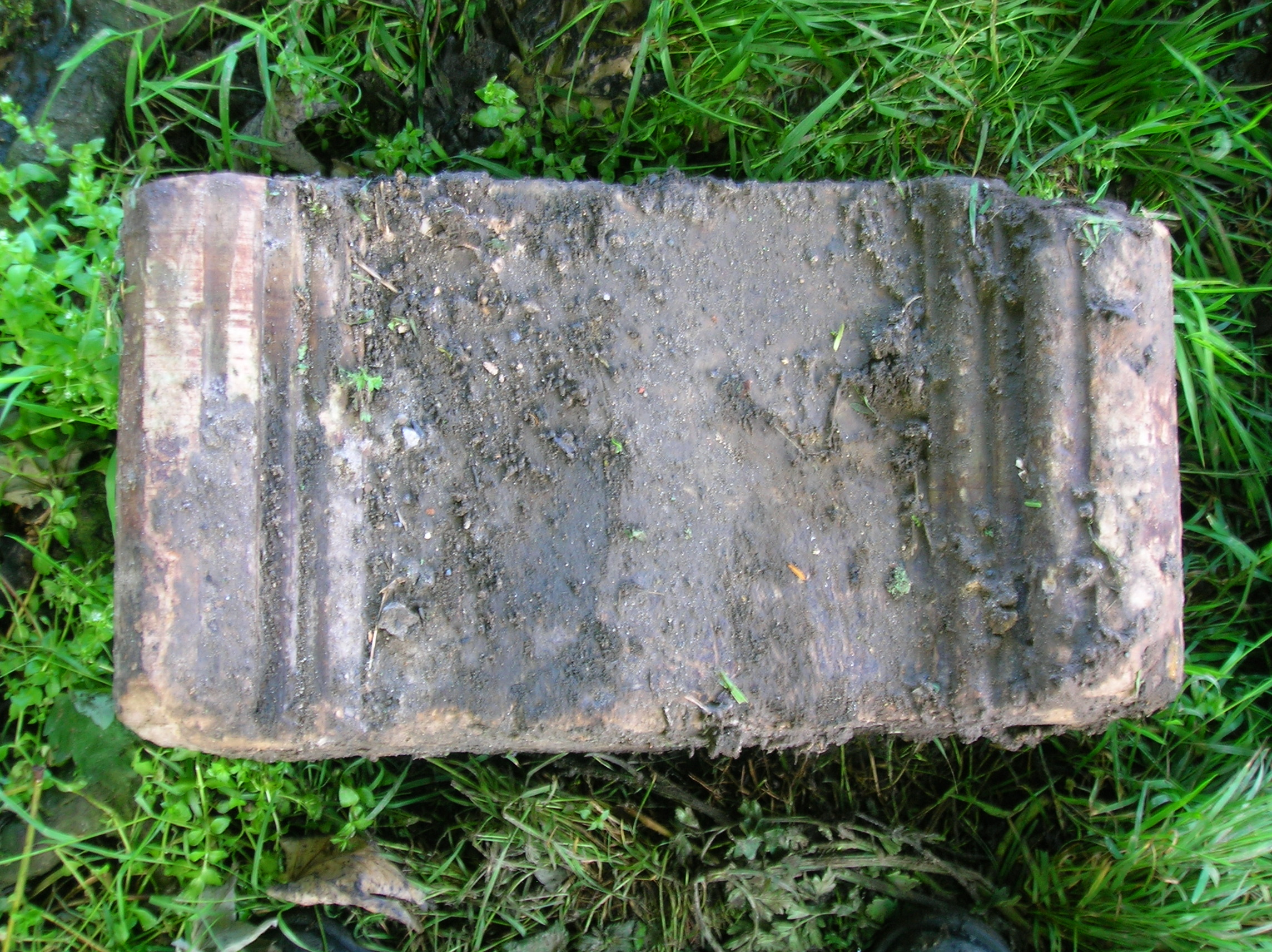
A section of an 'old' bridge tower used in the weir

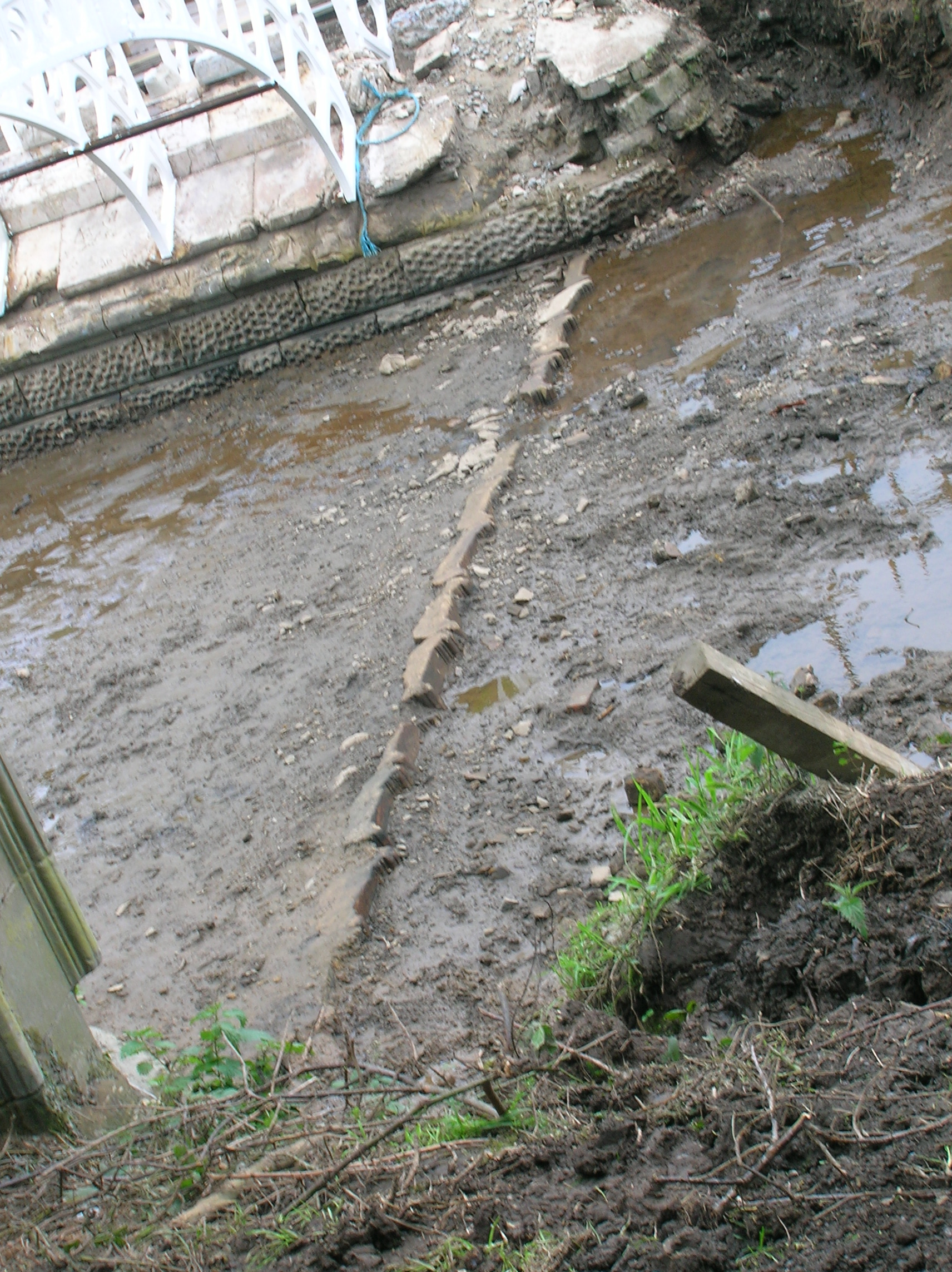
The weir made from sections of the old large 'towers'

== The Tournament Bridge and WWII ==
The Eglinton Castle Estate was requisitioned during World War II and during this occupation the Tournament Bridge partly collapsed, partly due to alterations which had been made earlier by the Eglinton Estate, involving supposed strengthening using brickwork, as revealed during the 2008 restoration work. The old bridge partly collapsed in early 1936, the cast-iron fascias and central pinnacles falling outwards.

To save the bridge from total collapse the 103rd (Glasgow) Company Royal Engineers, who were encamped on the Irvine Moor, removed the cast-iron outer fascia coverings and the pinnacles, encasing the remaining cast-iron arches in concrete as can be seen from contemporary photographs and as further revealed during restoration work. It is not known what happened to the pinnacles and cast-iron coverings. It had been thought that they were safely in storage, however enquiries have led to nothing. The soldiers in 1936 were at their annual camp and the repair section were commanded by Lieut R. J. P. Cowan and Sergeant David Borland.

=== Repair work ===
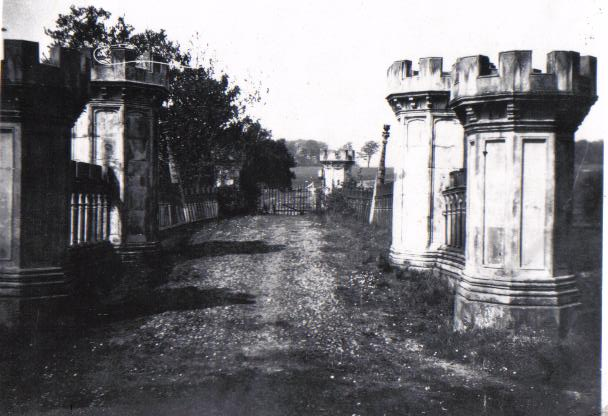
A view across the damaged bridge

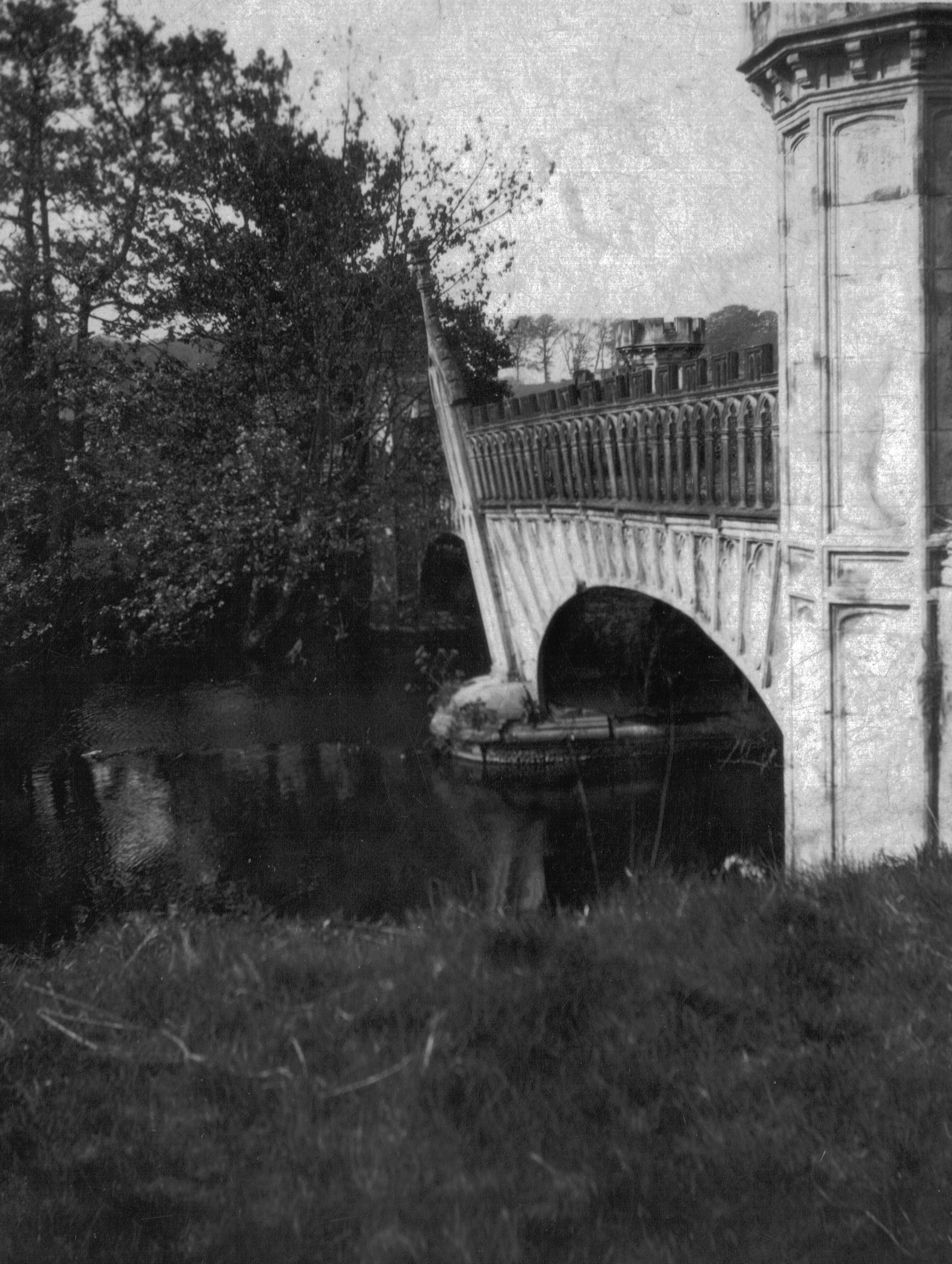
A view showing the partial collapse of the bridge

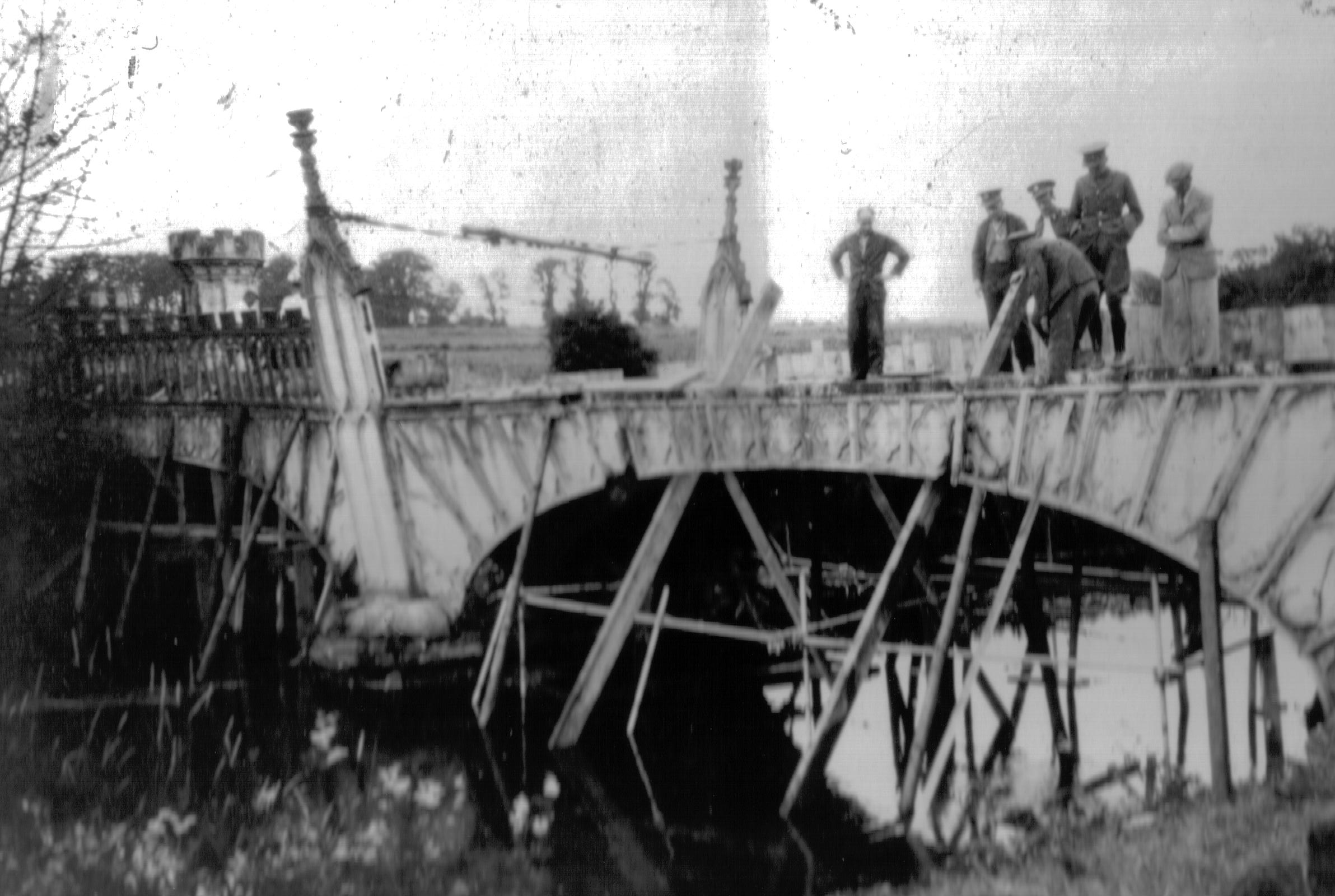
The bridge with temporary supports

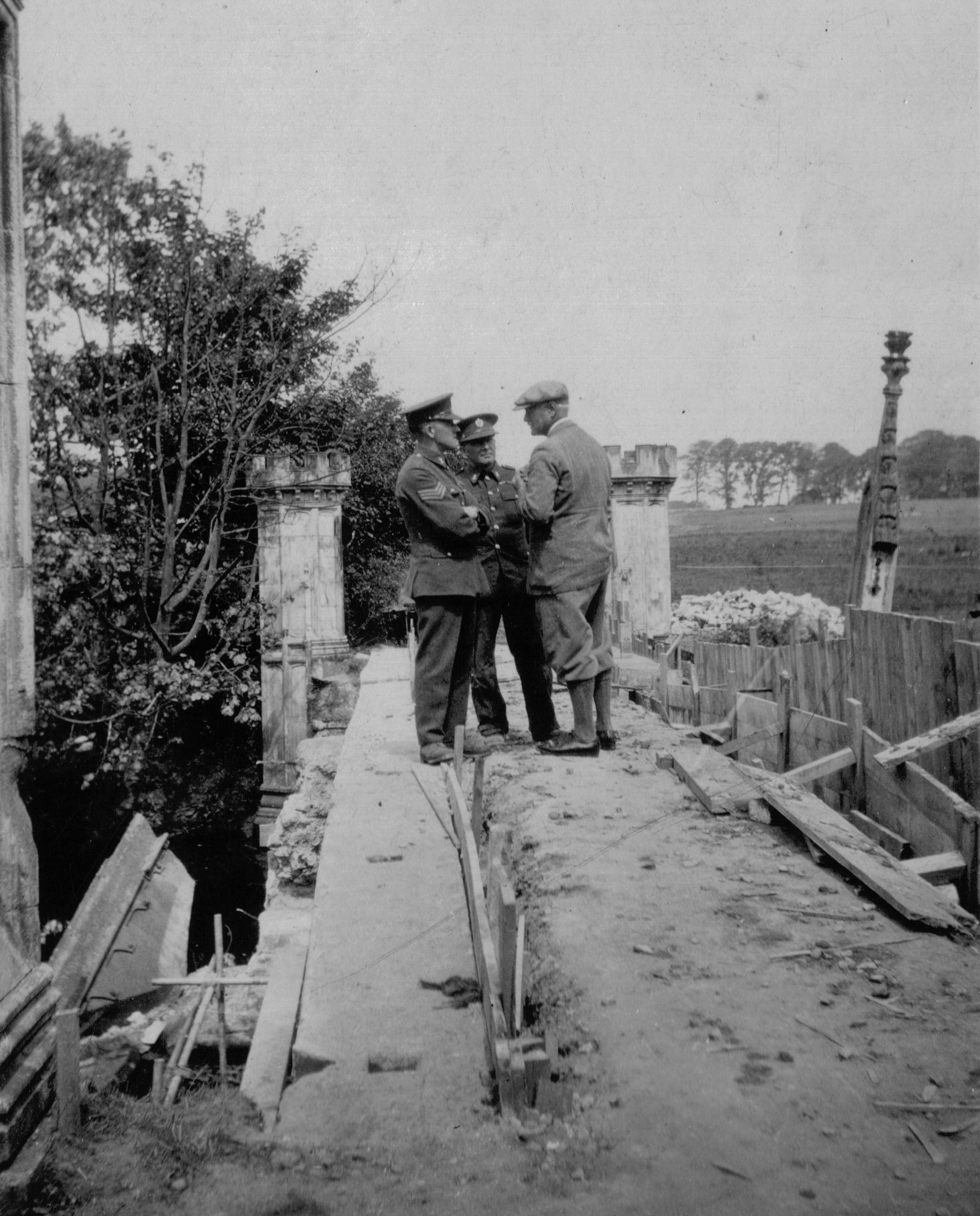
Repair work underway, showing the shuttering for the concrete

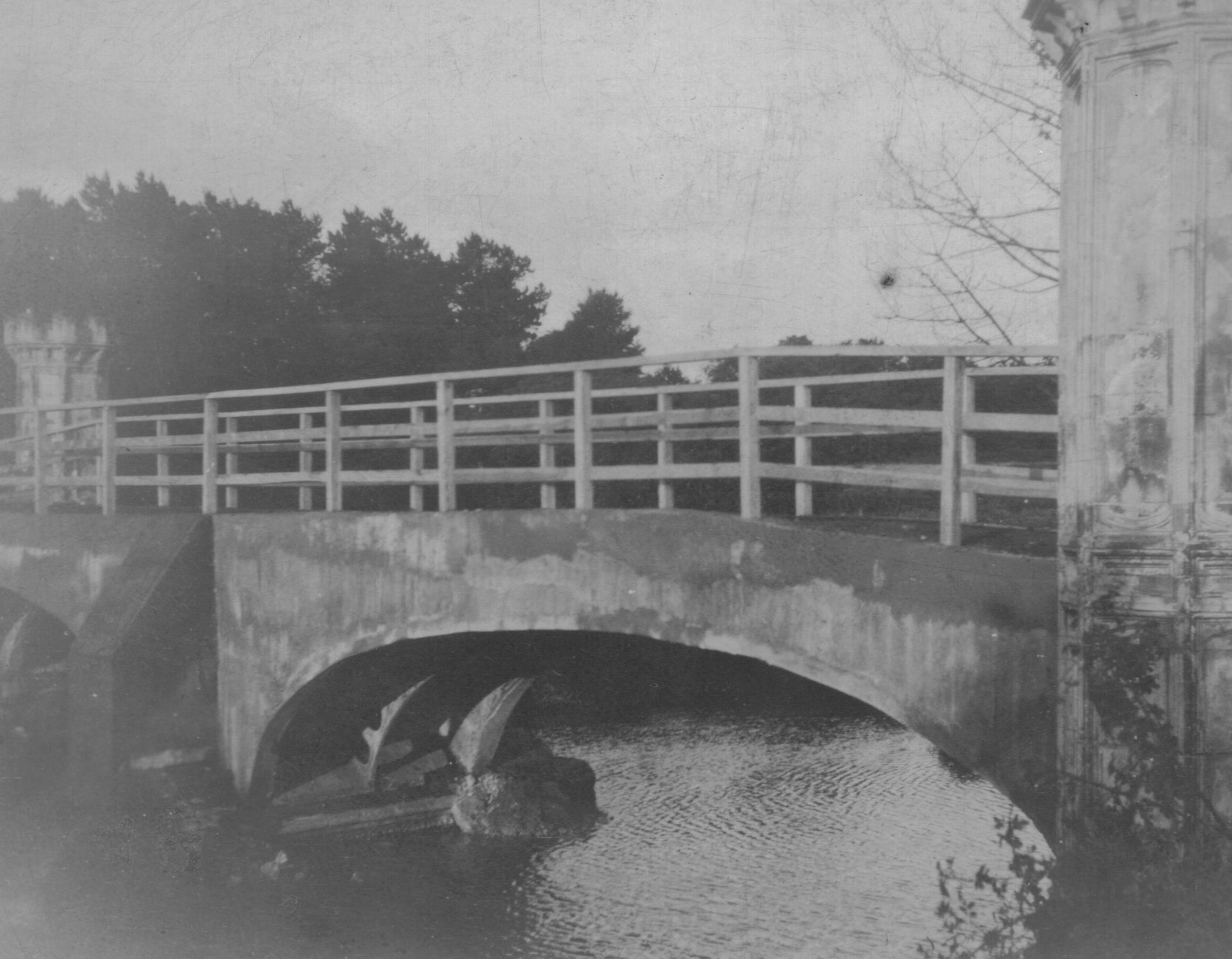
The repaired bridge. Note the simple wooden handrail and the remaining exposed iron arch.

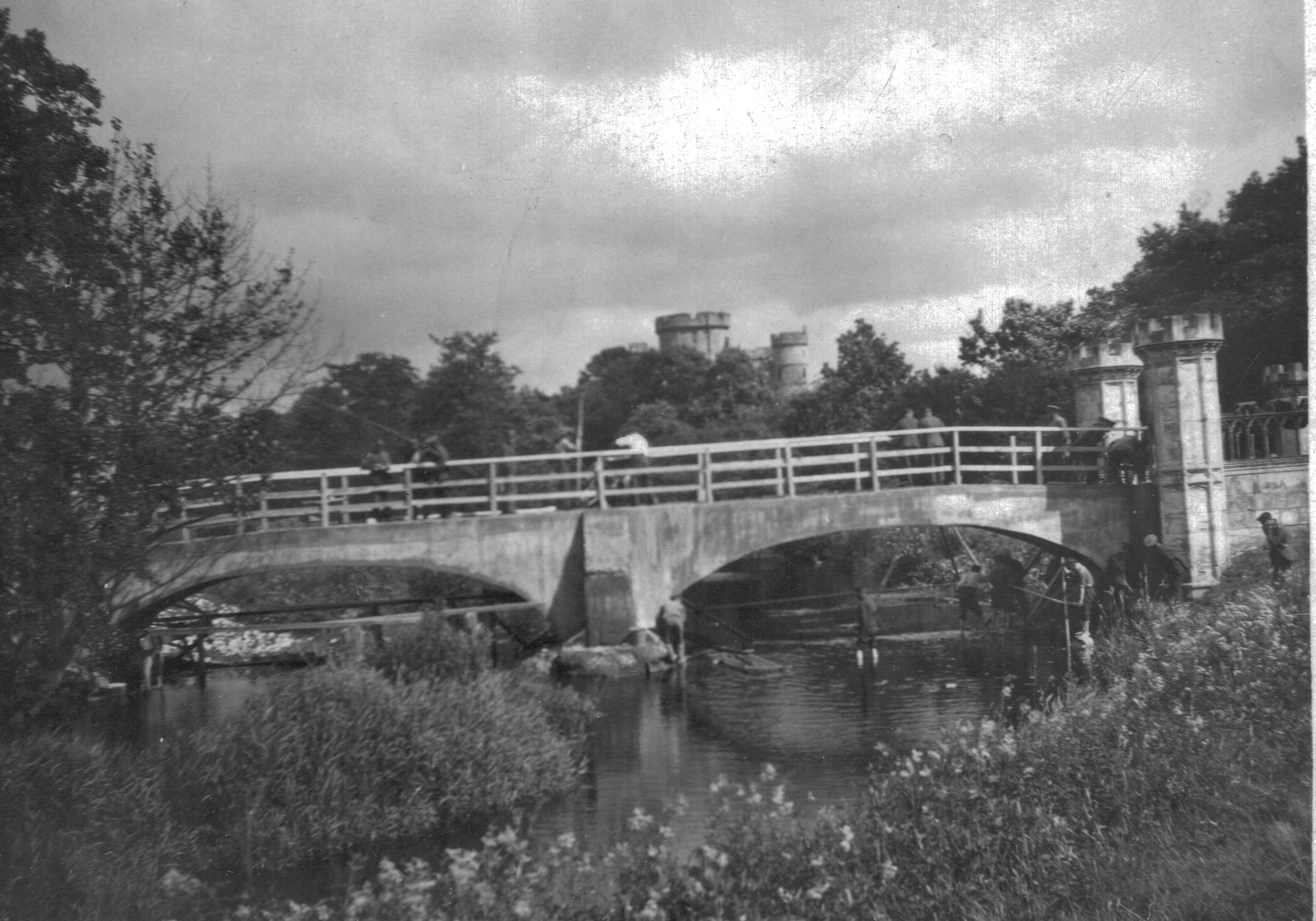
A view of the whole of the repaired bridge. Note the army personnel, children fishing, etc.

== Other estate bridges ==
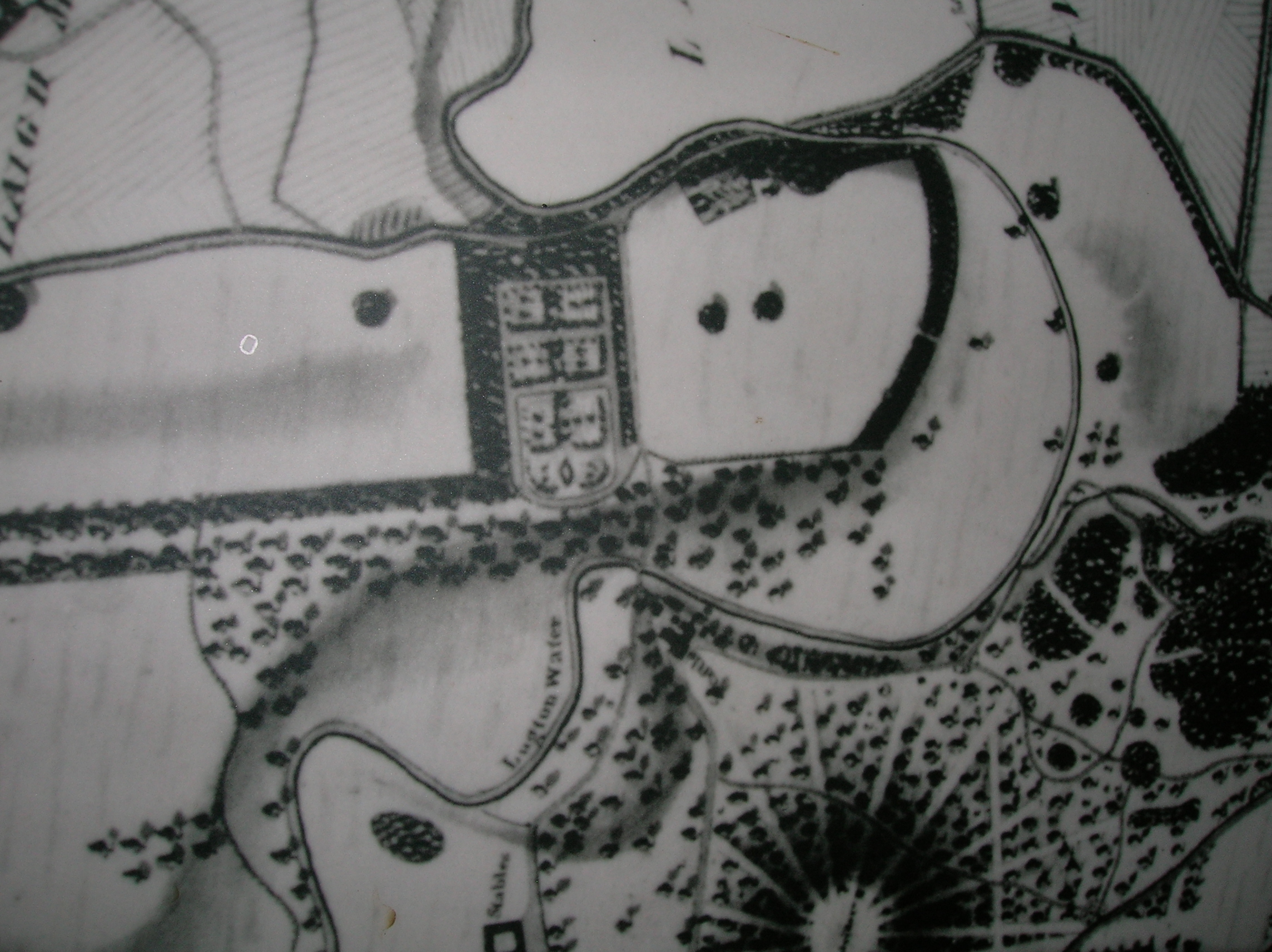
John Ainslie's 1790 map showing pleasure garden on the opposite side of the Lugton Water to the castle in what became part of the deer park

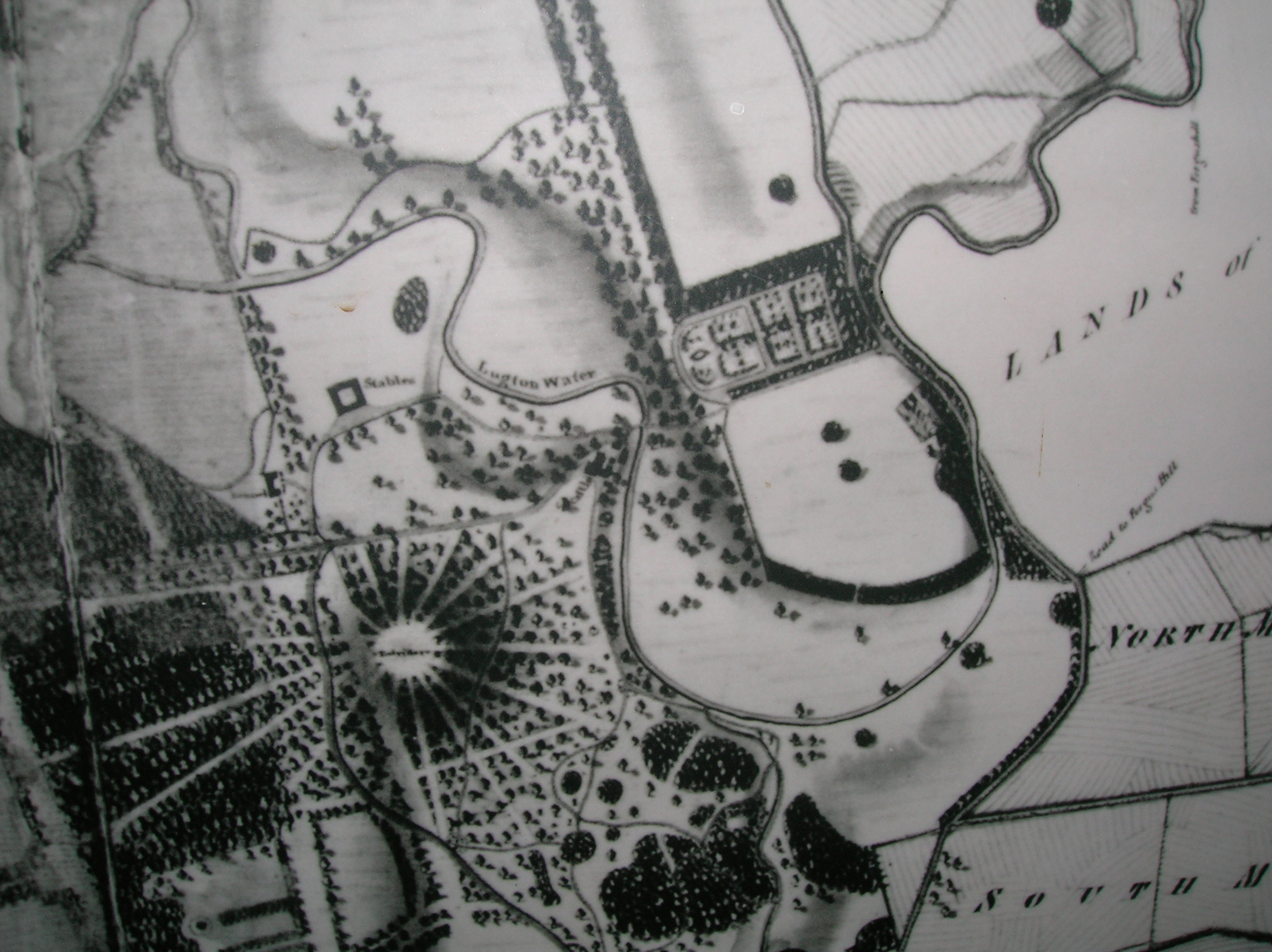
John Ainslie's 1790 map showing pleasure garden on the opposite side of the Lugton Water to the castle in what became part of the deer park

Originally the river would have been crossed by simple fords, however by the 18th century ornamental pleasure gardens had been formed and these were partly situated in what later became the deer park. No signs of these gardens are now visible, apart from Crop marks on aerial photographs taken around the end of the Second World War. A bridge was necessary to give access to the ornamental gardens and one is indicated on John Ainslie's map dated 1790, crossing the Lugton Water close to the castle itself. A small wooden bridge across the Lugton Water is shown in an illustration from around 1815, however this may not have been across the Lugton Water. Thomson's map of 1828 (See illustration) indicates a bridge crossing the Lugton Water at the castle where the three arched bridge was and a drive starting off at the position of the present day bridge, which may have been a ford at the time. Another bridge is suggested further upstream and close to the castle.

A wooden 'Laundry Bridge' stood close to the castle and downstream from it was second wooden bridge which was washed away in a storm in 1938. Local children used it to build rafts. An 1807 estate map shows a bridge cutting across to a larder and another bridge just downstream, linked to the network of formal paths.

William Roy's 1747–55 map showing a bridge only upstream of the castle, roughly where Thomson also shows a bridge in his 1828 map.

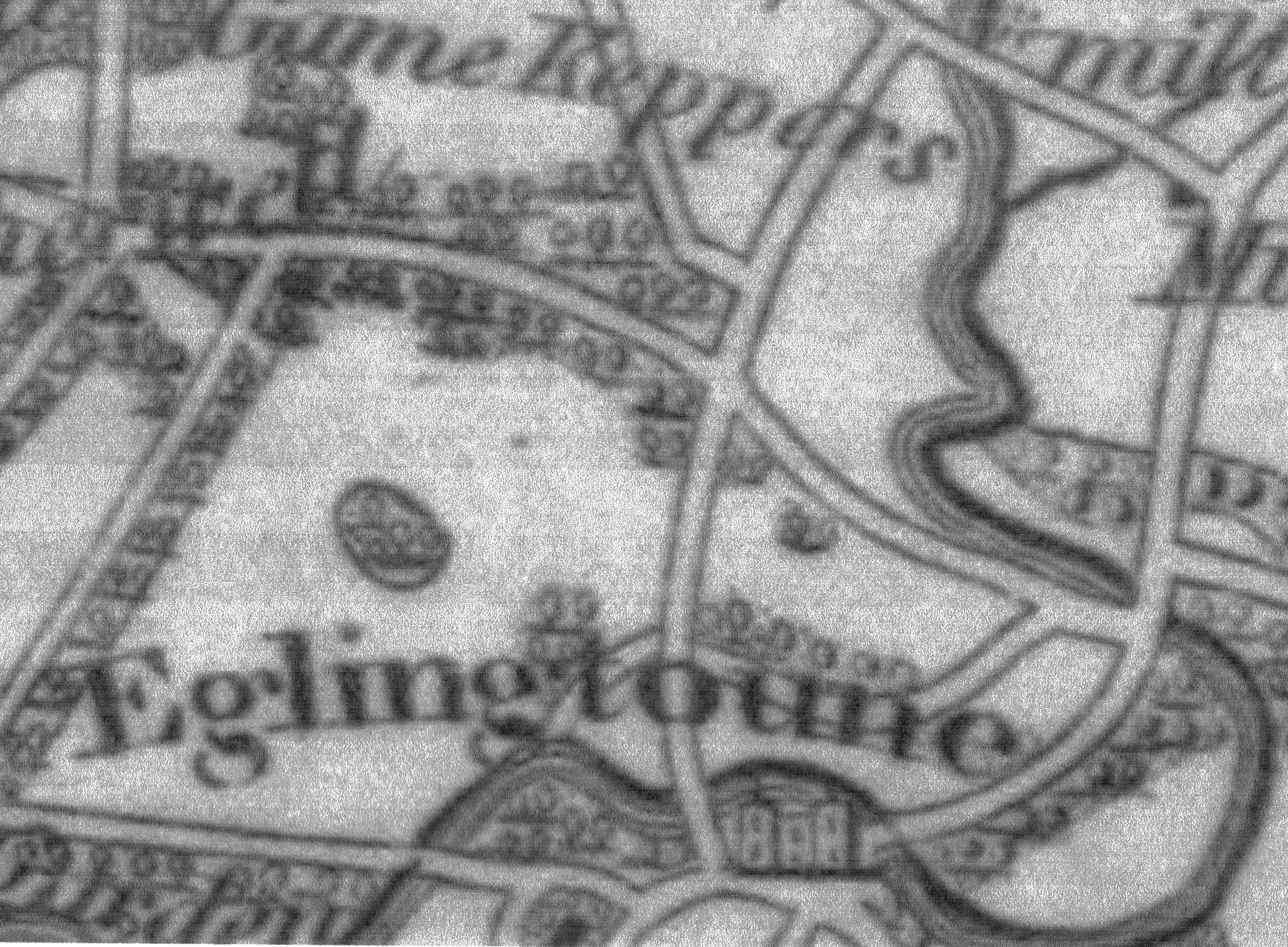
John Thomson's 1828 map showing the position of the old Tournamaent bridge. Here a drive and a possible building are located at the site of the 'new' Tournament Bridge.

The restored Stables Bridge, also called Lady Jane's Bridge, lies on the Kilwinning Lodge drive and just downstream from it stood an elegant cast-iron bridge with a 50-foot span. This cast-iron bridge had high-quality stonework on both of the abutments, much of which survives. This bridge gave access to the kitchen walled gardens and glasshouse ranges and lasted into the mid-1940s when the army removed it.

The suspension bridge built by the army in the 1980s on behalf of the country park lies just below the weir beside the ruined gazebo. Lady Jane's Cottage had a wooded pedestrian footbridge which is shown in several postcards of the time; however, no clear sign remains apart from elements of the abutment on one bank.

The restored Diamond Bridge lies upstream near the Eglinton Loch and continues to give access to the old Toll Road from Irvine to Kilwinning via Fergushill. This bridge was named after the nearby Black Diamond mine, the spoil heap or bing of which still remains rear the Chapelholm Gate. The colliery name in turn was associated with one of the 13th Earl's favourite horses, Black Diamond.

== Other bridges across the Lugton Water within Eglinton ==
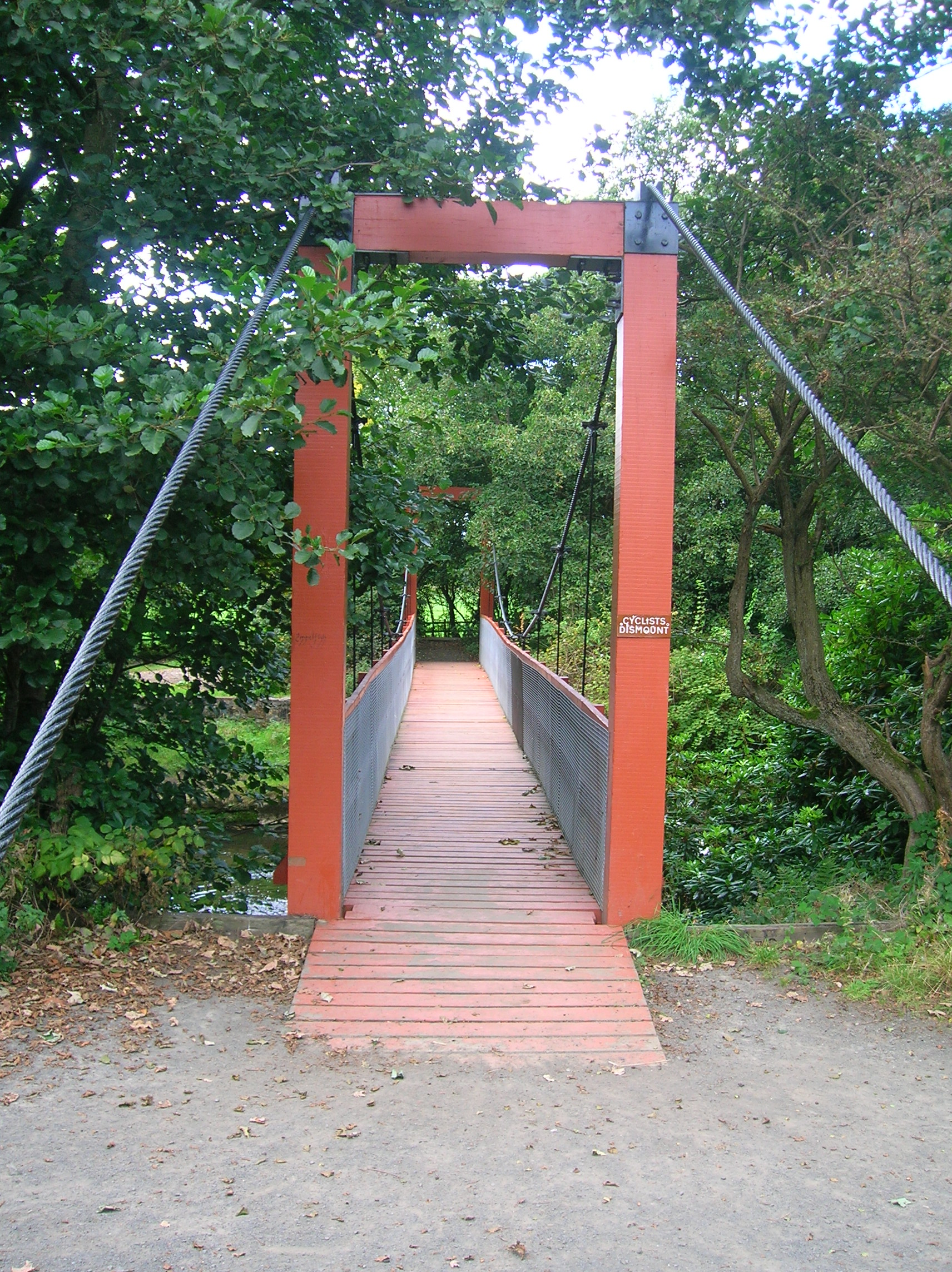
The suspension bridge over the Lugton Water.

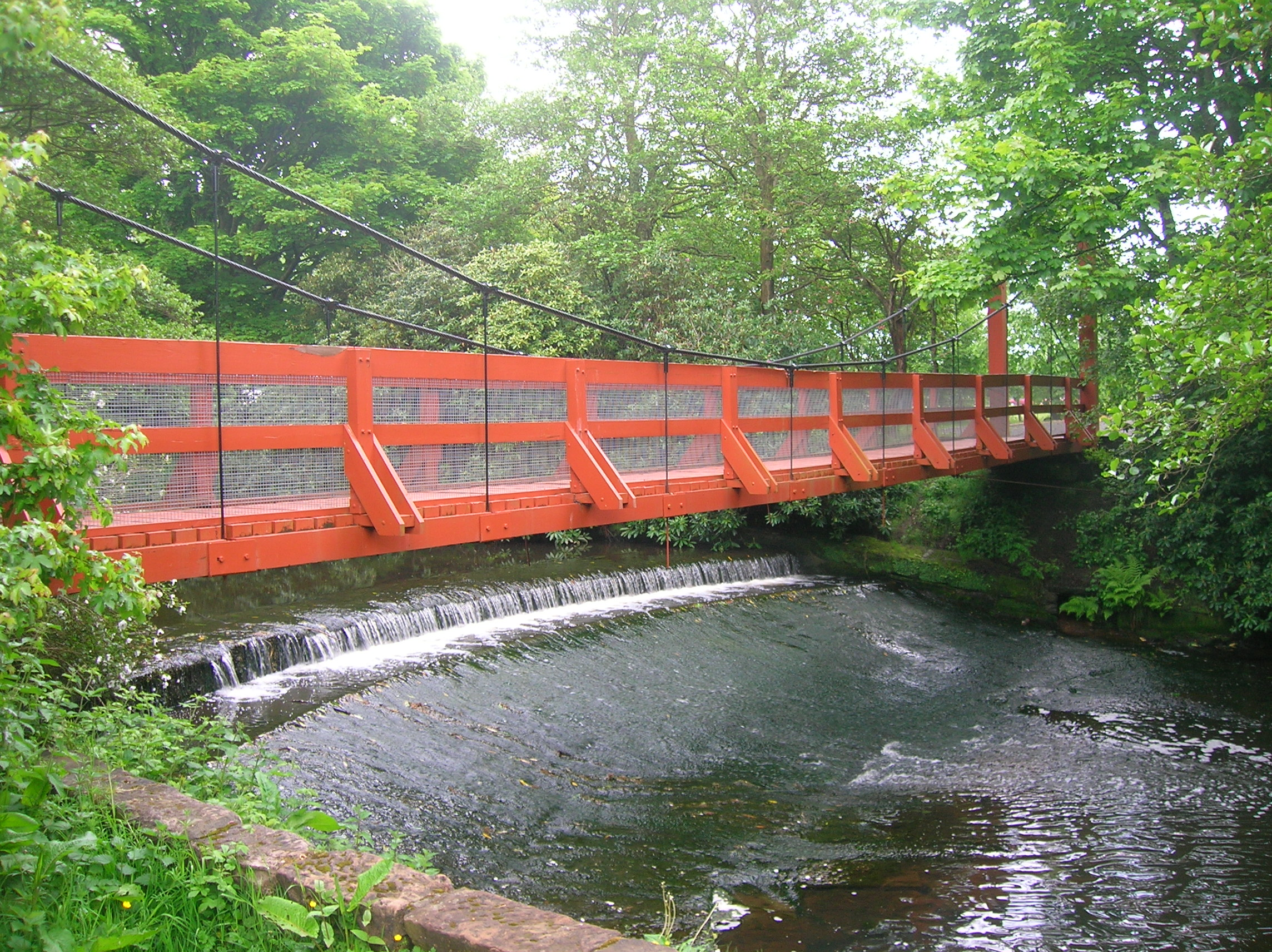
The suspension bridge and cascade weir.

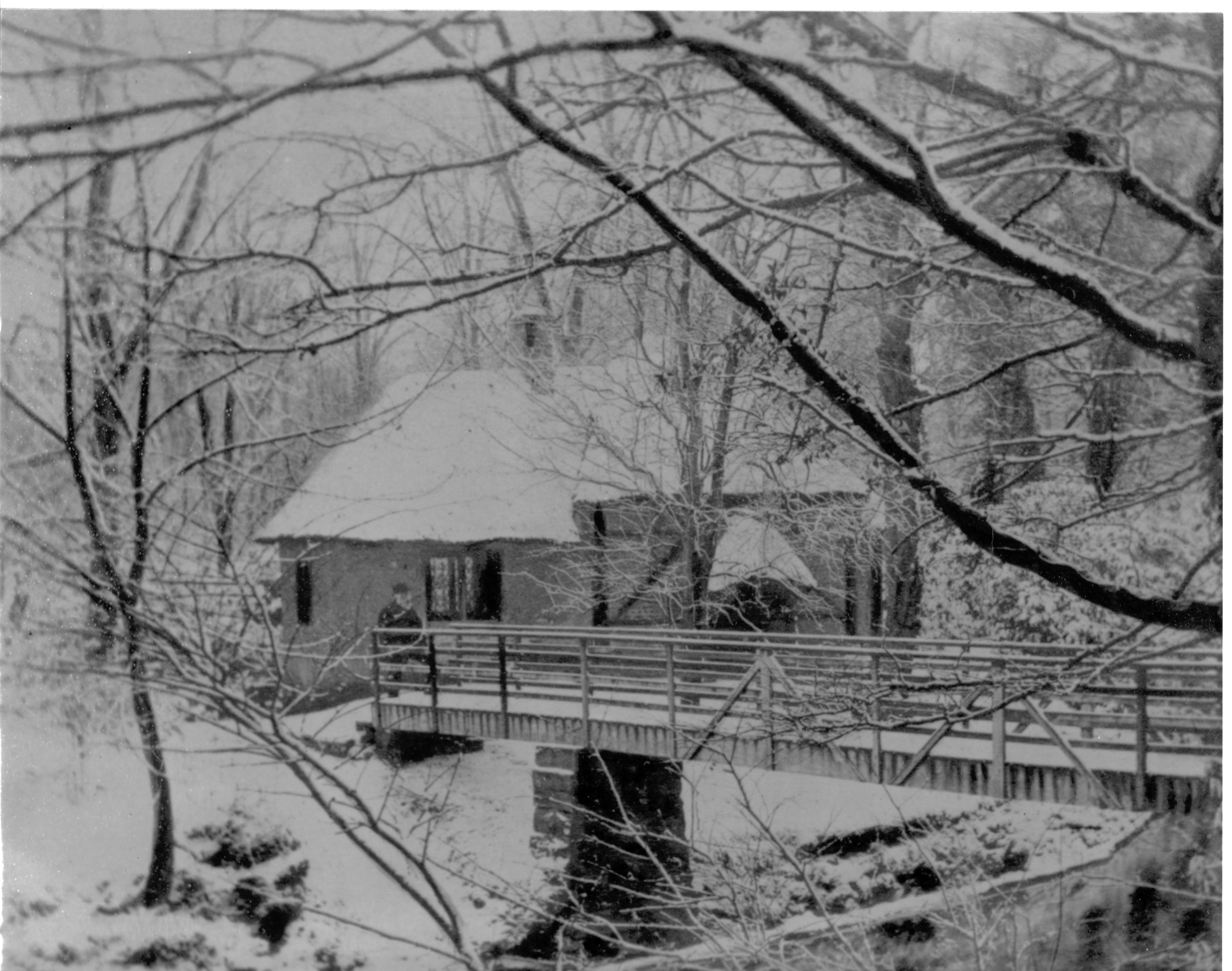
Lady Jane's cottage with its footbridge across the Lugton Water.

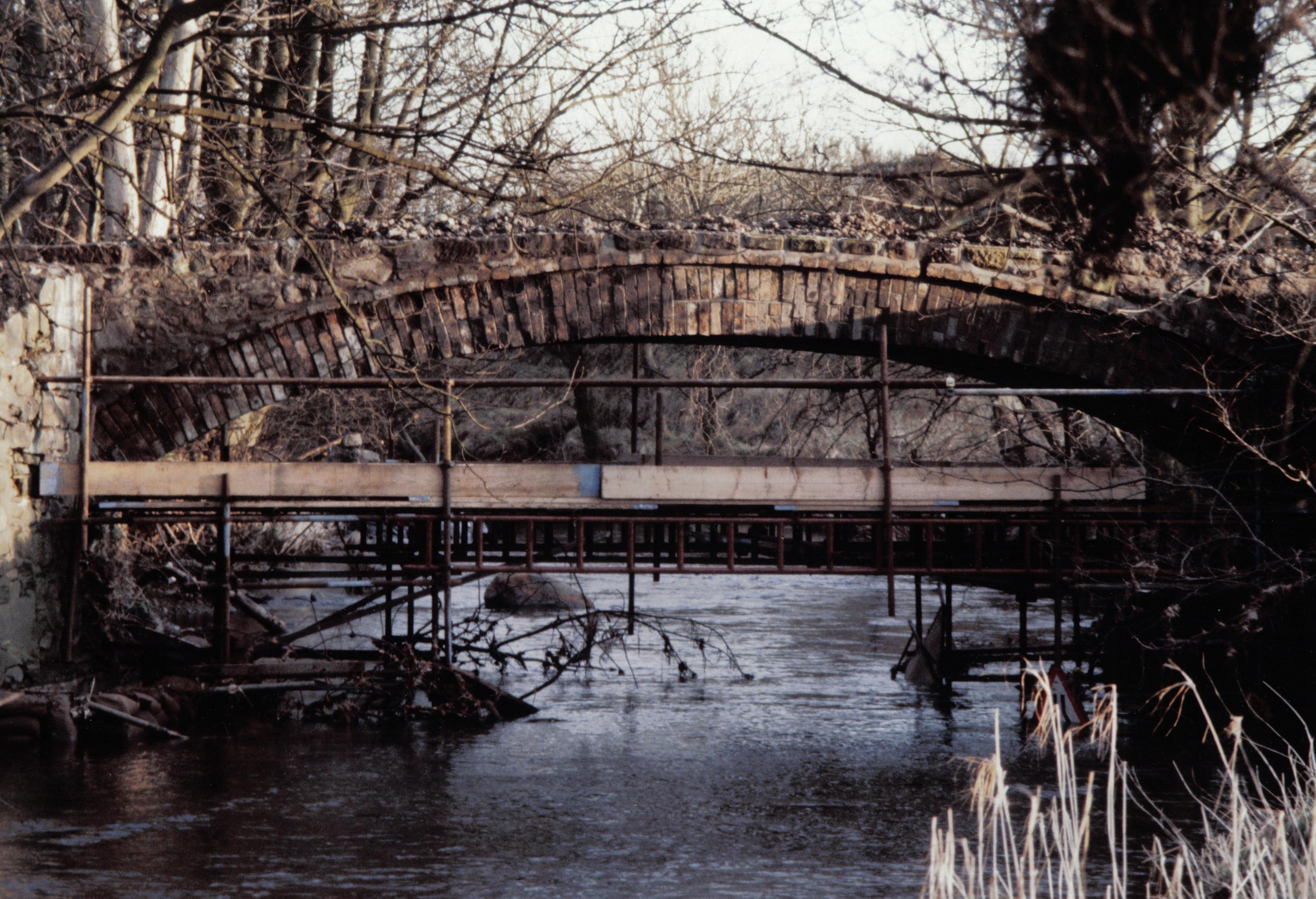
The Diamond Bridge undergoing restoration.

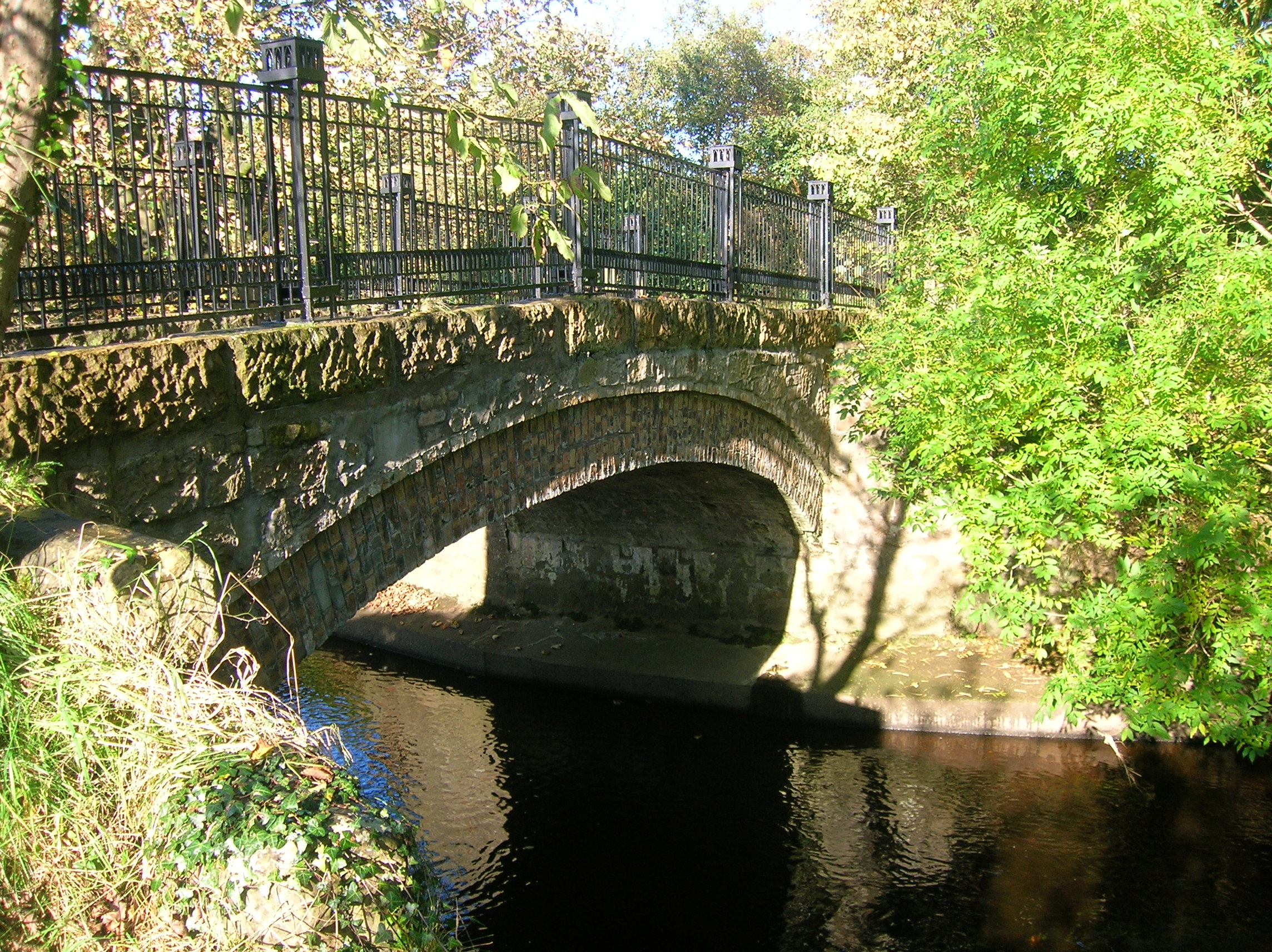
The Chapelholm or 'Diamond' bridge.

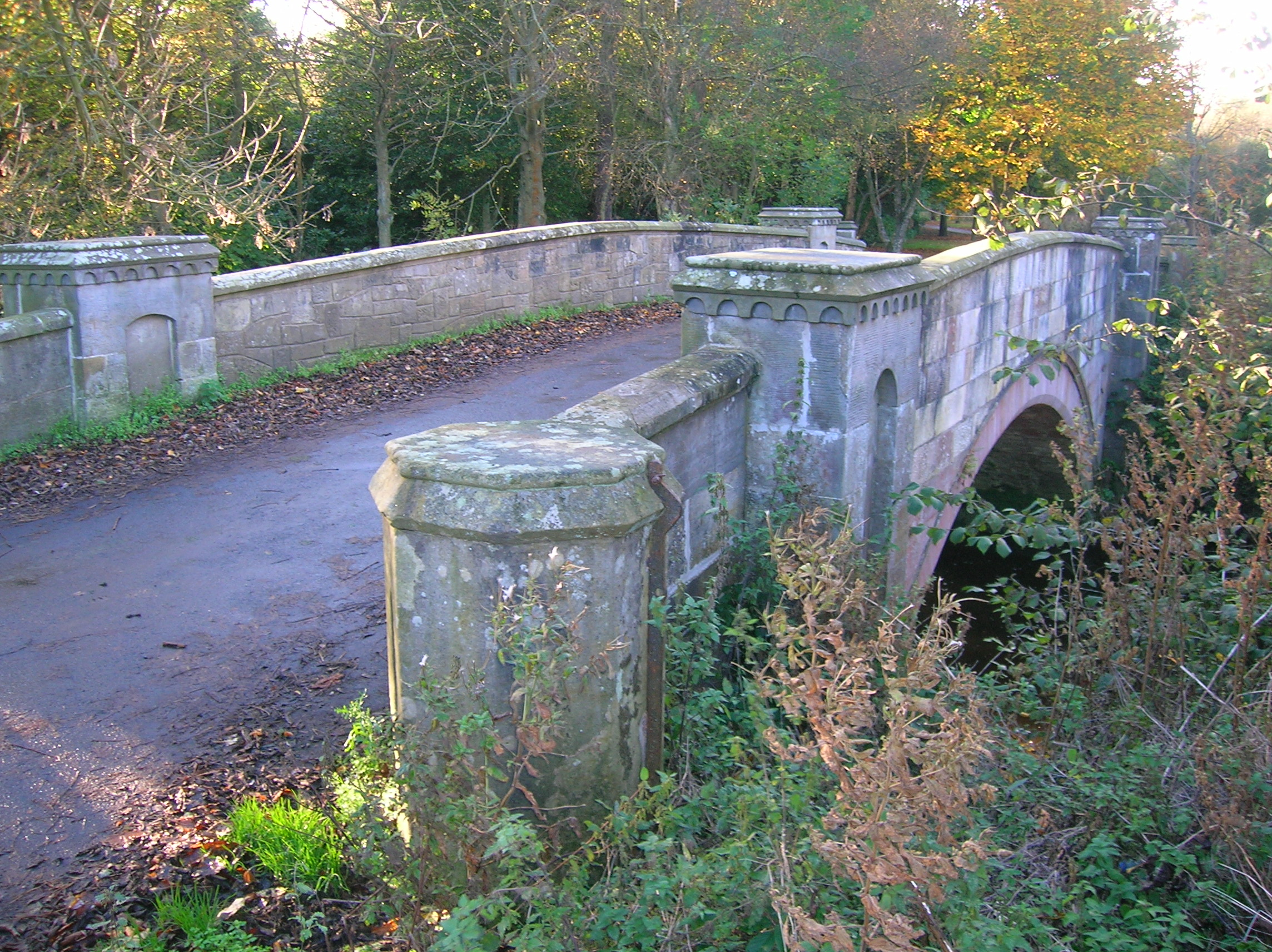
The Stable or Lady Jane's Bridge.

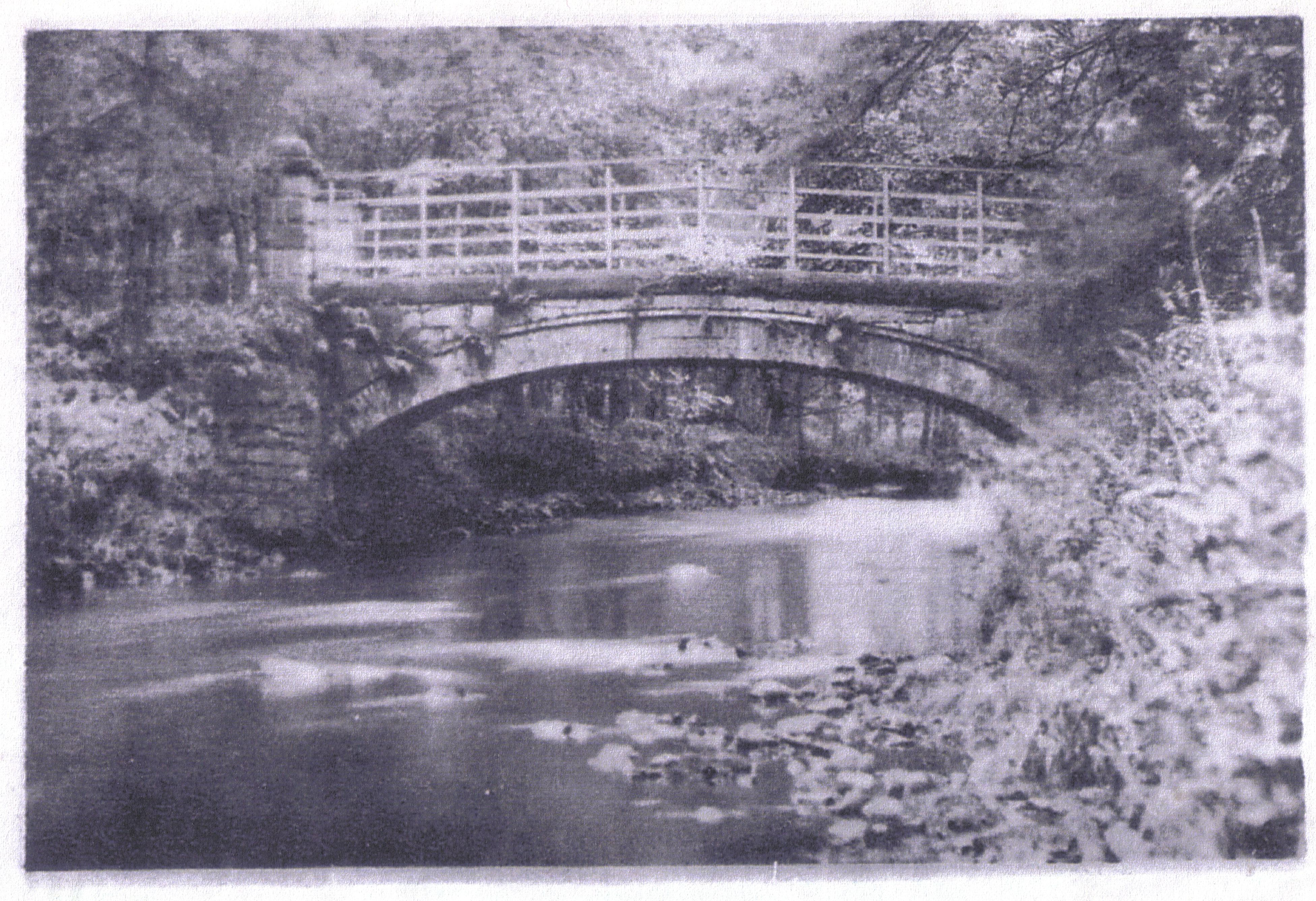
The old Walled Garden Bridge.

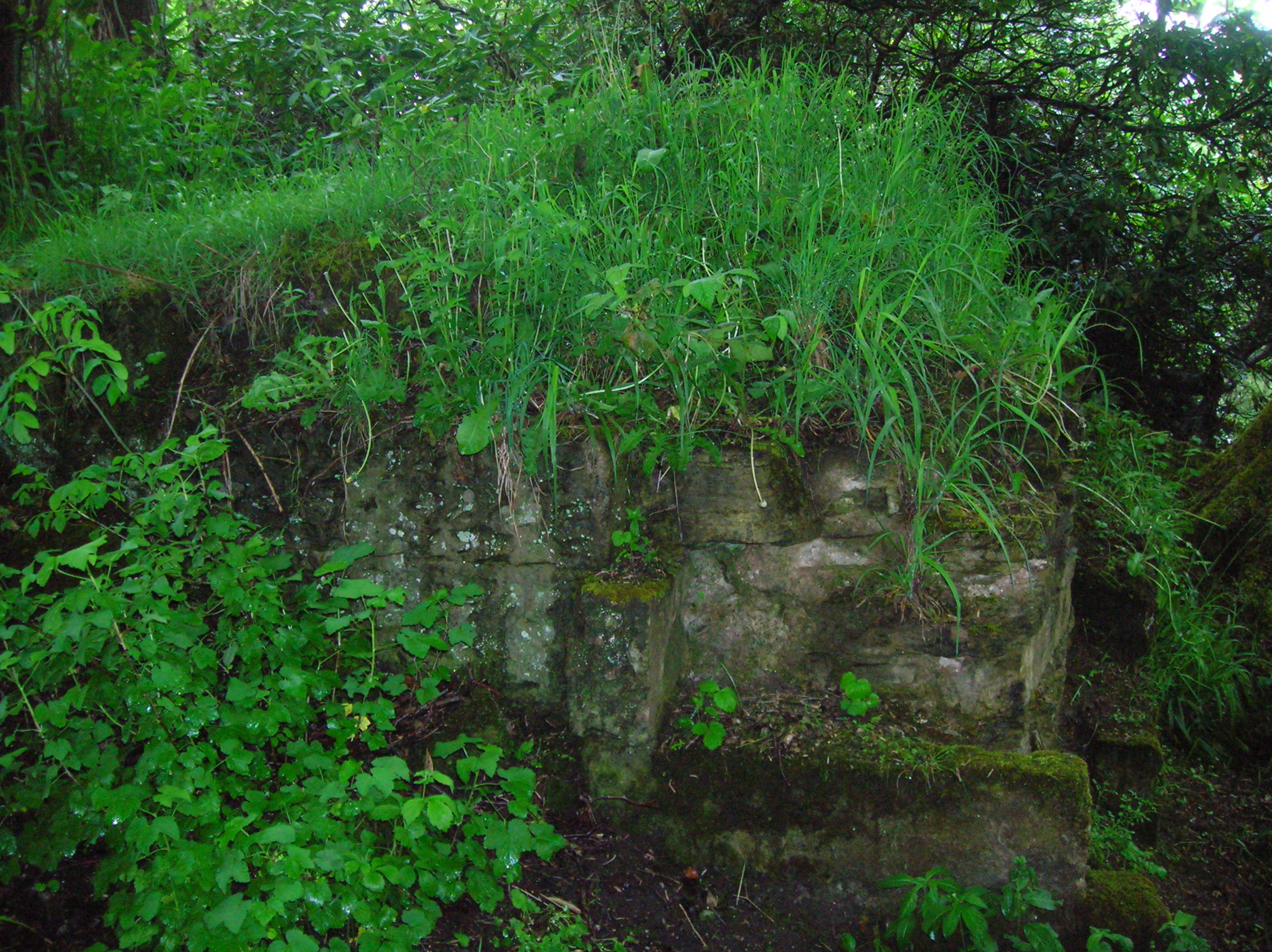
An abutment of the old Walled Garden bridge. Iron work is embedded in the structure, which was faced with high quality vermiculate ashlar stonework.

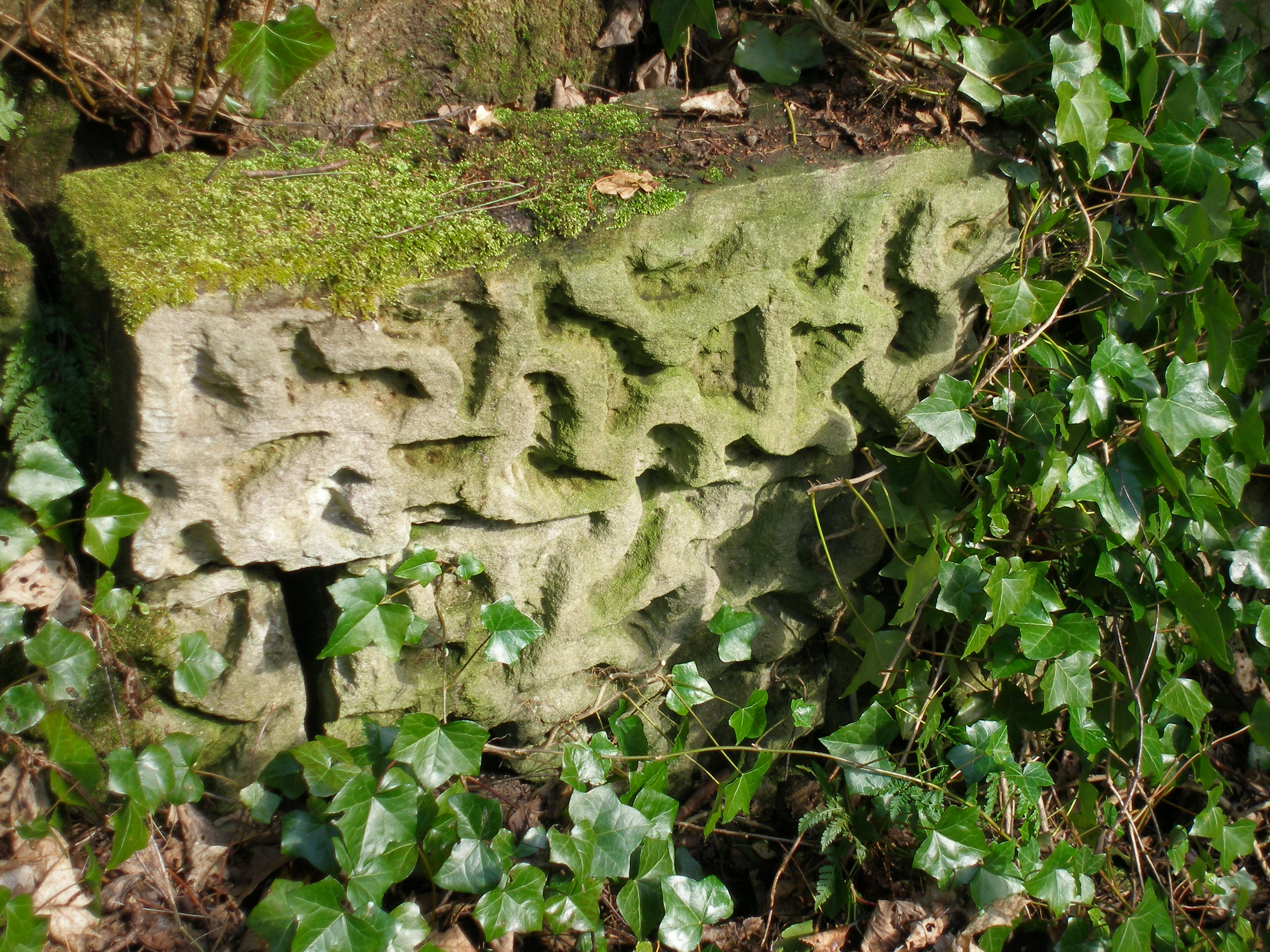
A vermiculate stone from the ornate Walled Garden bridge.

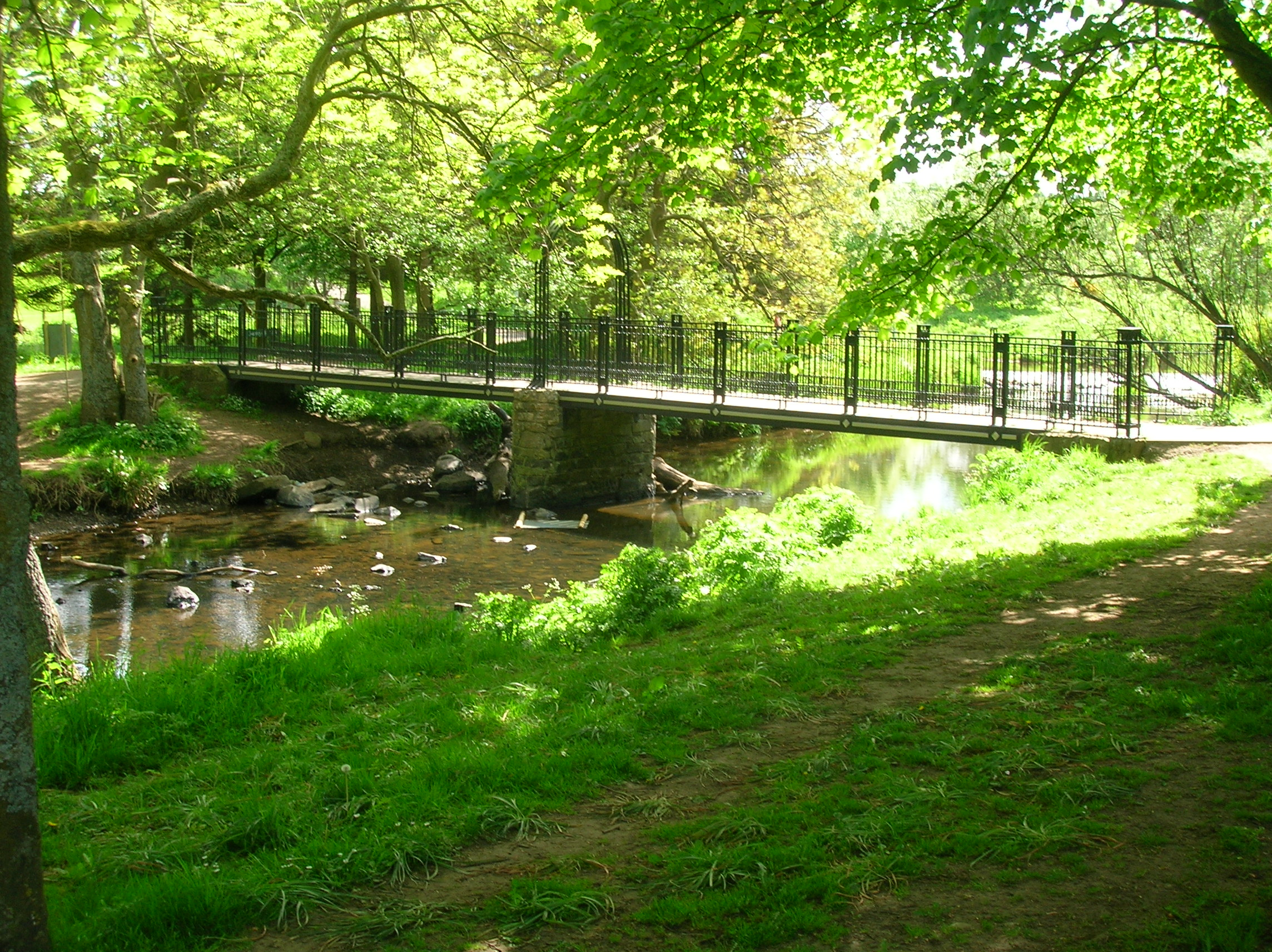
The 'new' castle or Laundry footbridge.

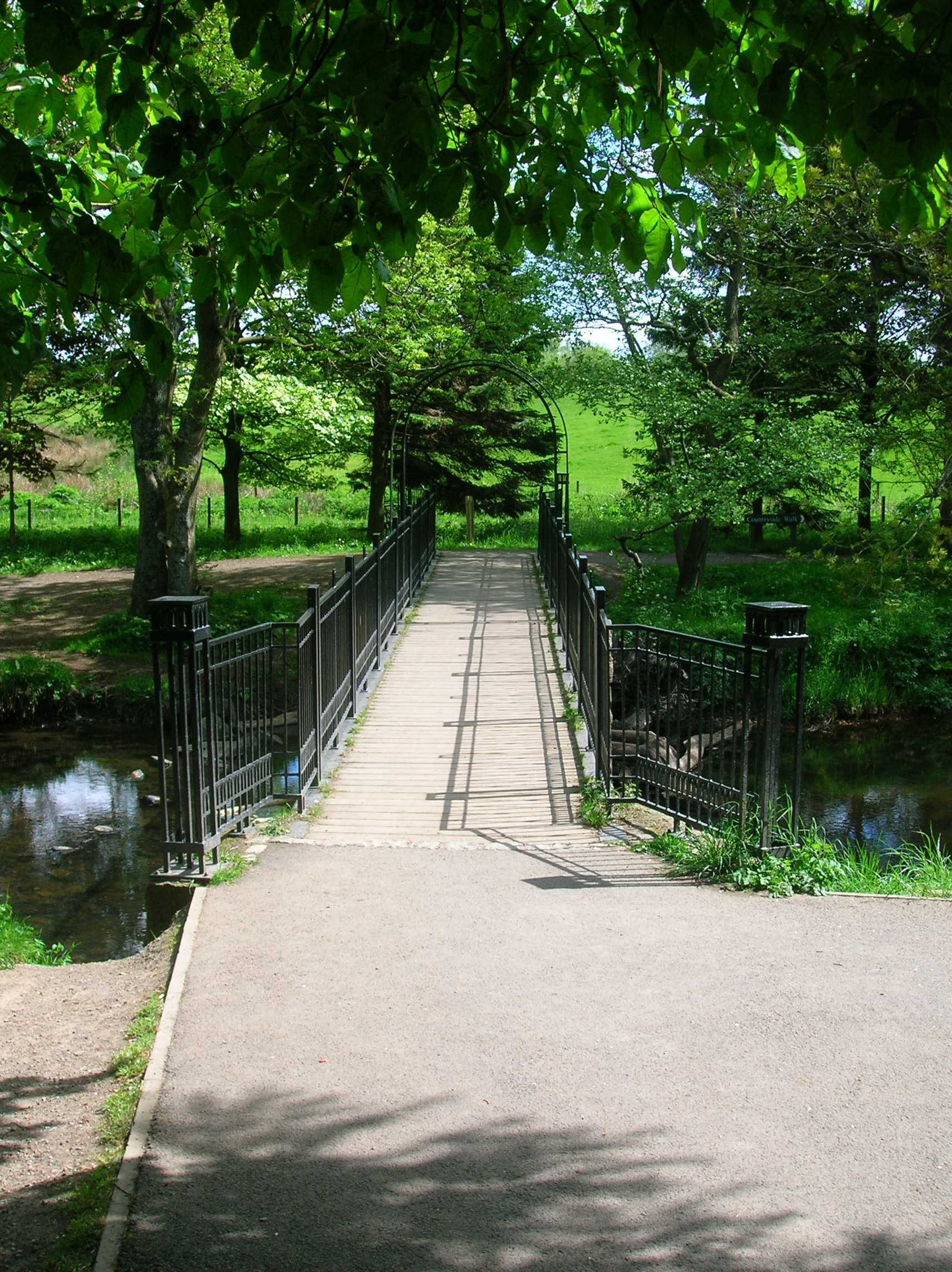
The view across the Laundry or Castle Bridge.

== Lugton Water ==
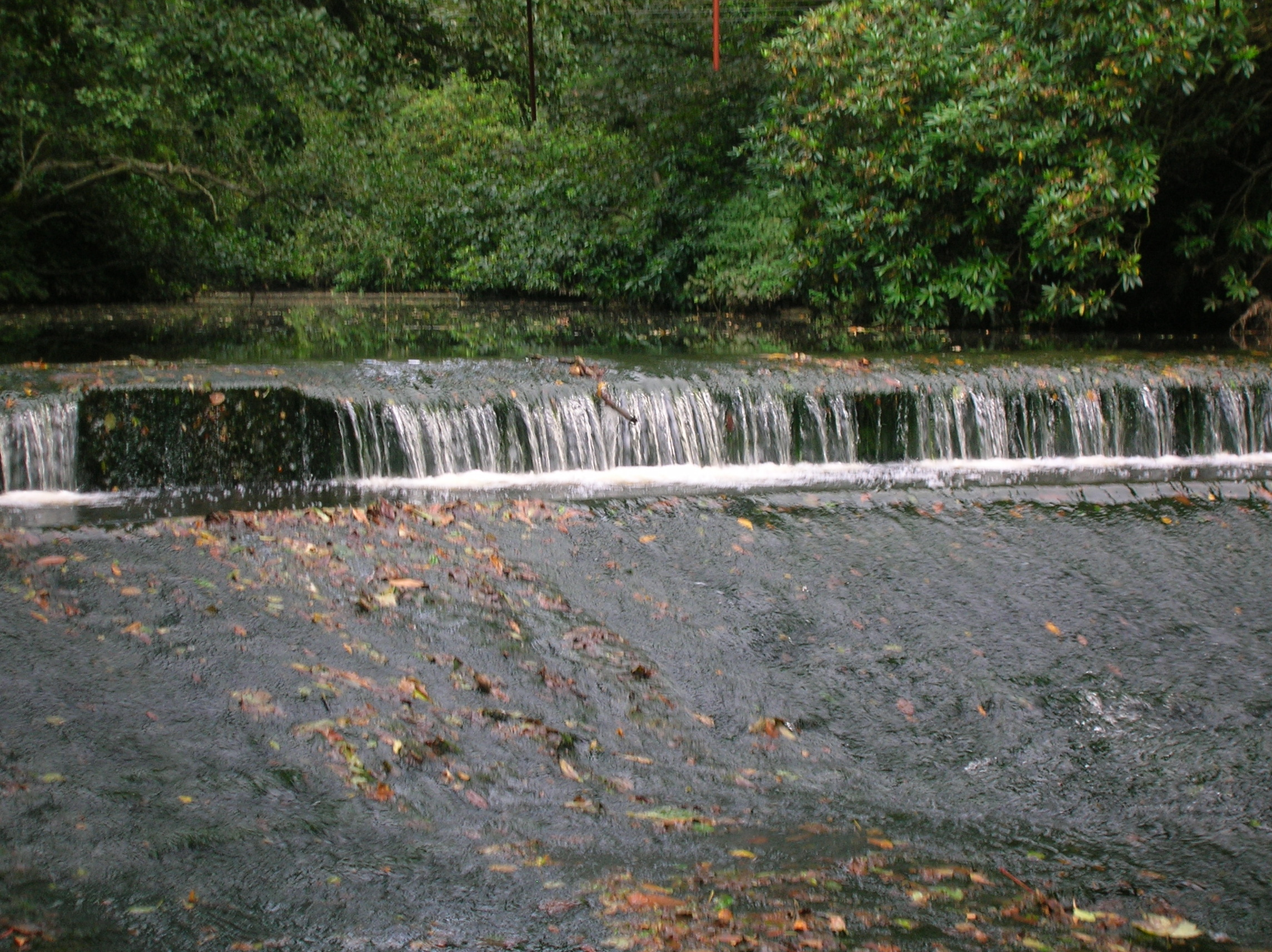
The coffer-dam weir on the Lugton Water near the Suspension Bridge in 2008

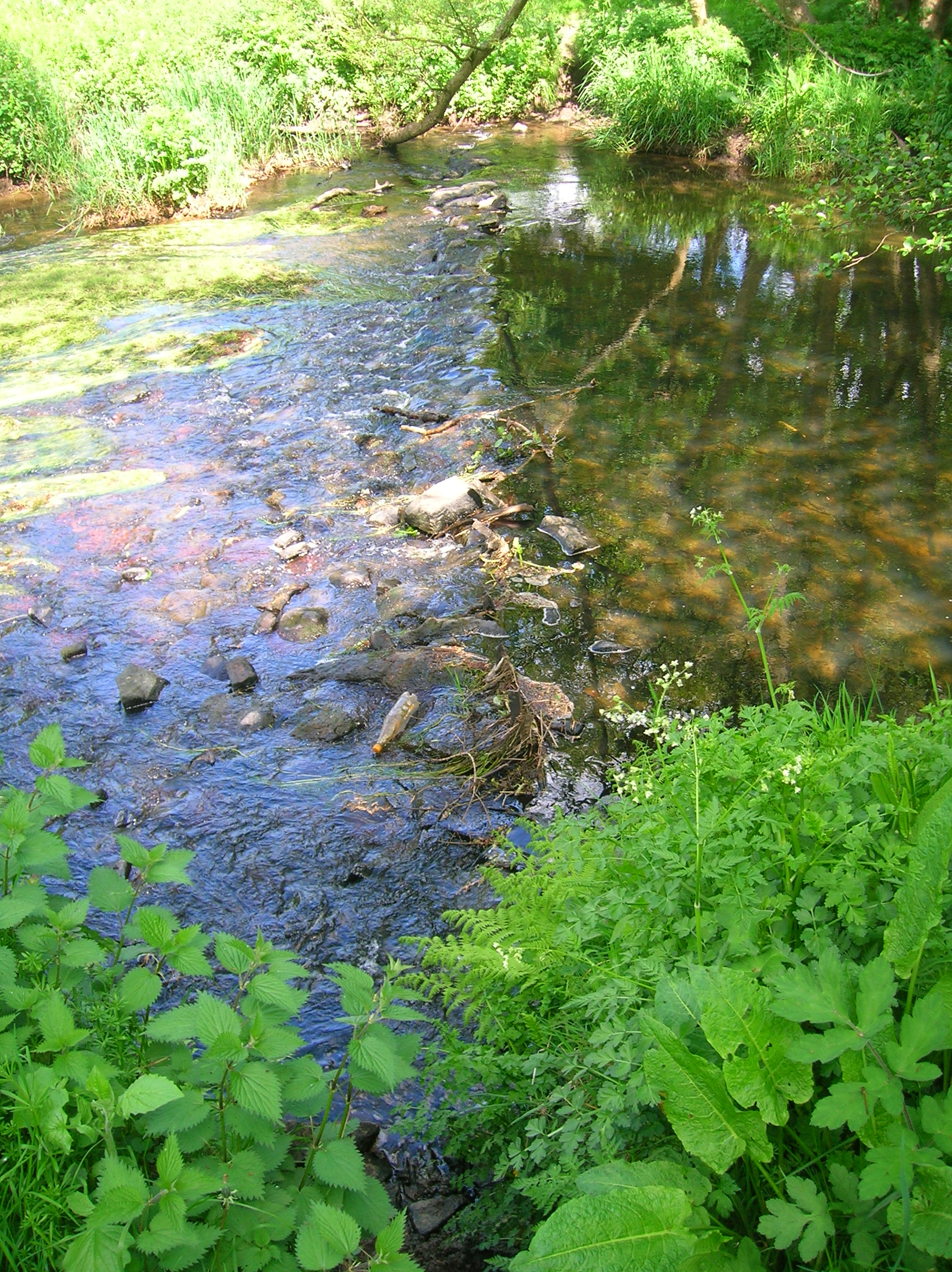
The Weir on the Lugton Water at the site of the old three arched Tournament Bridge

The Lugton Water was diverted and altered several times, for example in the 1790s its course was altered by the 12th Earl (1740–1819) to run behind the Garden Cottage, rather than in front of it. The width was also changed at times, for instance five ponds or lakes were created by large weirs at one stage; the one at the Tournament Bridge is clearly visible in older prints of the 1840s (see illustrations) shown.

The size, shape and position of the various weirs was altered several times, latterly by Clement Wilson of the canning factory. One of the weirs lies directly beneath the restored Tournament Bridge. The one below the site of the old Bowling Green and Robert Burns's garden was U-shaped, holding back sufficient water at one time to form a lake with a small island bearing a single yew tree. The 1938 OS map shows no fewer than seven weirs between the castle and the present-day suspension bridge.

== The Clement Wilson gardens ==
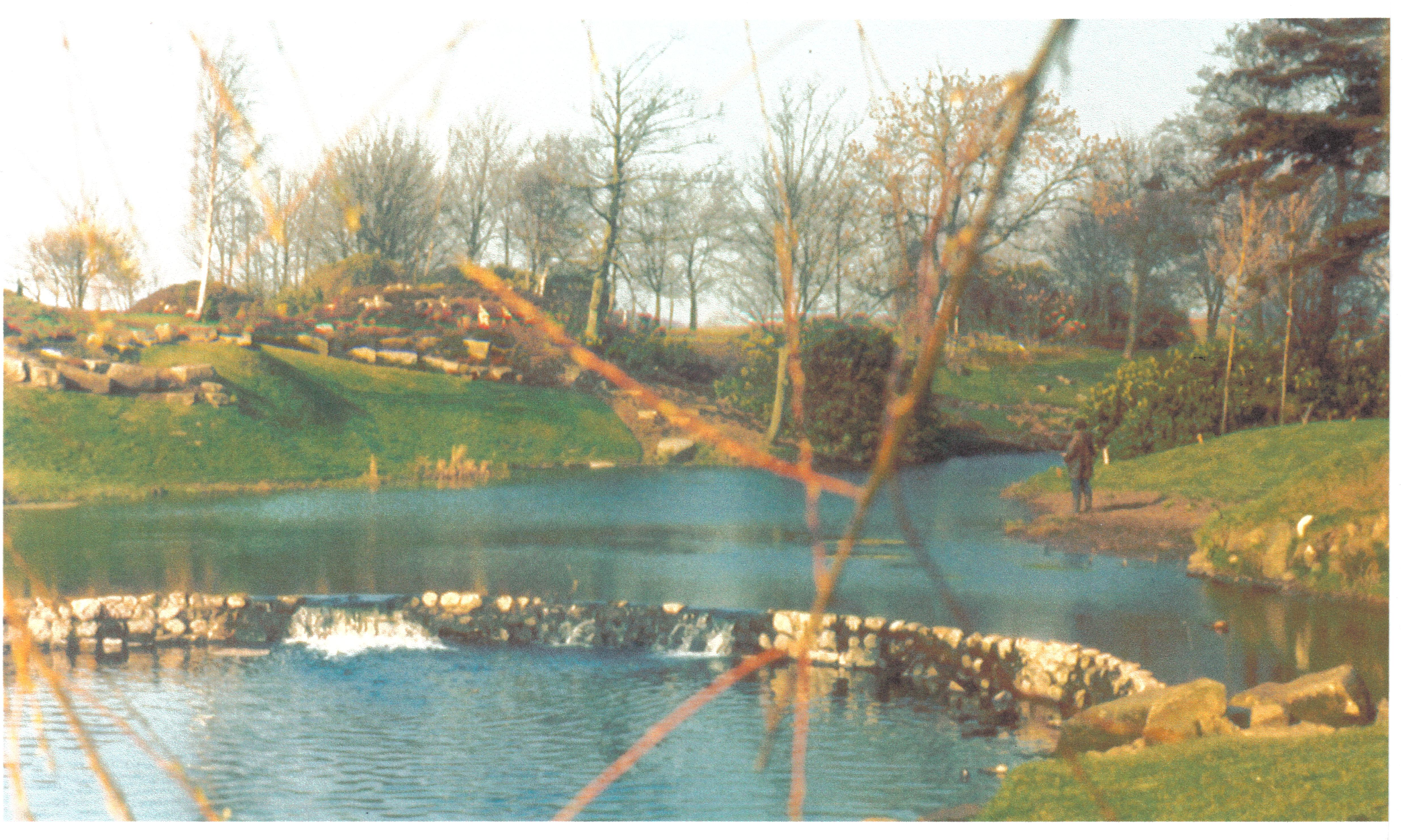
The Clement Wilson Gardens in the 1970s.

In 1948 the trustees of the late 16th Earl sold most of the remaining parts of the estate to Robert Howie and Sons of Dunlop for £24,000 and in the 1950s the Wilson family purchased the Tournament Bridge, old offices, castle ruins, and other land from Robert Howie and Sons.

Clement Wilson, the food processing factory owner, established the Clement Wilson Foundation which opened part of the grounds to the public, spending around £400,000 (around £4,317,000 in 2008 terms) on partially restoring the Tournament Bridge, consolidating the castle ruins, planting trees, landscaping, making paths, creating a rockery and waterfall feature, etc.

== 2008–9 restoration ==
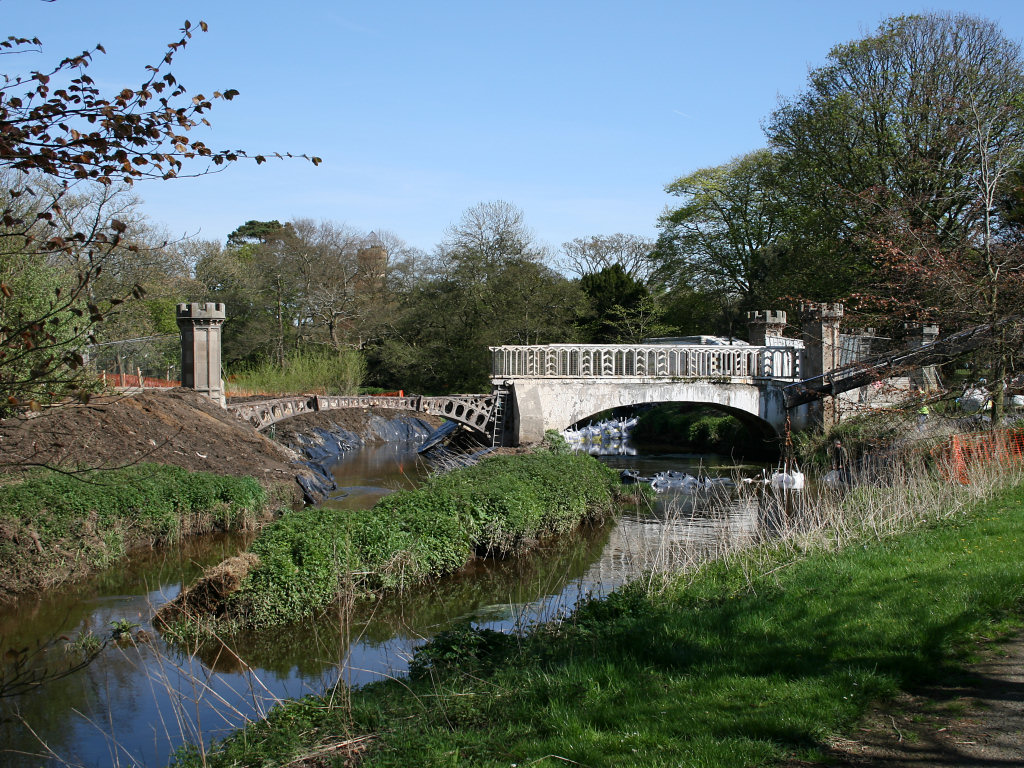
The bridge partially dismantled and half way through hydrodemolition during renovation in May 2008

Historic Scotland, in their project brief required a ‘faithful restoration where all details are replicated as closely as possible in terms of material, design and construction’ .

In 2010 The Saltire Society in association with The Institution of Civil Engineers issued a commendation for the works at that year’s awards ceremony.

Those organisation’s recognised in the commendation included:

- Principal Designer - Jacobs Engineering UK Limited
- Specialist advisor - North Ayrshire Council
- Principal contractor W I and A Gilbert Limited
- Cast Iron Manufacturer Ballantyne Bo’ness Iron Company Limited

This commendation was in recognition of the “highly skilled” craftmanship and research.

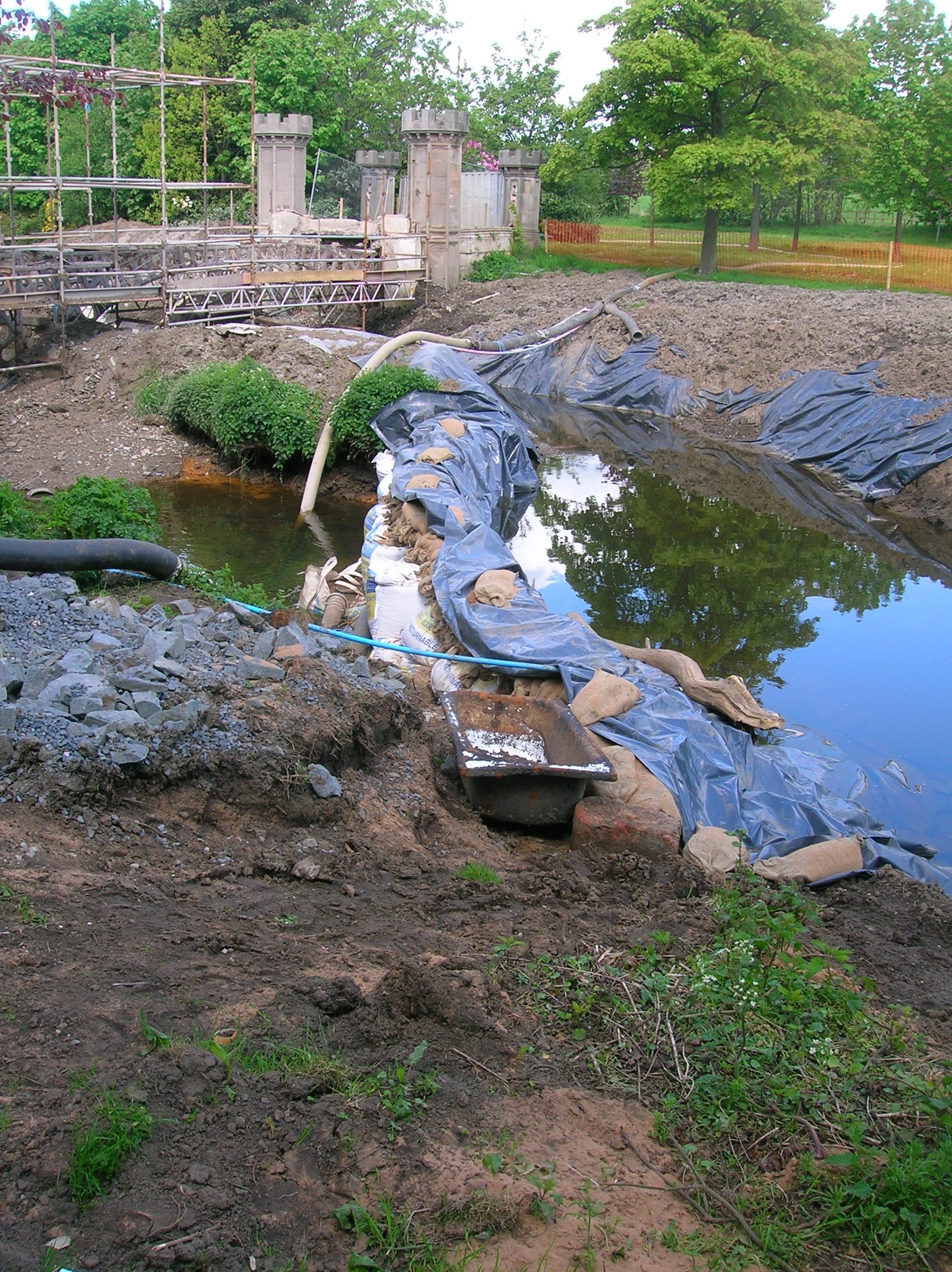
The temporary earth dam in the Lugton Water

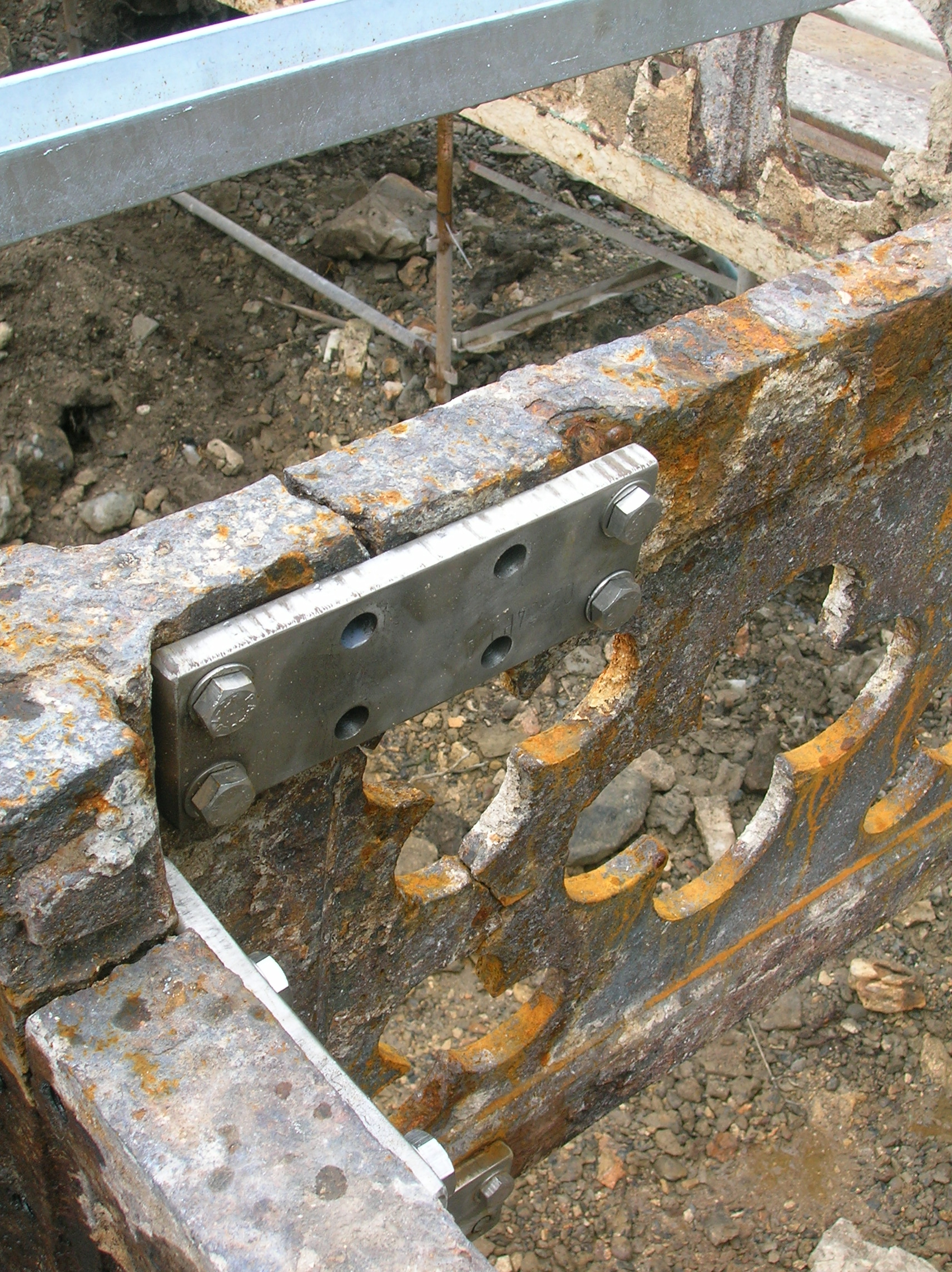
Close-up of a repair to the cracked cast iron

Specifically the works undertaken included the following: The concrete arches were removed as well as the infill above. The concrete arches were replaced with the existing refurbished cast-iron arch sections and new cast-iron fascia sections, which have restored the original width of the structure. The load-bearing capacity of the bridge is carried by a modern steel structure concealed beneath the wooden deck surface, as this was considered to be the original material, possibly coated with a layer of whin dust or such-like.

The timber parapets have been replaced with cast-iron sections to match the original items. All of the cast-iron elements have been fabricated and fitted by the Ballantine Bo'ness Iron Company to restore the splendour of the original structure.

The restoration involved hydrodemolition to expose the cast-iron arches through removing the concrete in which they had been embedded. This process used very high pressure water jets and confirmed the poor structural integrity of the iron arches. They were not however intended to be load bearing in the restored bridge and an upside was the degree of Gothic artwork found to exist on the arches.

The estimated total project cost was £720k. Historic Scotland have indicated that they would be able to contribute some £161k, around £5k will be provided in kind, and the shortfall of £354k was the subject of the successful grant application to the Heritage Lottery Fund. The final cost was in the order of a million pounds.

The bridge deck is made from imported hardwoods such as Ipe. The bridge was re-opened on Friday, 26 June 2009.

=== Views of restoration works carried out in 2008–2009 ===
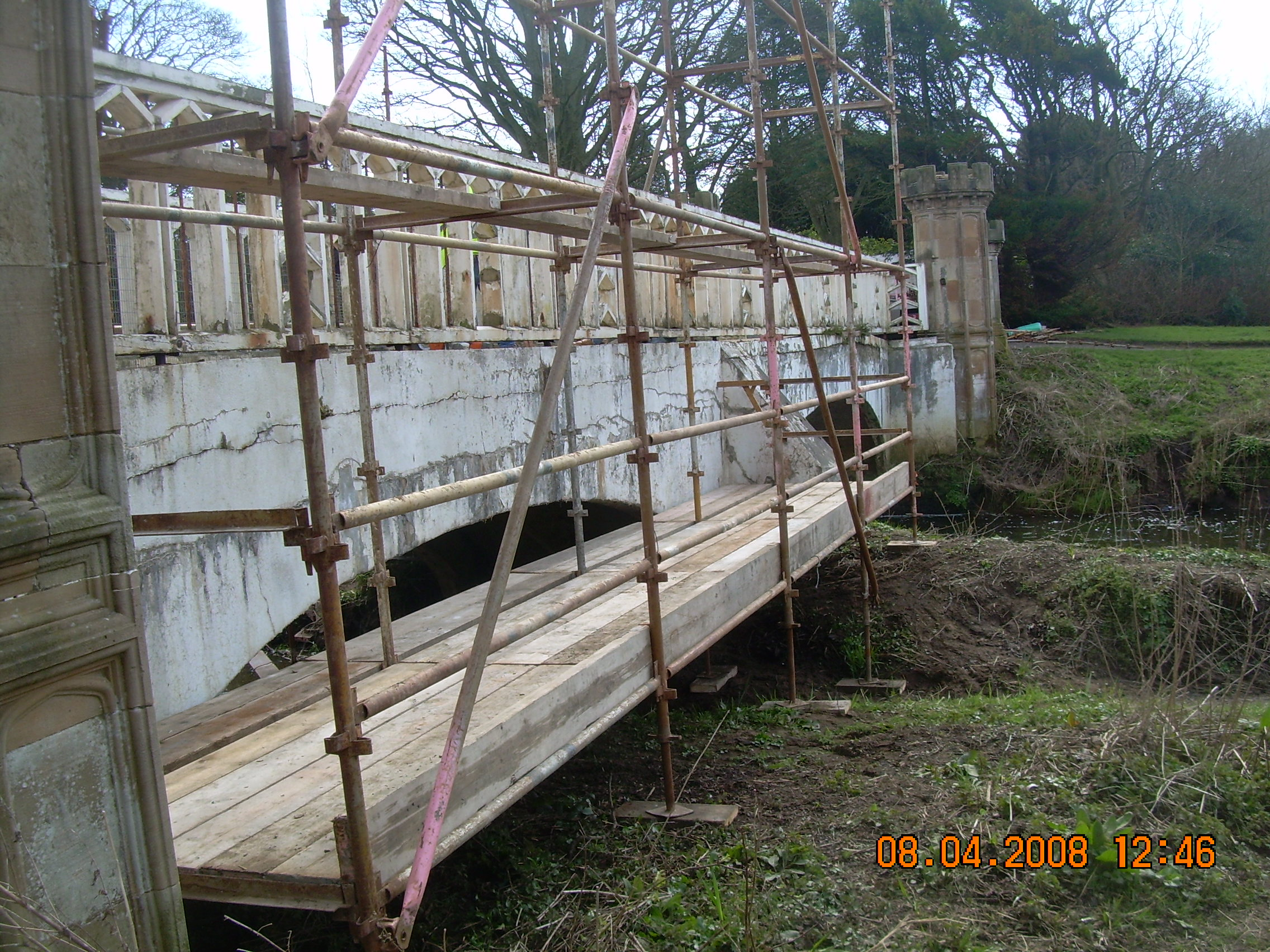
Work begins

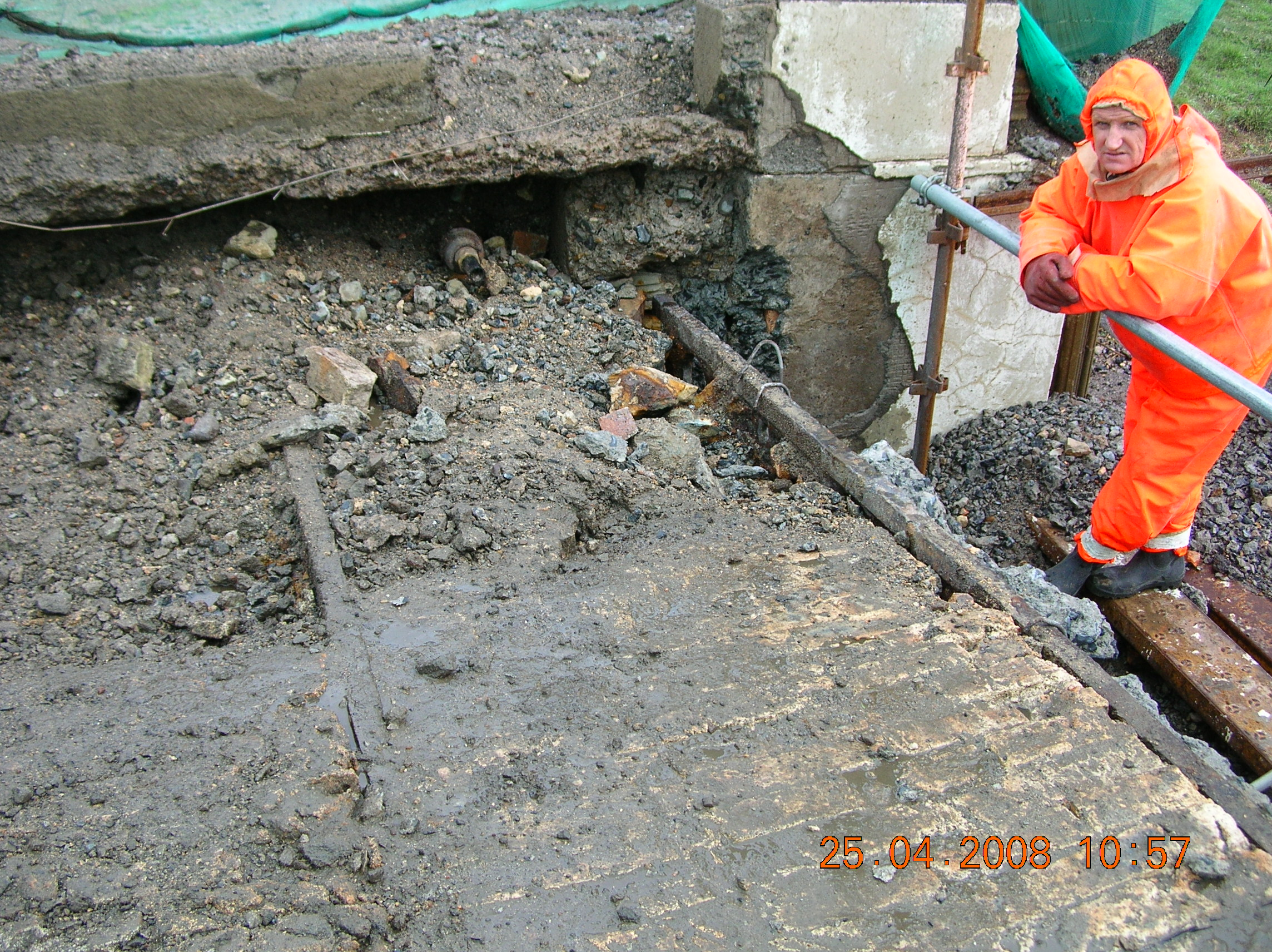
A hydrodemolition operative in protective clothing

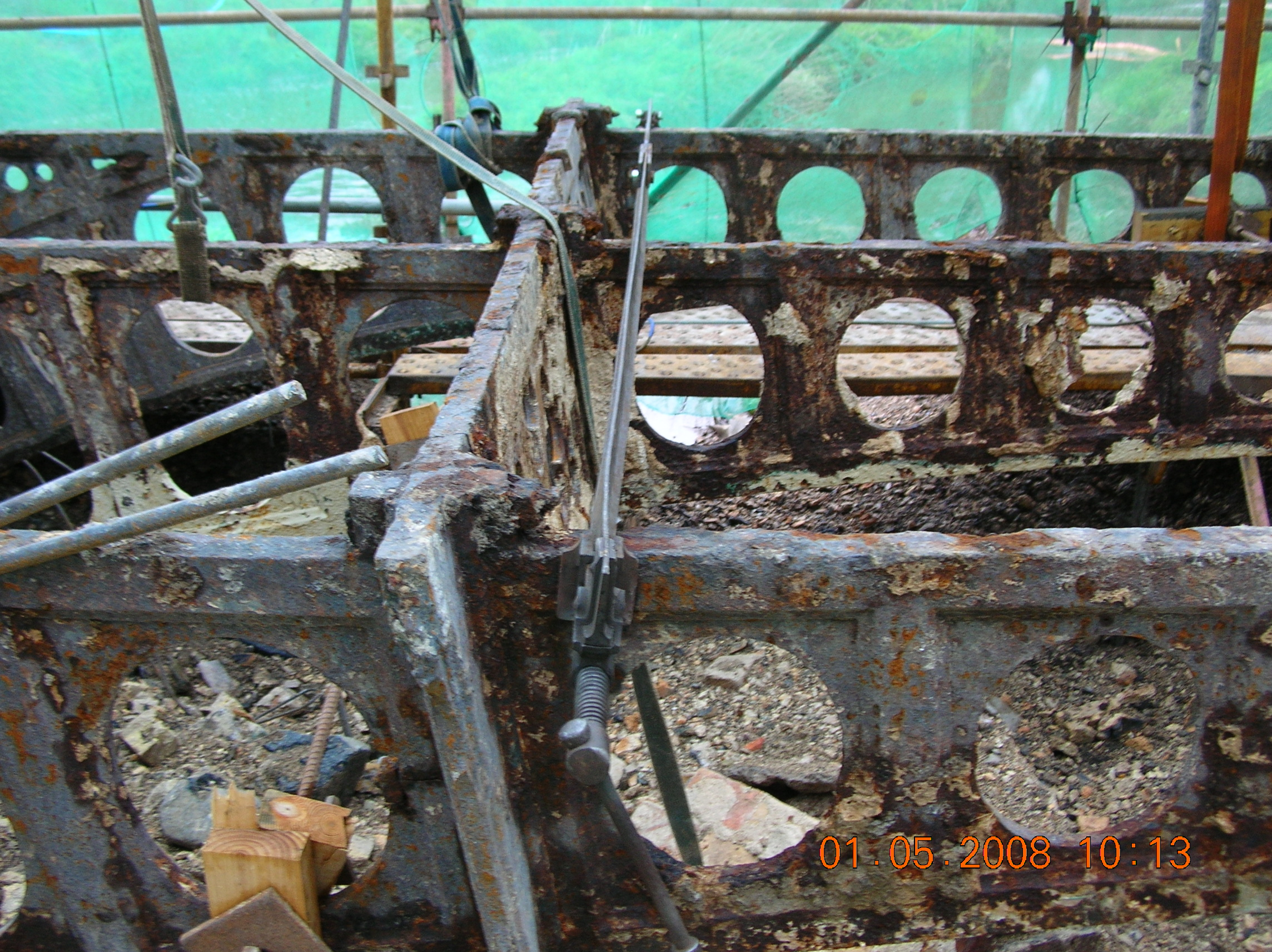
A cast-iron cross strut holding the arches together so they do not move sideways

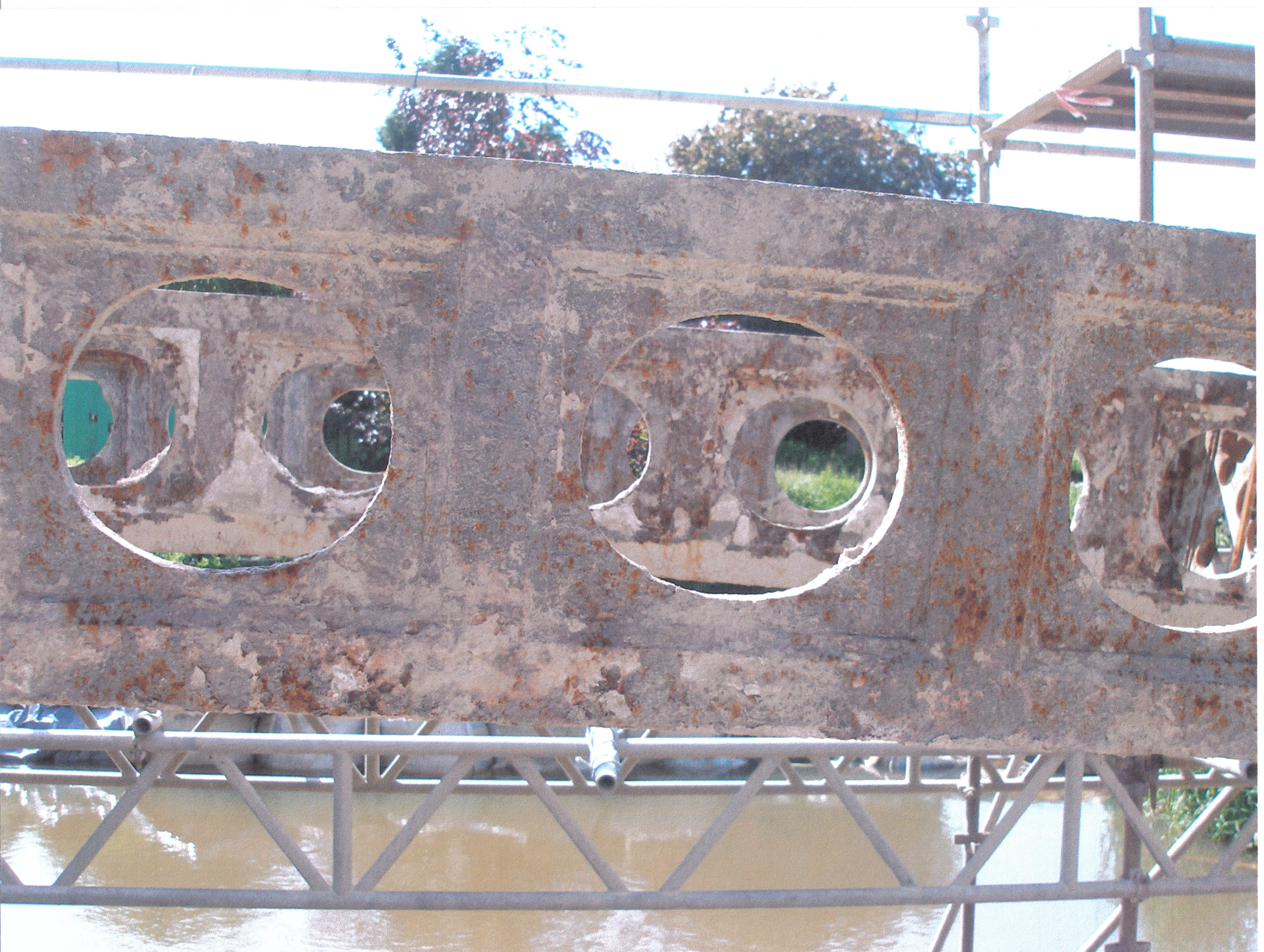
Detail of the cast-iron arches

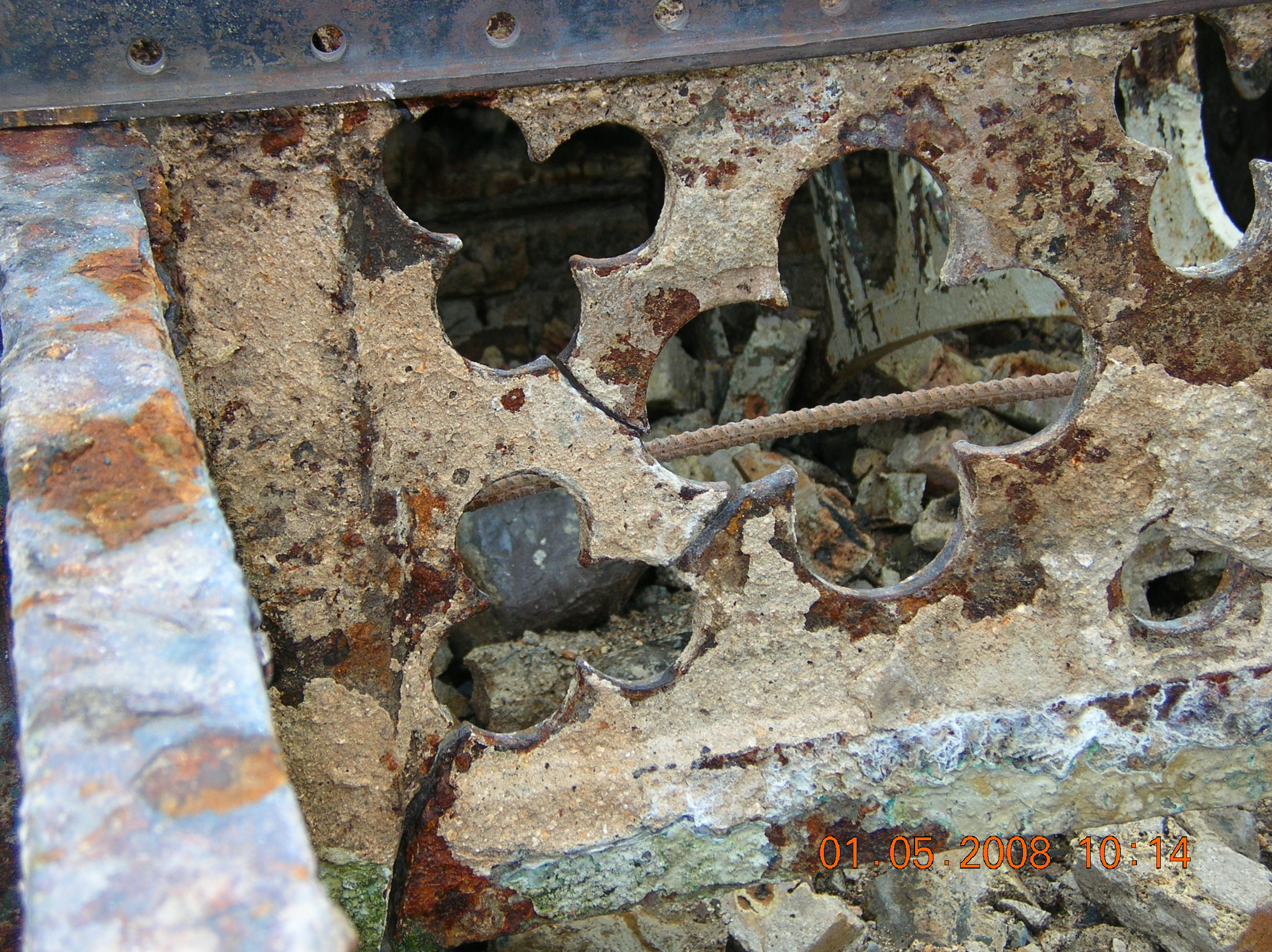
Detail of the Gothic ornamentation on the cast-iron arches. Note the cracks in the ironwork.

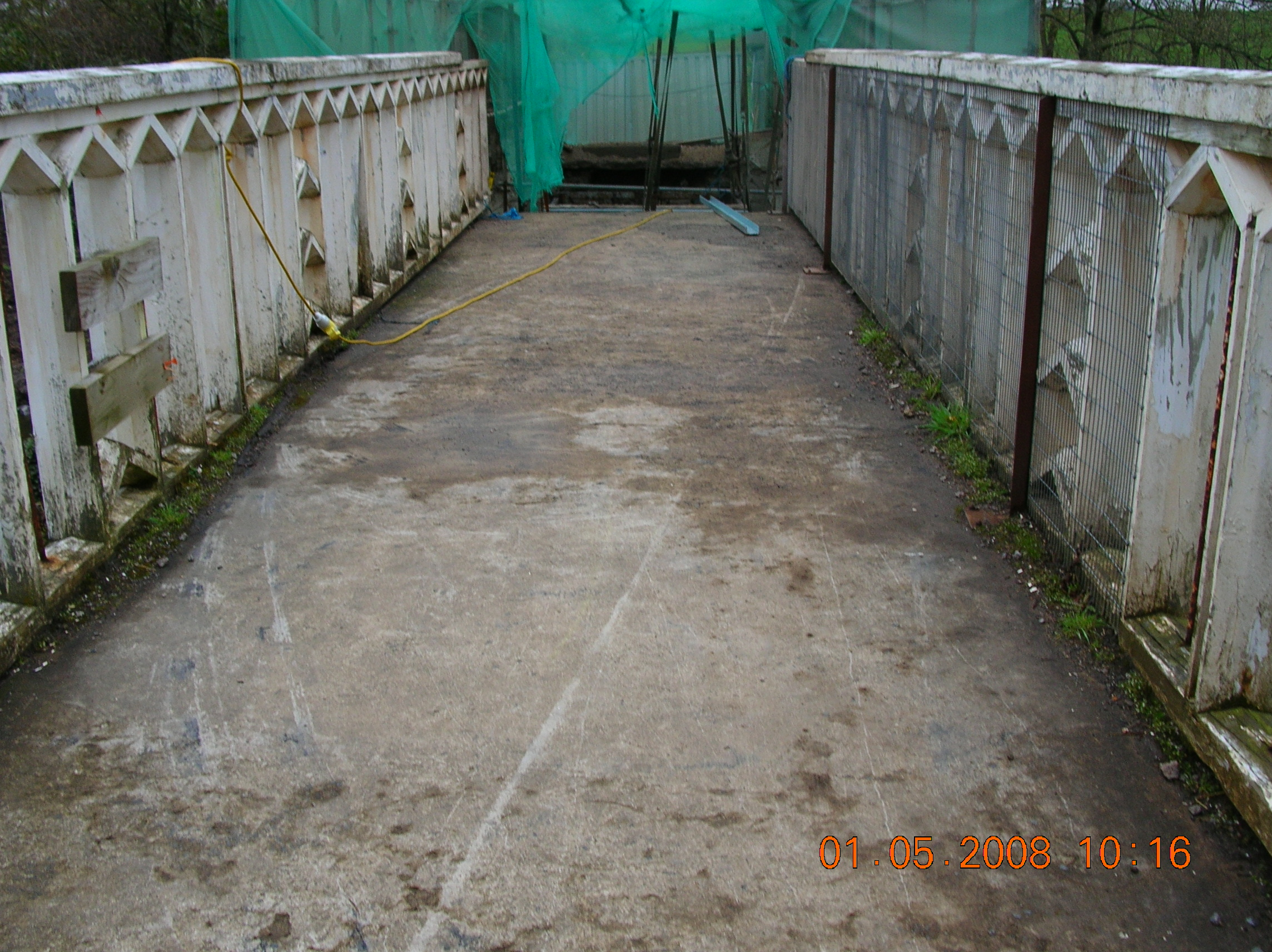
The concrete decking prior to hydrodemolition and the exposure of the cast-iron arches

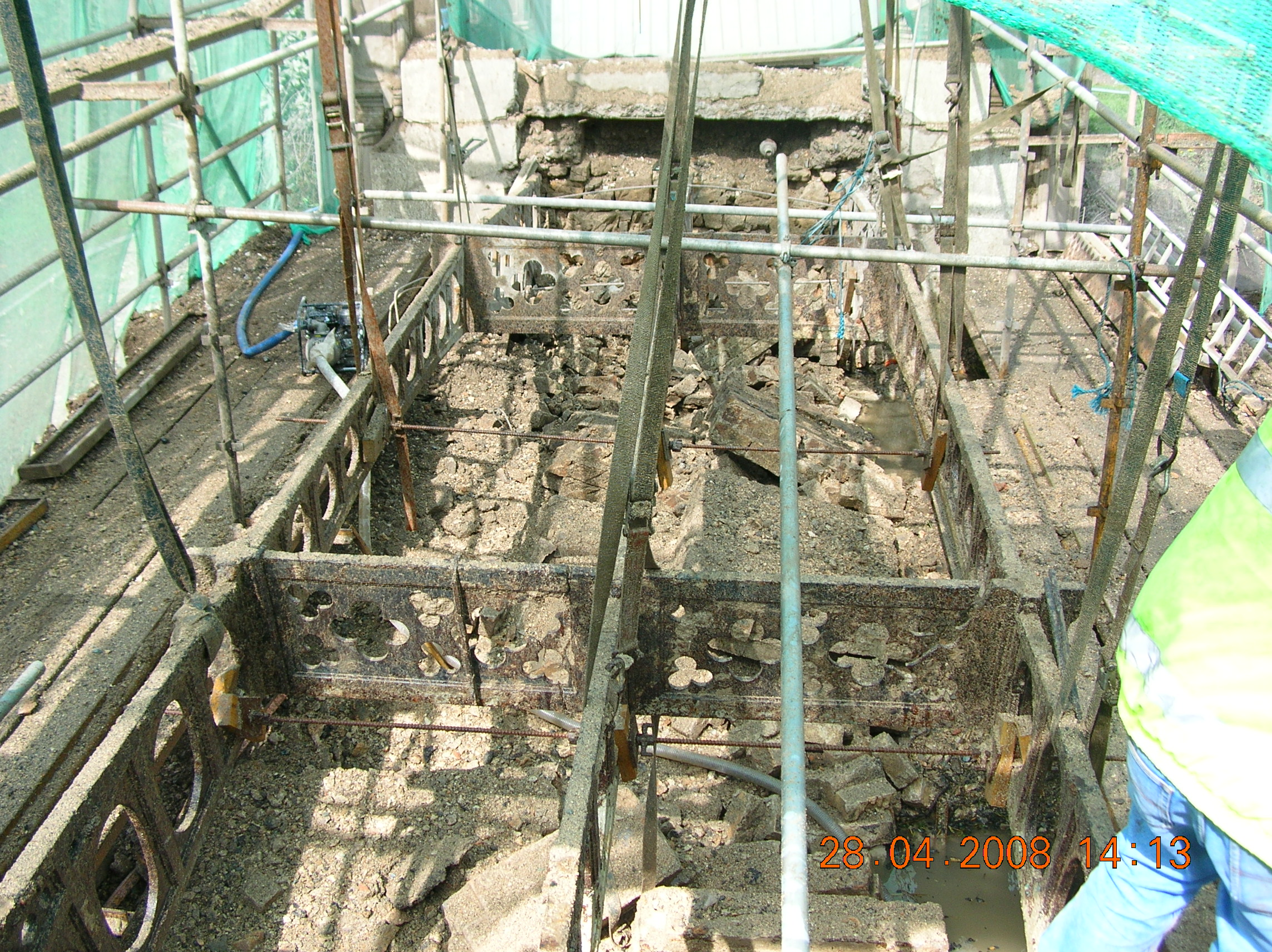
The concrete removed and the cast-iron arches exposed

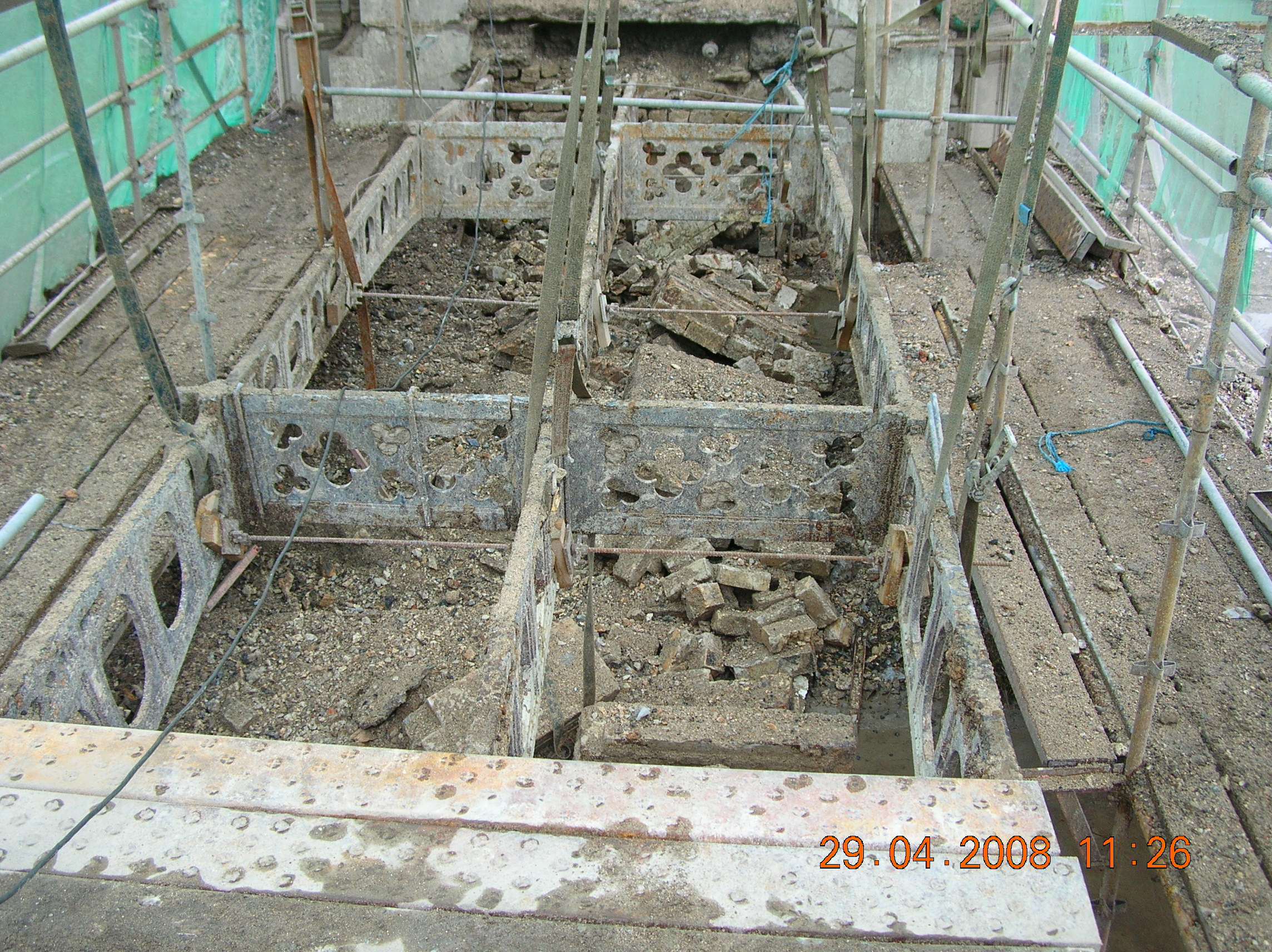
Fully exposed cast-iron arches

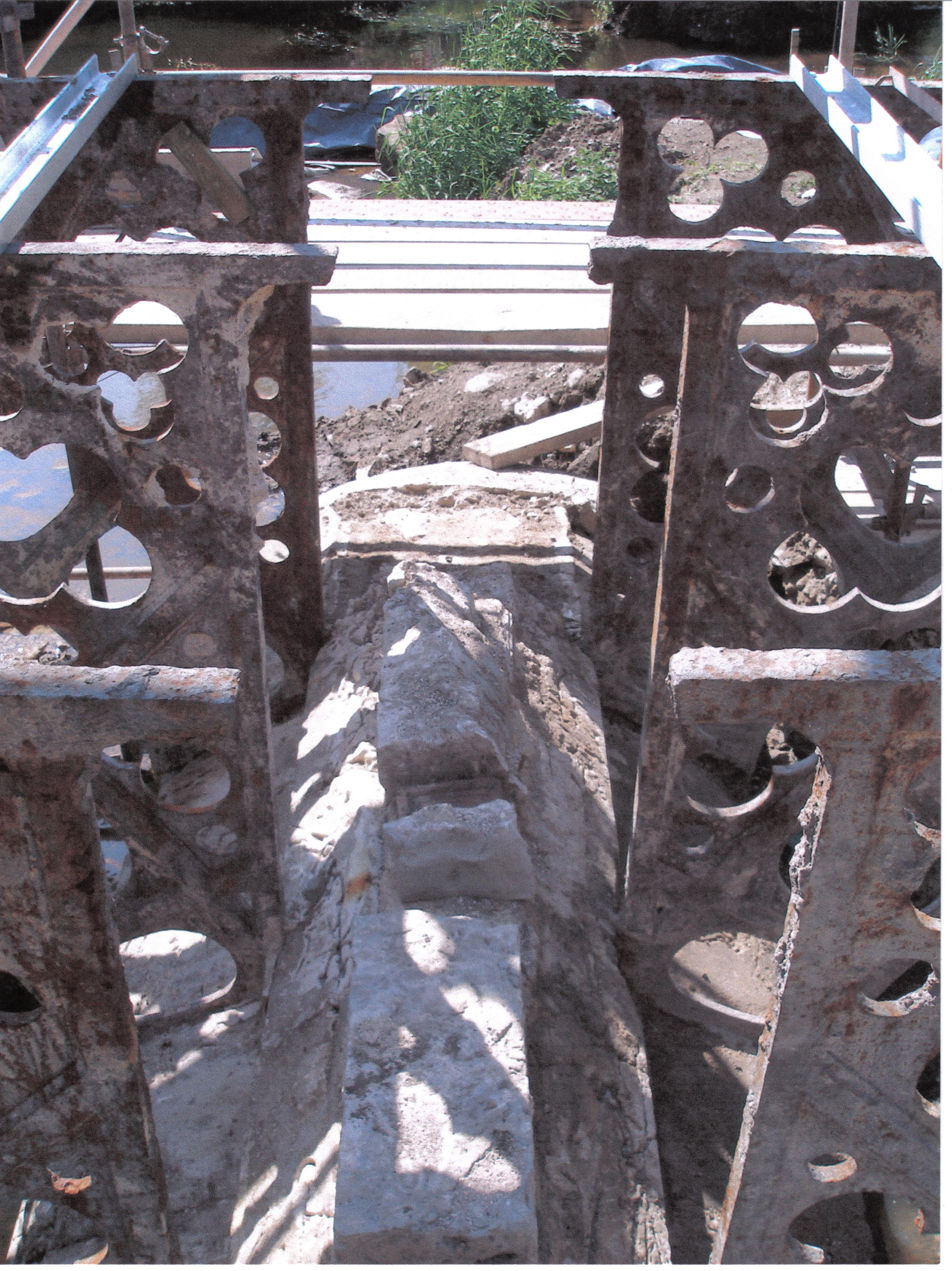
Details of the central pier's construction

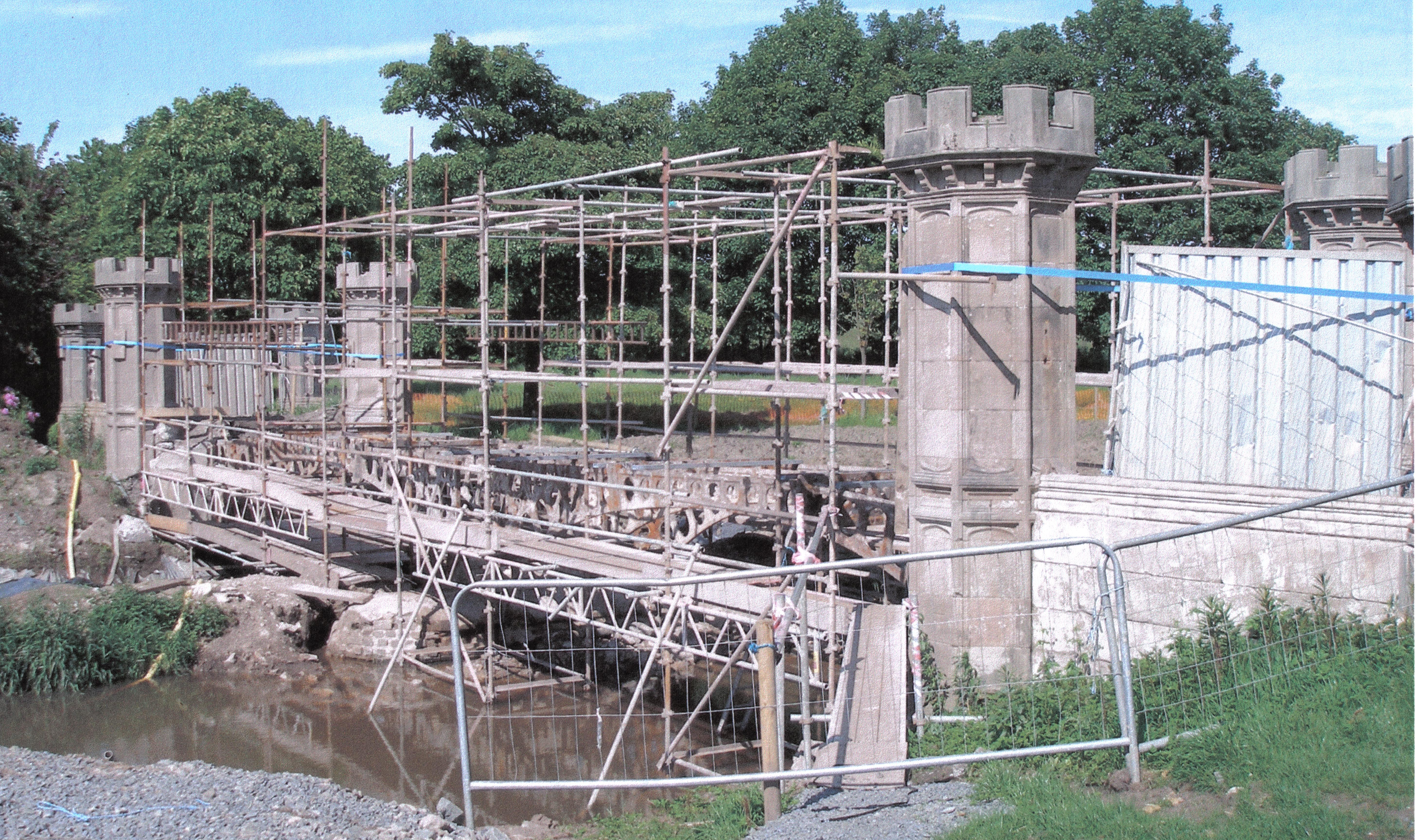
Ready for painting

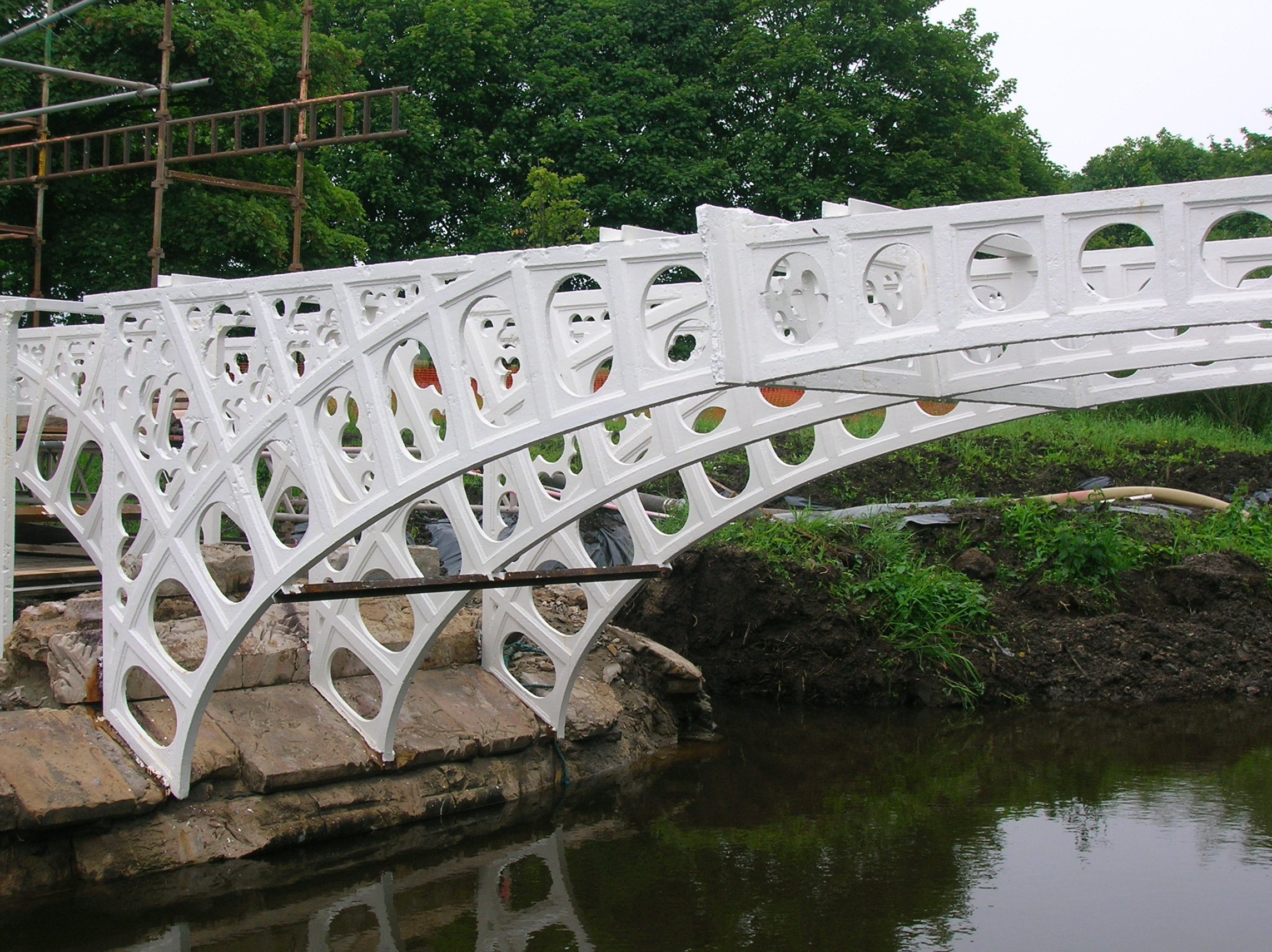
The white protective paint and the central pier

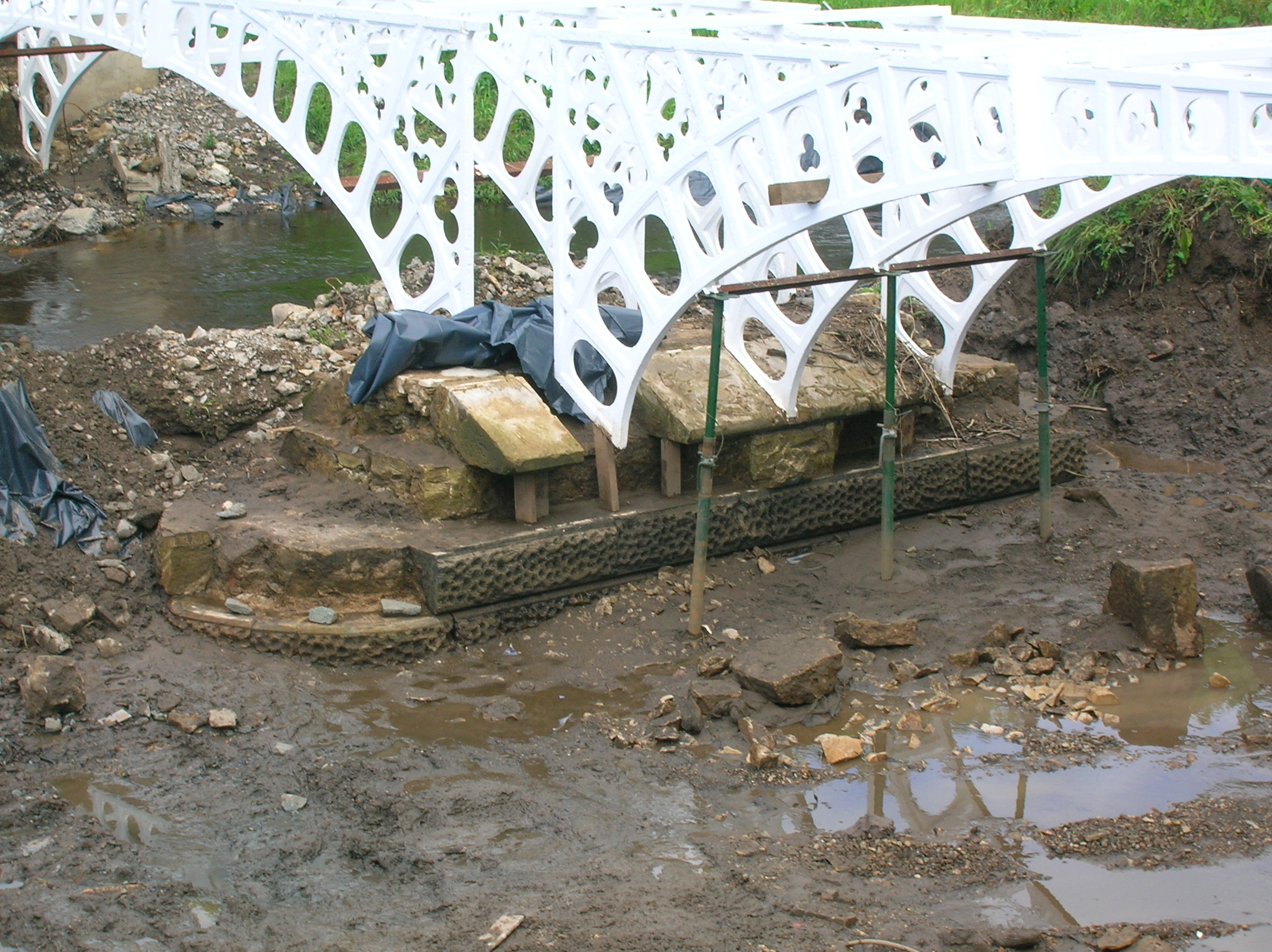
Repairs underway to the central pier and cutwaters

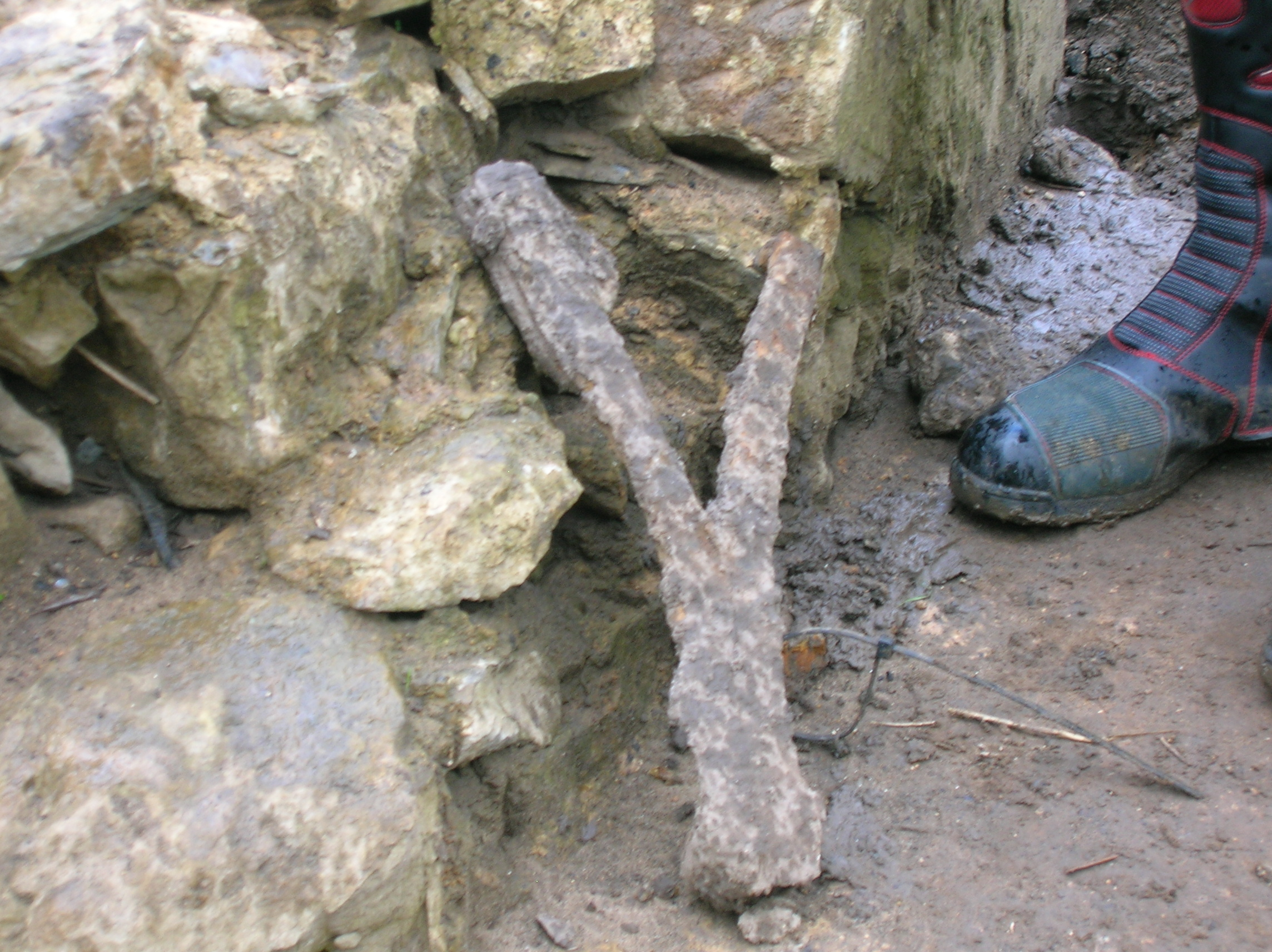
An old iron stone block binding. These expanded as they rusted and ironically led to the loosening of the stonework.

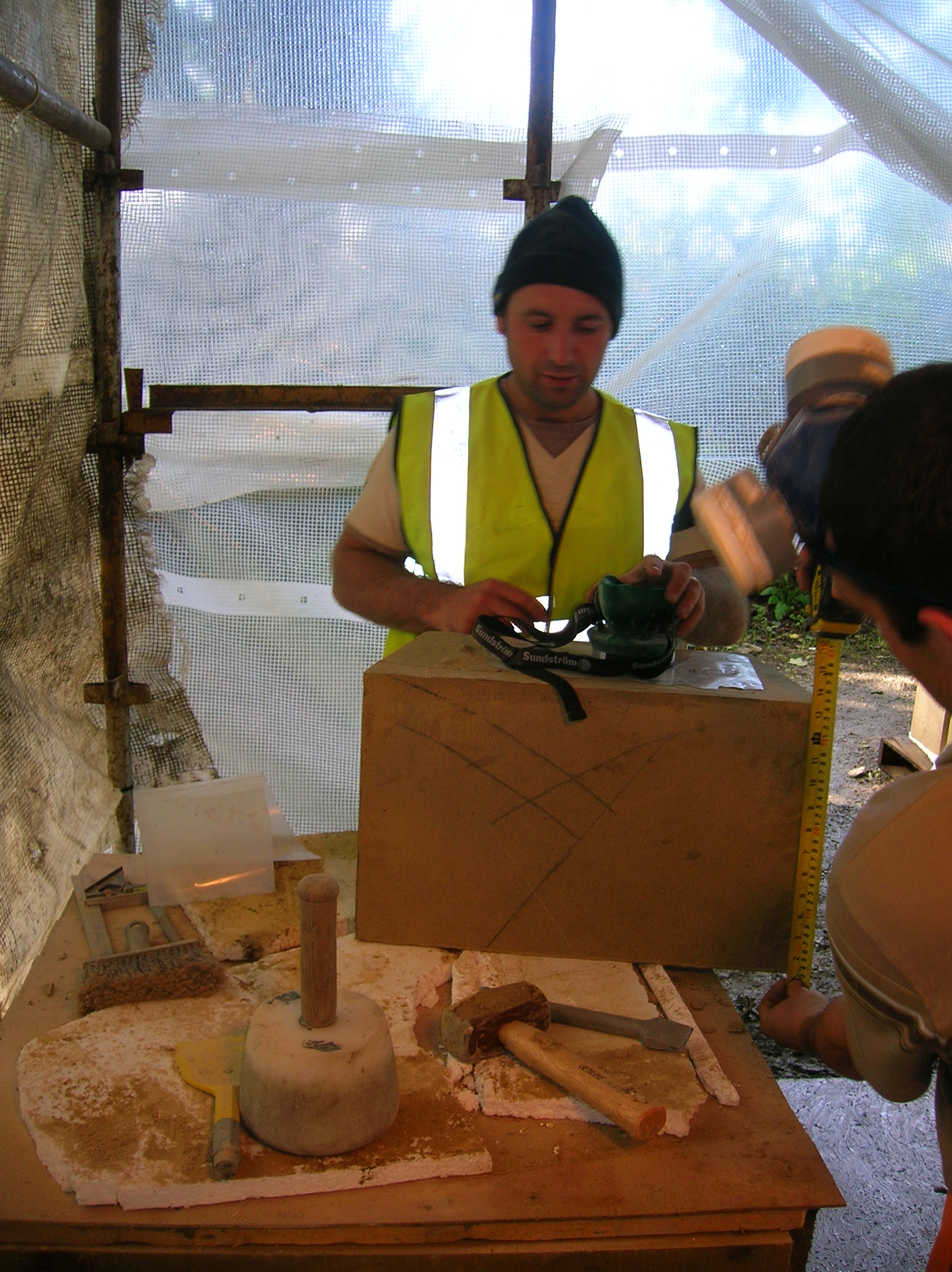
At work on the stone for the central pier. Note the craft tools

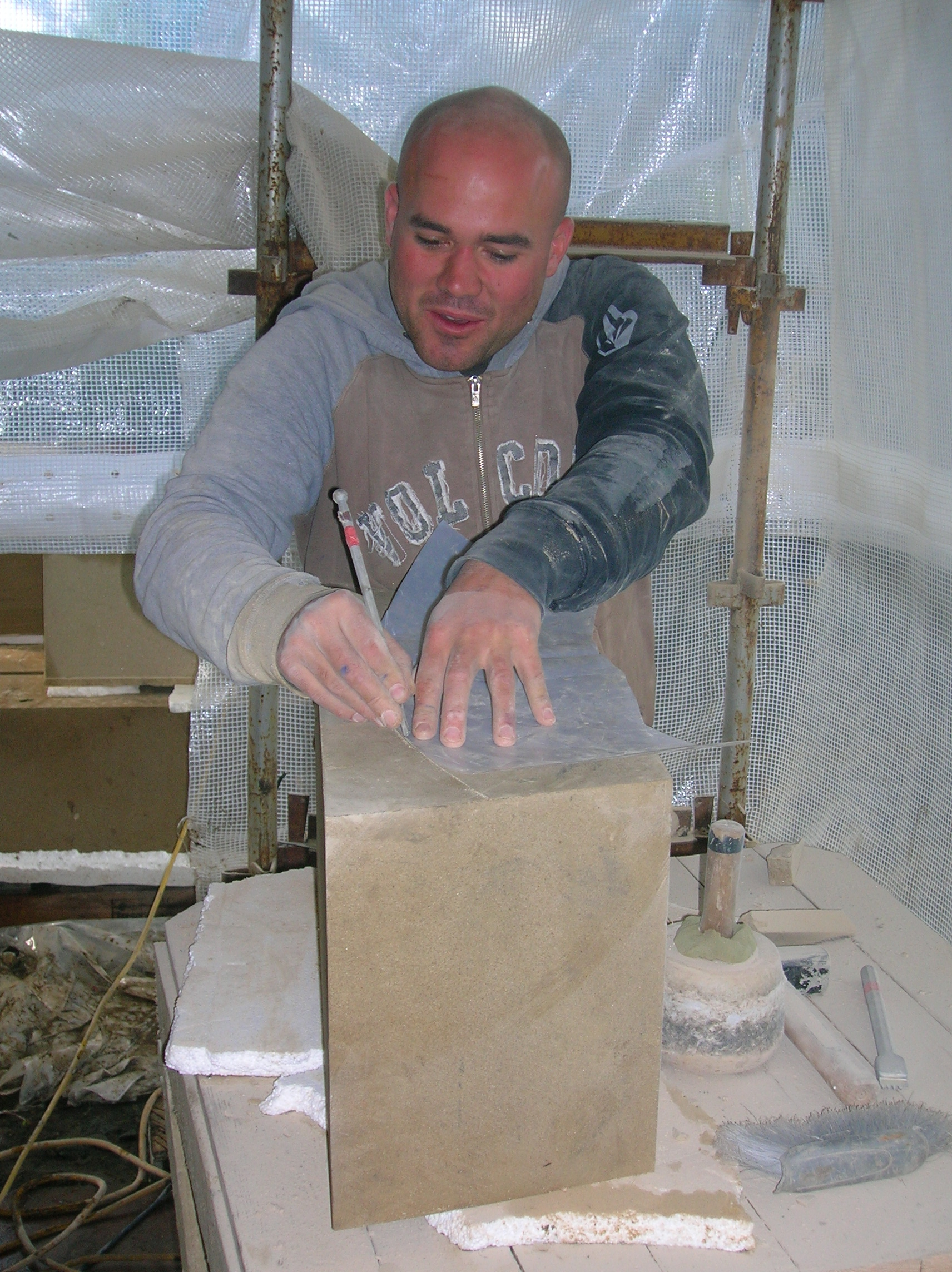
Marking out a block before cutting out the design

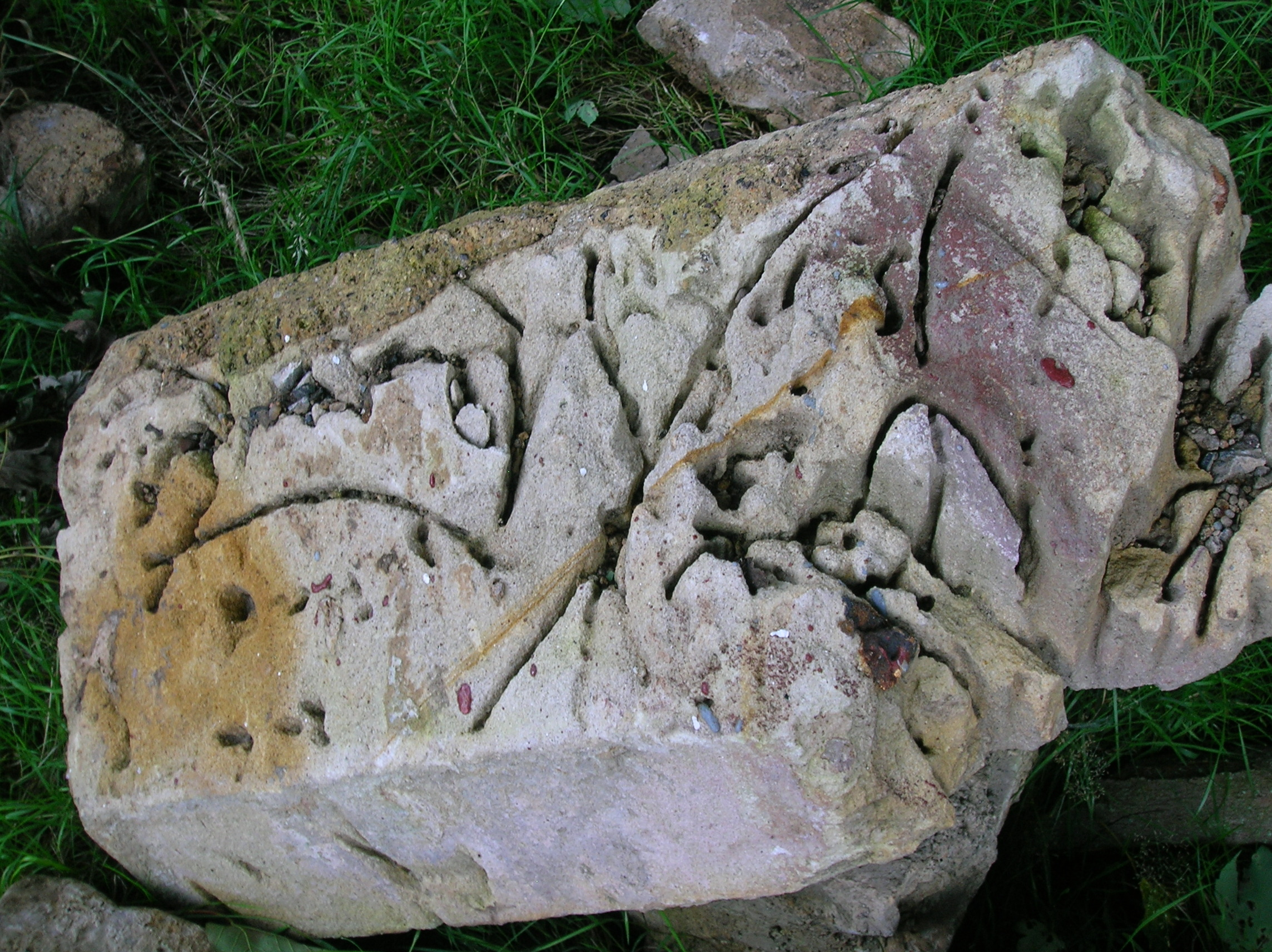
Hydrodemolition damage to a sandstone block from the bridge

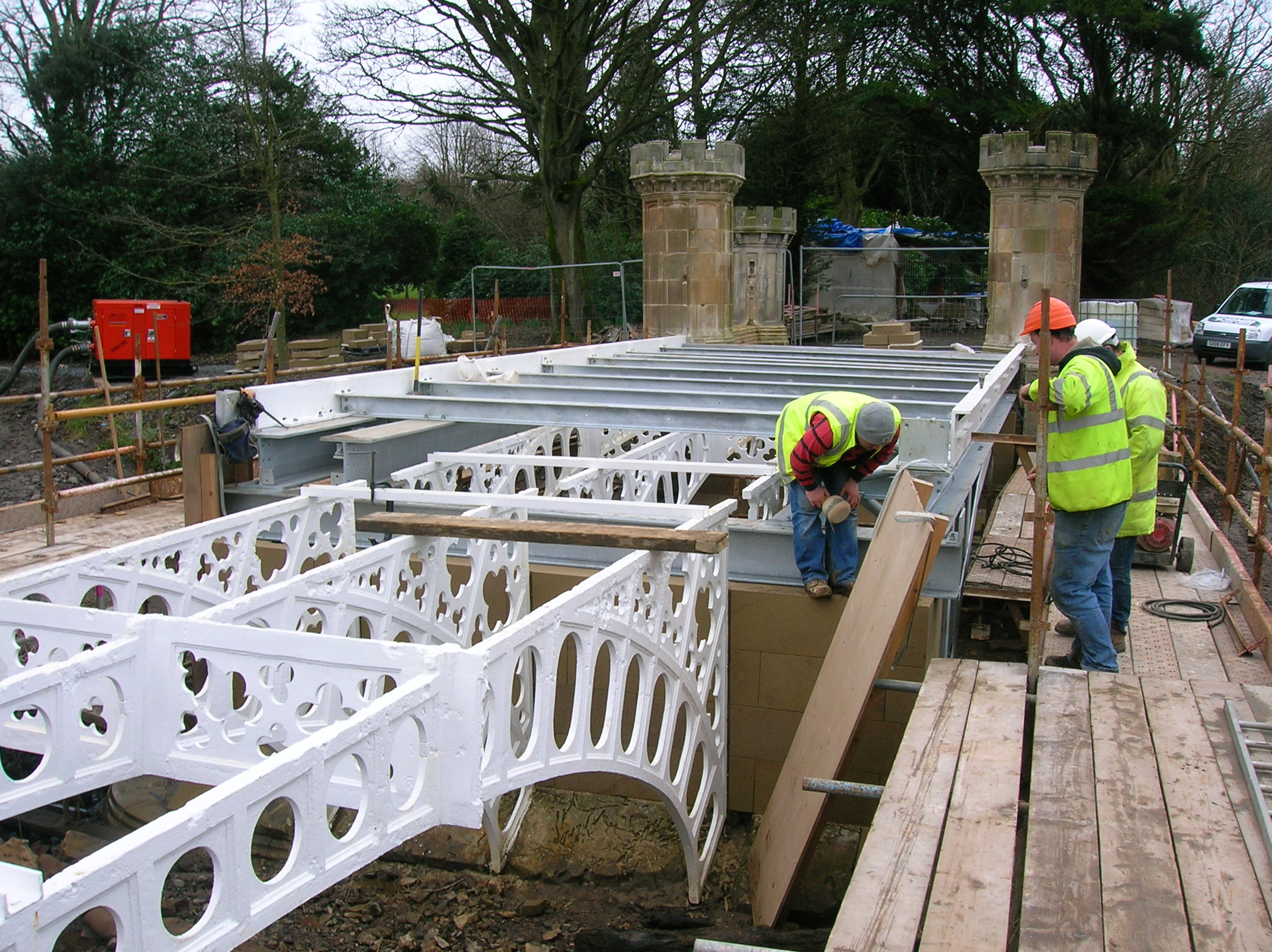
The load-bearing frame. March 2009

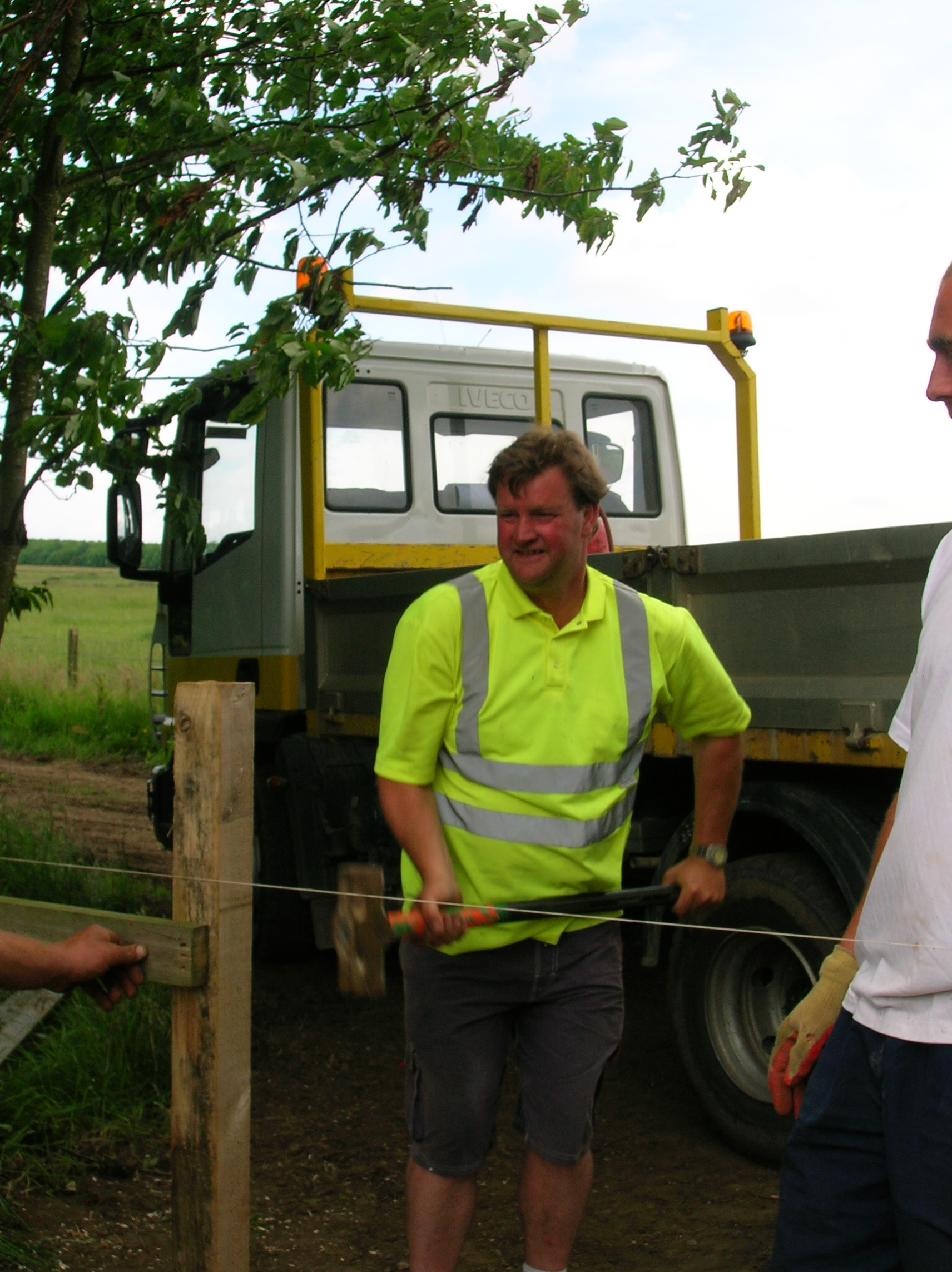
Kenny Working – finishing touches at the project site

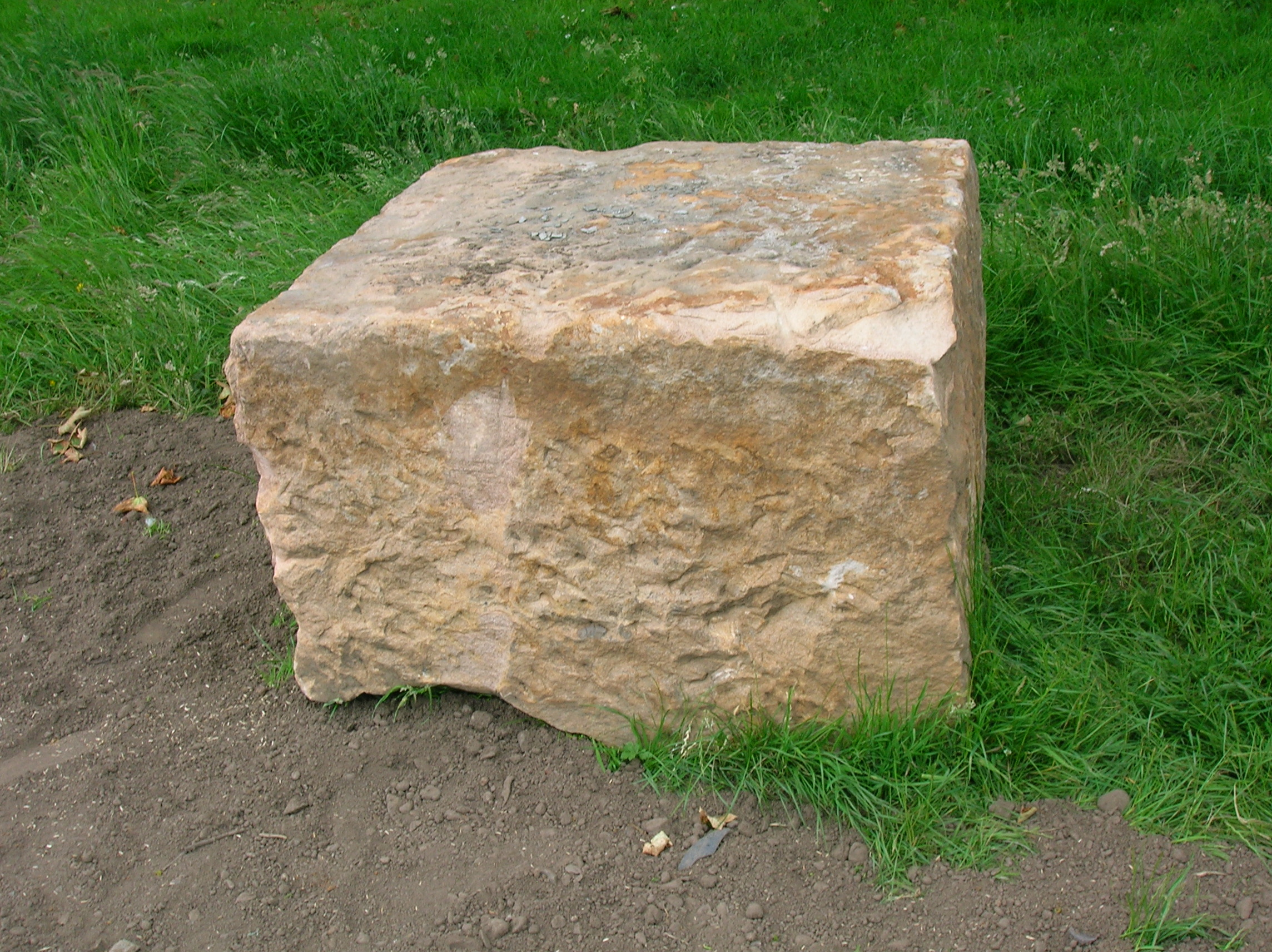
A possible Mason's Bench from the 1845 bridge construction

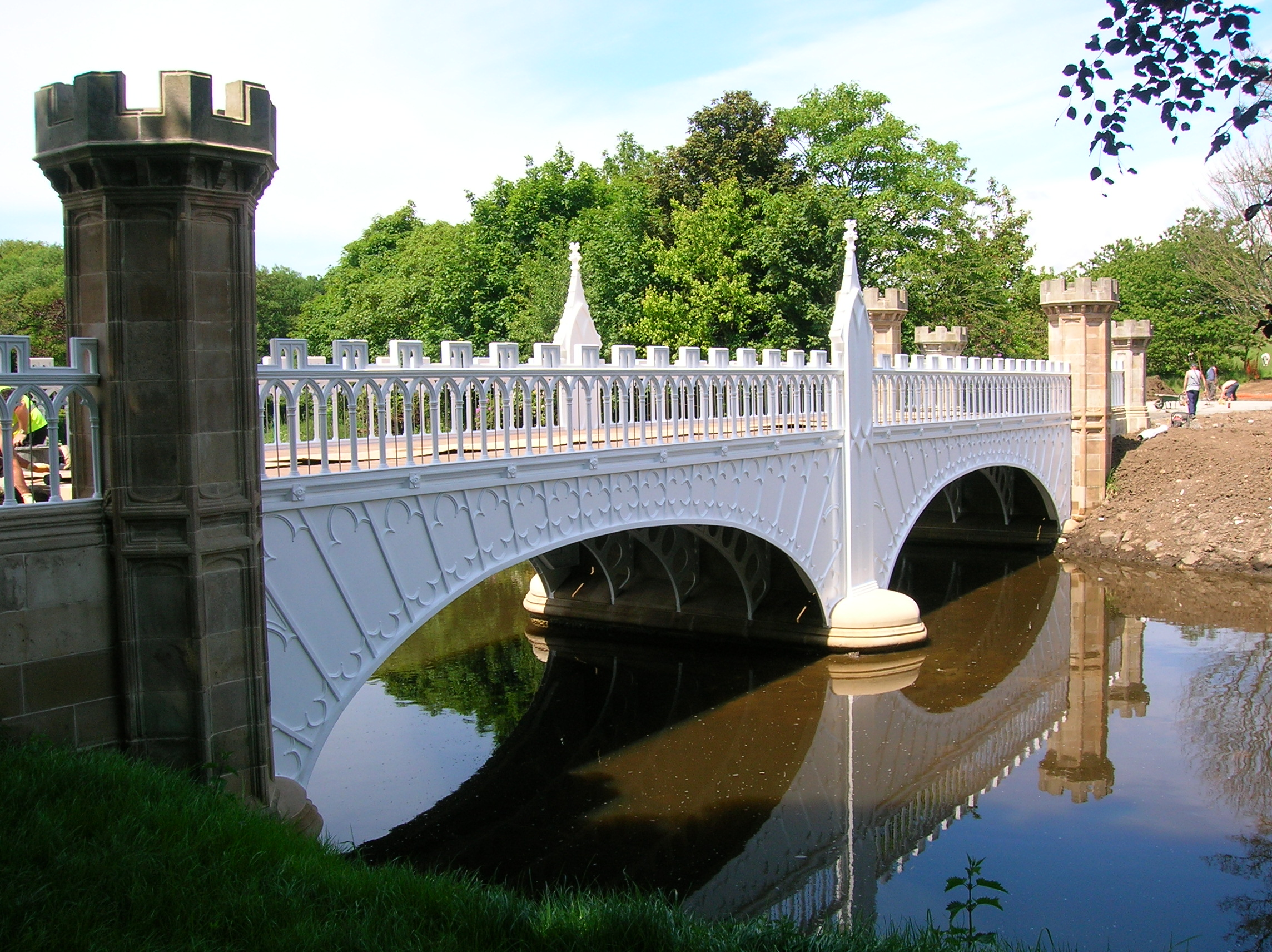
The completed bridge in June 2009

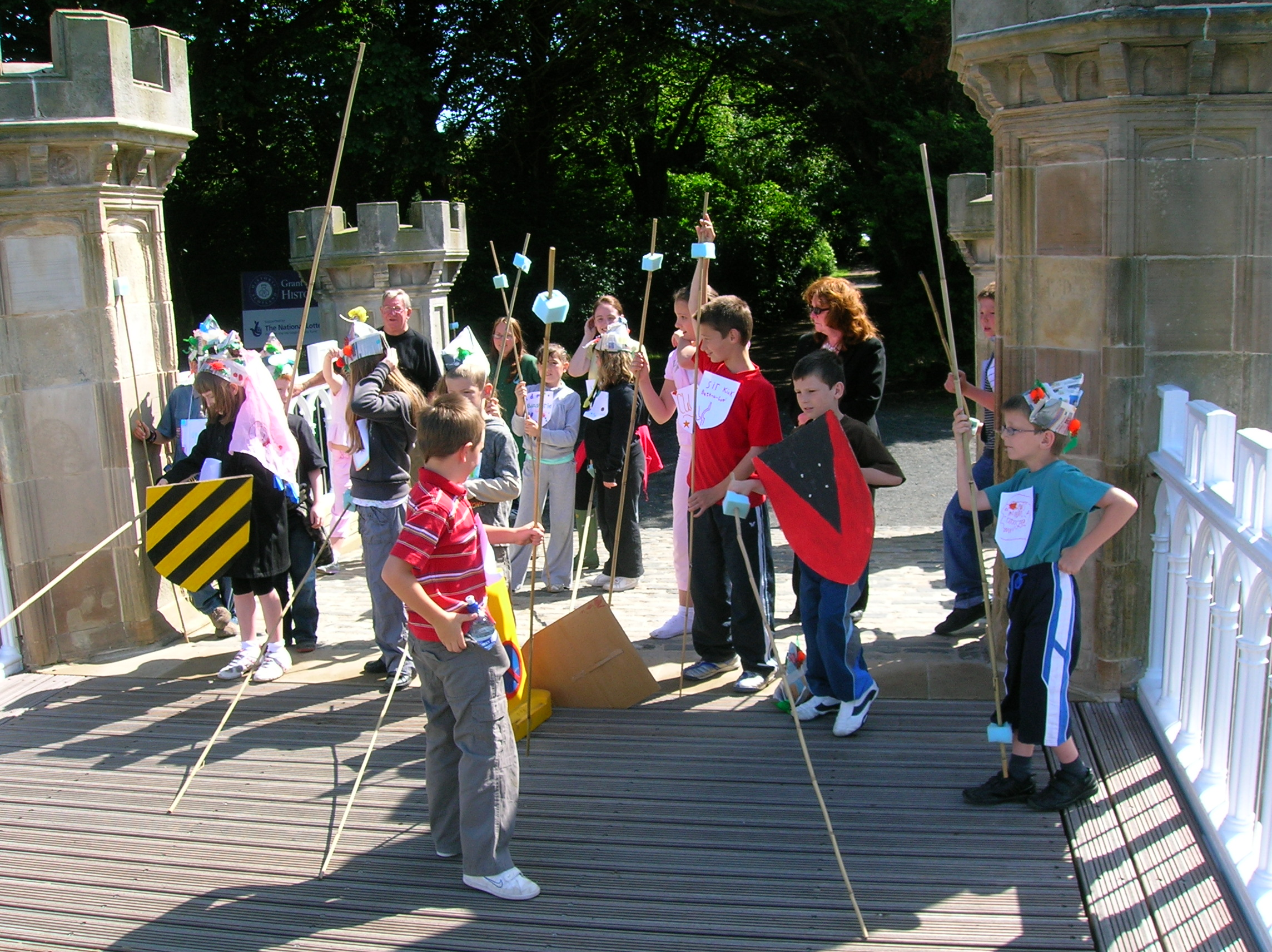
The restored bridge being used by the NAC Ranger Service

== See also ==
- The Iron Bridge – the world's first cast-iron arch bridge
- List of bridges in Scotland
