= Eglinton Trophy =

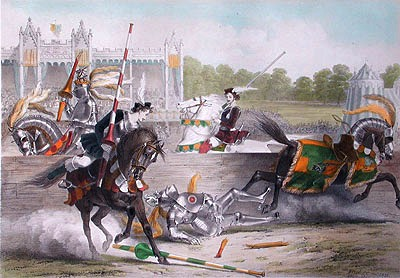
The joust between the Lord of the Eglinton Tournament and the Knight of the Red Rose

The Eglinton Trophy or Eglinton Testimonial is a Gothic style Sterling silver centrepiece presented by friends and admirers to the 13th Earl of Eglinton to commemorate the medieval re-enactment known as the Eglinton Tournament held at Eglinton Castle, Kilwinning, North Ayrshire in 1839. At 4 foot 8 inch (140 cm) in height and 1600 ounces (45 kg) in weight it is one of the largest and most extravagant trophies of its kind.

== History ==
=== Fund raising ===
A committee, including Lord Burghersh, and chaired by the Marquess of Londonderry, King of the Tournament, was formed to set up a subscription to "present Eglinton with a piece of plate, to commemorate the revival of the days of chivalry". Two hundred and thirty-nine people subscribed to the production of the trophy, each being limited to a maximum of twenty guineas (Circa £900 in modern terms).

=== Design and production ===
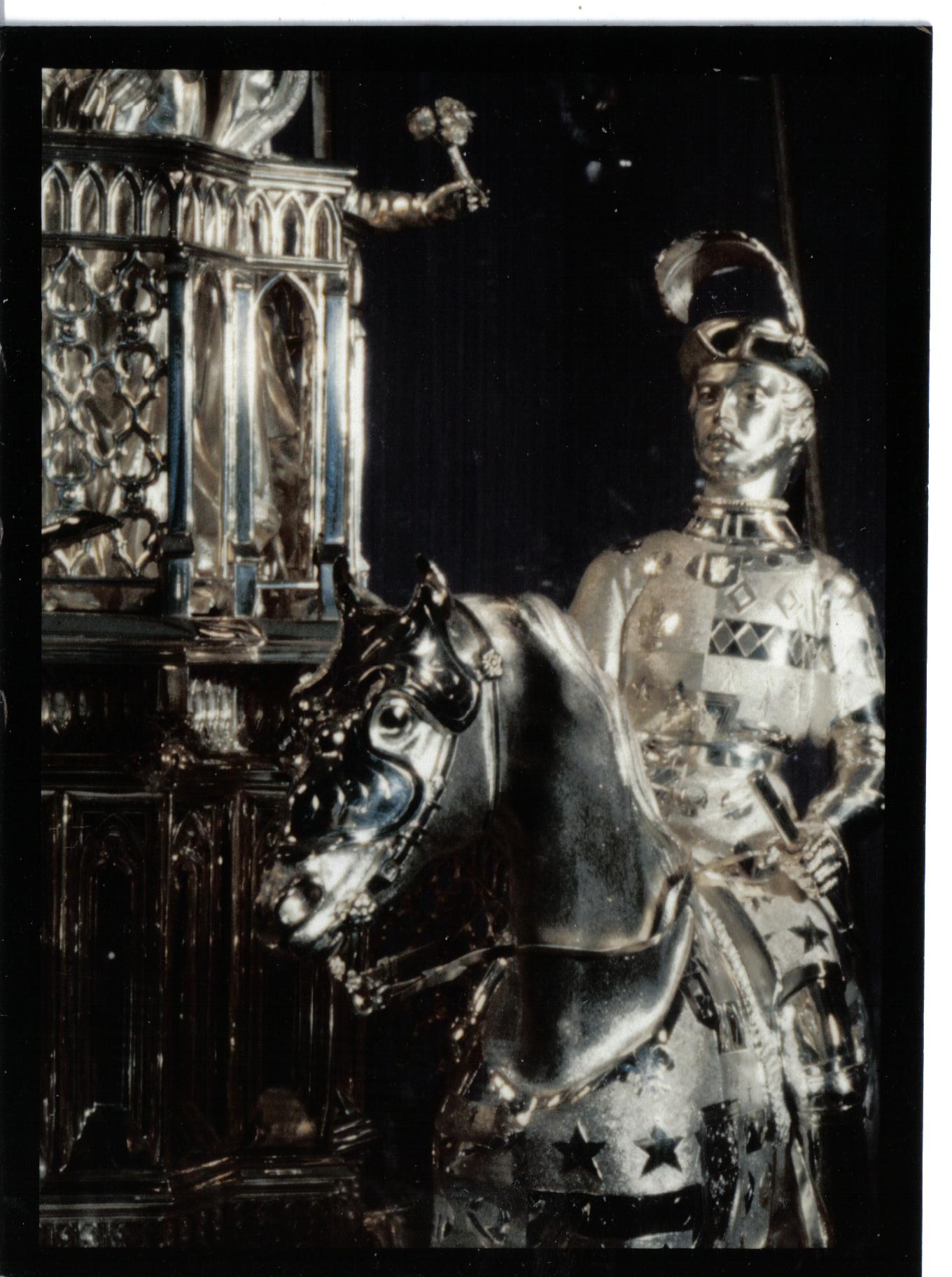
Detail of the Eglinton Trophy

A contemporary photograph showing the trophy in its case in the castle's library.

The 4 foot 8 inch (140 cm) high trophy, weighing in at 1600 ounces (45 kg), was designed by Edmund Cotterill (1795–1860), made in a medieval Gothic style by Messrs. R & S Garrard, Silversmiths of London at a cost then of £1,775 (£78,277 in modern terms) and took four years to complete.

Edmund Cotterill was in charge of the design studio at Garrards in 1843 and at the time of the Empire Exhibition (1851) he was said to stand "at the head of the class of artists who model for silversmiths and his productions, annually exhibited at Messrs Garrard, have earned that house a celebrity which no other can equal". The trophy is formed from modelled and cast silver components which were assembled together to create the final piece.

The Eglinton Trophy has a hallmark and is therefore silver and not silver plate. It rises from a wide crenelated base on the sides of which are located the shields bearing the coats of arms of the fourteen Knights of the Tournament; a fifteenth shield is blank and four of the shields are in alcoves that extend from the base, accompanied by swords, quills, coronets, laurel leaf crown, and so on. The 4 foot 8 inch (140 cm) trophy rises up as a highly ornate Gothic pulpit sitting beneath a pinnacled canopy under which Jane Georgiana, Lady Seymour, the Queen of Beauty stands in the act of placing a wreath upon the brow of the Earl of Eglinton, Lord and victor of the Eglinton Tournament.

Beside the figure of the earl are the Knight Marshal, Sir Charles Montolieu Lamb, with a dismounted squire, and a halbardier, his escort and the presentation party. Two hunting dogs are also present, together with two pages, one male and one female, and a lady in waiting. The squire and the lady in waiting give the impression of exchanging glances. A coat of arms is also displayed on a shield behind Lady Seymour.

The glass case that covers the trophy has wooded framed sections and rises up from an ornately carved eight-sided wooden base emblazoned with four coats of arms, earls coronets, and with a silver engraved dedicatory shield. This base stands around 2 feet and 10 inches (85 cm) in height. The dedicatory shield reads "Presented to Archibald, Earl of Eglinton, by the Visitors to the Eglinton Tournament held at Eglinton Castle. MDCCCXXXIX."

=== The Hallmark ===
A Hallmark is stamped on the base of the trophy, at the front. The Silver Standard Mark is a Lion passant indicating .925 purity, known as Sterling silver; the City Mark is an uncrowned Leopard indicating London as the city of manufacture, after the year 1822; the Maker's Mark is an "RG" beneath a Crown, indicating R & S Garrard after 1835 when James Garrard retired. The Crown indicates that the company had become official Crown Jewellers, an honour conferred on them by Queen Victoria in 1843; the Date Letter however is a Gothic "G" for the year 1842; and finally the Duty Mark stamp of Queen Victoria's head indicating that duty was paid on the item and that it was made before 1890.

The apparent disparity in dates just reflects the fact that the trophy was returned from the Assay Office in 1842 and finally assembled, completed and stamped by the maker for delivery to the committee and its presentation to the earl in 1843. The Maker's Mark is not in alignment with the official Hallmark, lying slightly above.

=== Use ===
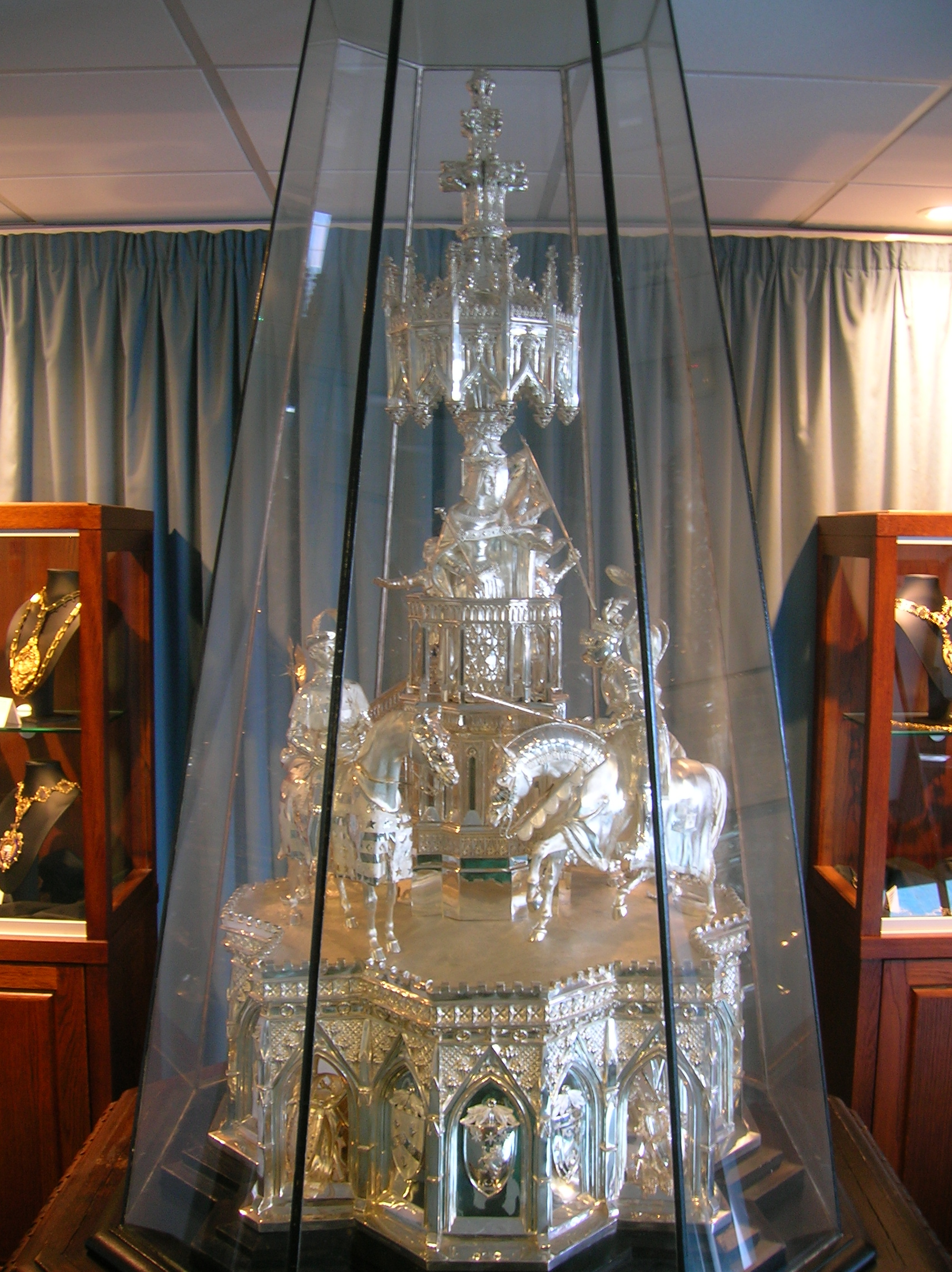
The Eglinton Trophy

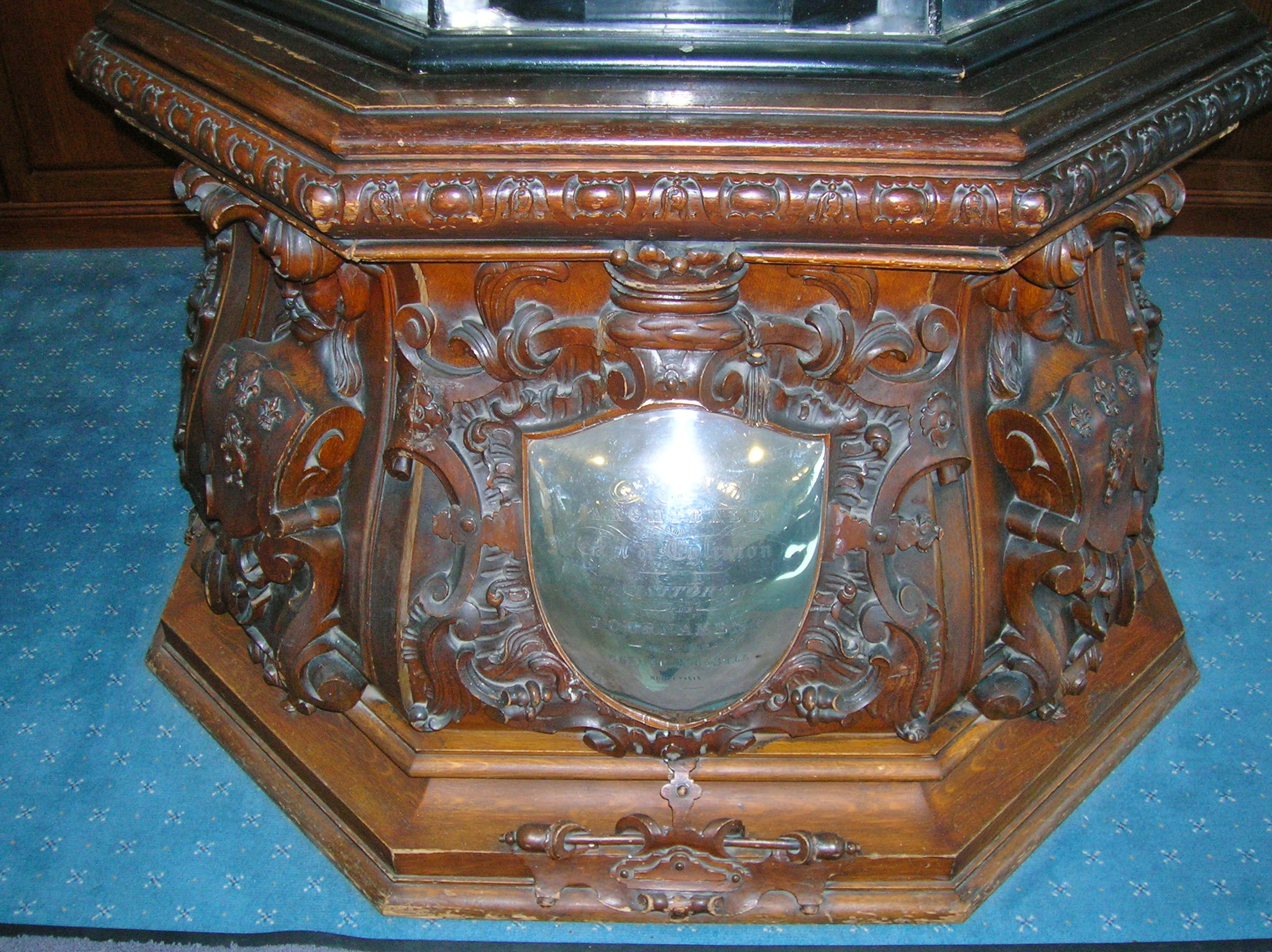
The trophy base and dedicatory plaque.

The trophy, presented to Archibald Montgomerie, 13th Earl of Eglinton in 1843, was originally housed within the library at Eglinton Castle and later at the Ayr County Hall in Ayr. It was featured and illustrated in The Illustrated London News of June 1843. The trophy is now kept, housed within its original glass and wood case, in Cunninghame House, headquarters of North Ayrshire Council, having been loaned to the people of Ayrshire by the 14th Earl it is however still the property of the present Earl of Eglinton.

For a while during the construction of the headquarters of the then Cunninghame District Council it was housed at Wellwood, the home of the Irvine Burns Club and the official Royal Burgh of Irvine Museum.

It was moved to the Eglinton Country Park visitor centre in 1989 for the re-enactment that marked 150 years since the tournament and was also loaned to the Victoria and Albert Museum. It is insured by North Ayrshire Council for an undisclosed, but considerable sum, and was lent to East Ayrshire Council for a short time in 2011 (April 30 to August 20) as the centrepiece to an exhibition of James Henry Nixons (1802–1857) Eglinton Tournament prints at the Dick Institute in Kilmarnock.

The trophy is of great significance to the local and social history of the area and can be viewed by small groups during normal working hours by prior arrangement, after going through appropriate security procedures.

== Other Eglinton Tournament trophies ==
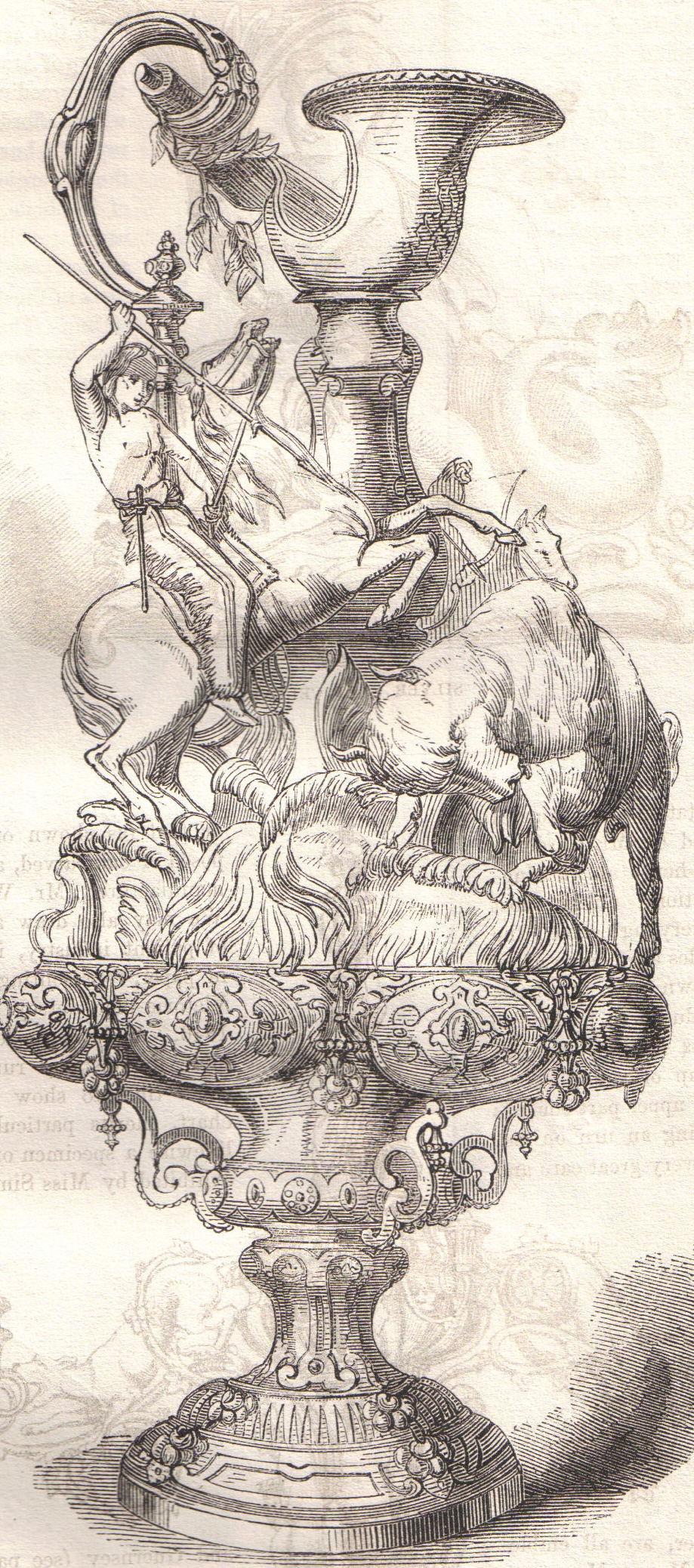
A silver Ewer or Race Cup by Edmund Cotterill.

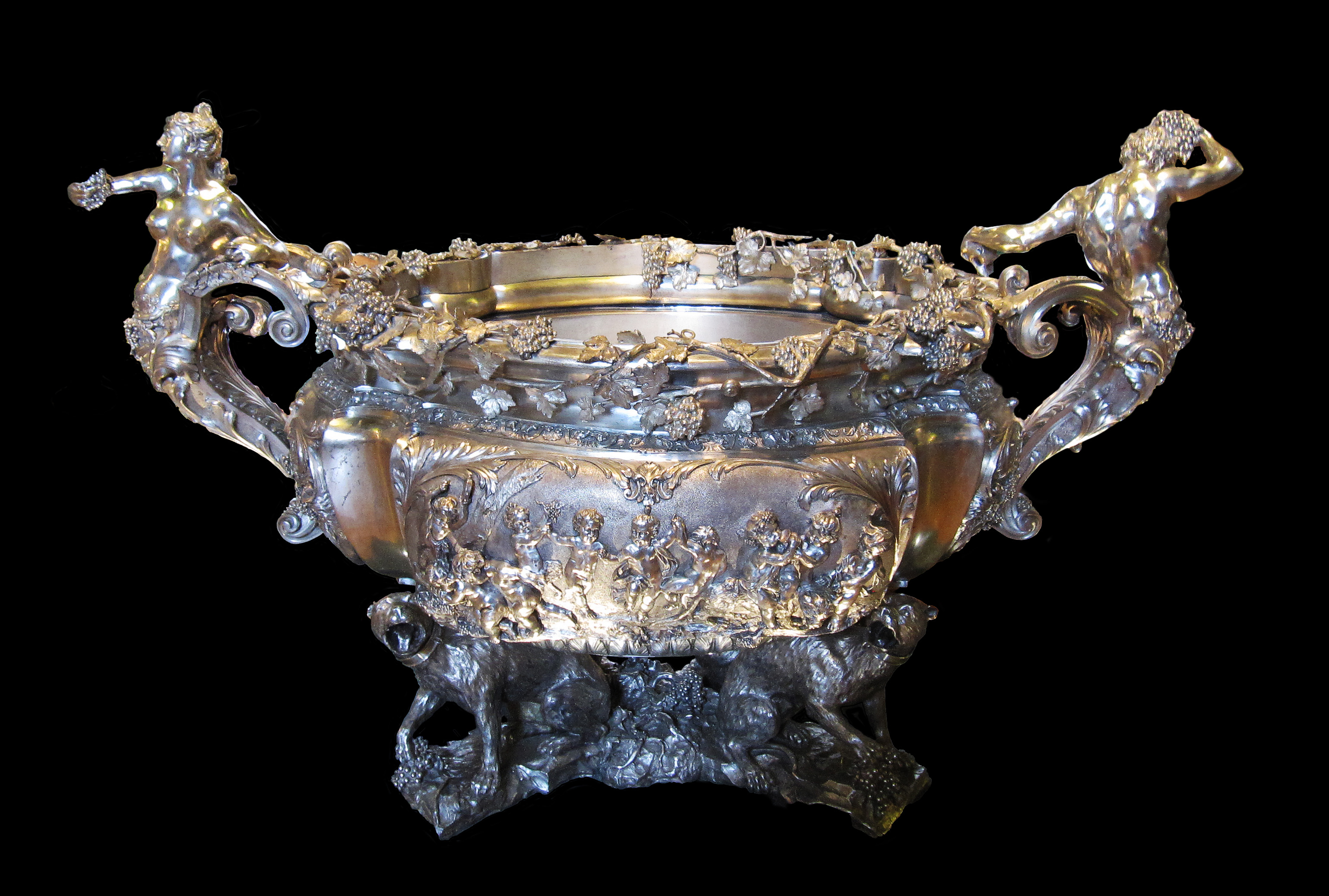
The Jerningham Wine Cooler made by Elkington's.

A second silver trophy was presented to the Earl by 300 citizens of Glasgow. In 2014 a silver statuette measuring 44 cm in height representing a knight in full armour with a jousting lance and a horse bearing the Earl of Eglinton's coat of arms was acquired by the East Ayrshire Leisure Trust on behalf of East Ayrshire Council. It is believed this is the only surviving part of the "second silver trophy" and that the rest of the candelabrum was melted down for its silver content after it was sold by the Earl of Eglinton in the 1920s. The silver hallmark shows that the statuette dates to 1840, three years before the Eglinton Trophy was completed. The silversmiths were Benjamin Smith III of London and D.C.Rait of Glasgow.

== Bibliography ==
1. Eglinton Tournament 1839 (1989). Irvine Development Corporation.
