= Edmund Cotterill =

British sculptor and designer (1795–1858)

Edmund Mingay Cotterill
- Born: 25 September 1794; London, England
- Died: 1860 (aged 65–66)
- Occupations: Sculptor, modeller, designer
- Employer(s): Garrard & Co.
- Known for: Elaborate sculptural groups and centrepieces in bronze and silver, with equestrian, Moorish or Arab themes

Edmund Cotterill (1794 –1860) was a British sculptor and the head of the leading London silversmith Garrard & Co's design department, where he established the company's reputation for producing elaborate sculptural groups and centerpieces in bronze and silver. Cotterill's work was highly regarded by critics and the public, as he excelled not only in modelling figures but also animals and the interaction of the group as a whole.

== Early life and career ==
Cotterill attended the Royal Academy Schools in 1820 and exhibited there from 1822 to 1858, the British Institution from 1832 to 1855, and the Suffolk Street Galleries from 1829 to 1836. According to the Illustrated London News, Cotterill stood "at the head of the class of artists who model for silversmiths", and his annual exhibitions at Garrard earned the company a level of celebrity that no other could match.

== Career at Garrard ==
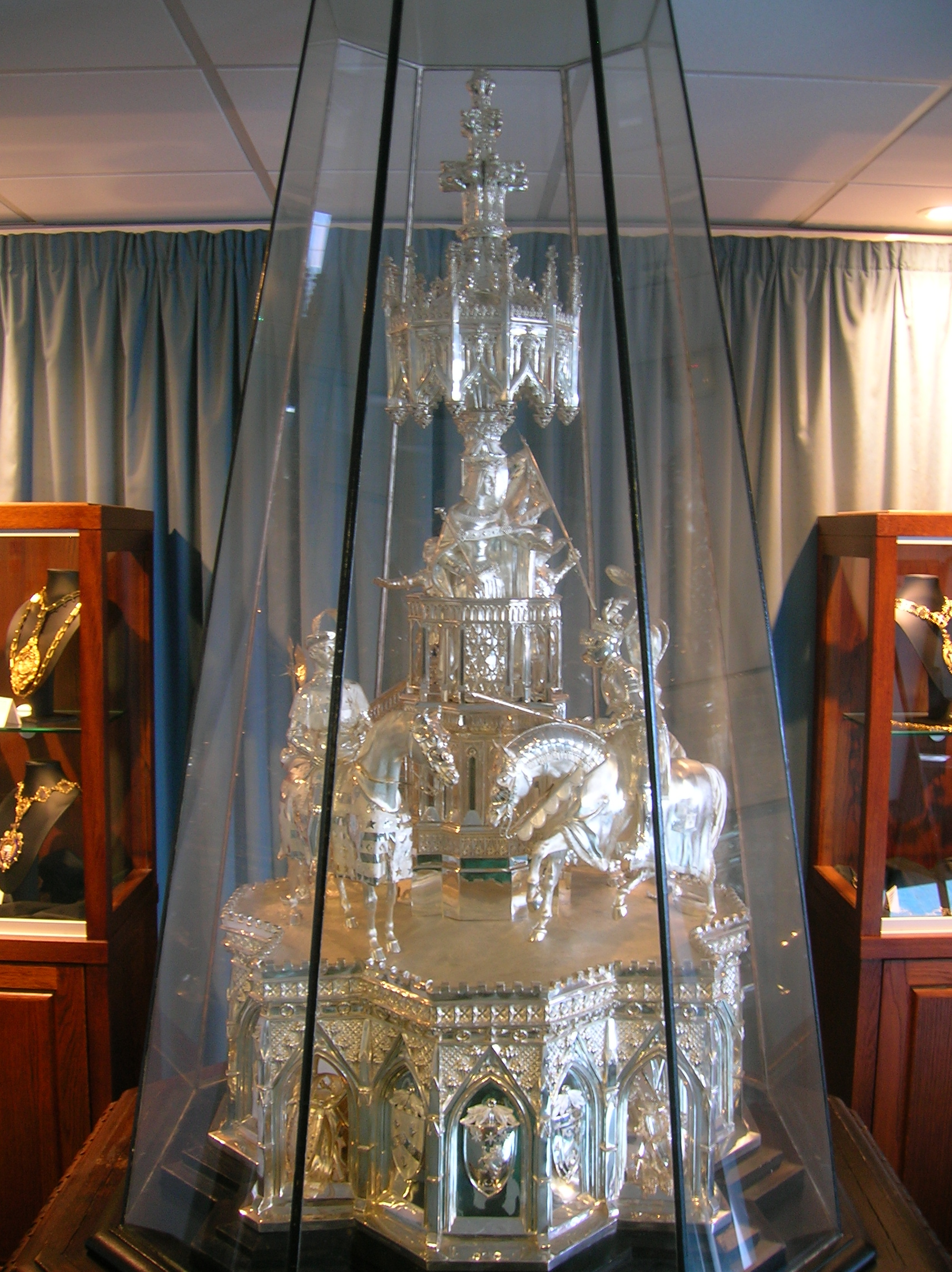
The Eglinton Trophy. At 4 feet 8 inches (140 cm) in height and 1600 ounces (45 kg) in weight, it is one of the largest and most extravagant trophies of its kind.

Cotterill worked for Garrard from 1833 until his death and was responsible for a number of ambitious sculptural groups, including the Emperor's Plate, which was produced each year from 1849 to 1852. Many of his designs incorporated horses, which he excelled at modelling, and were often inspired by Moorish or Arab equestrian themes.

During this time Garrard produced sculptures, centerpieces and well-known trophies of sporting events: Ascot, Eglinton Trophy, Doncaster, Goodwood Cups and The America's Cup, 1848.

Cotterill's trophies were highly regarded by critics and the public, and his sculptural groups at the Great Exhibition of 1851 were considered one of the sections not to be missed. Garrard was awarded a prize for a piece by Cotterill at the exhibition

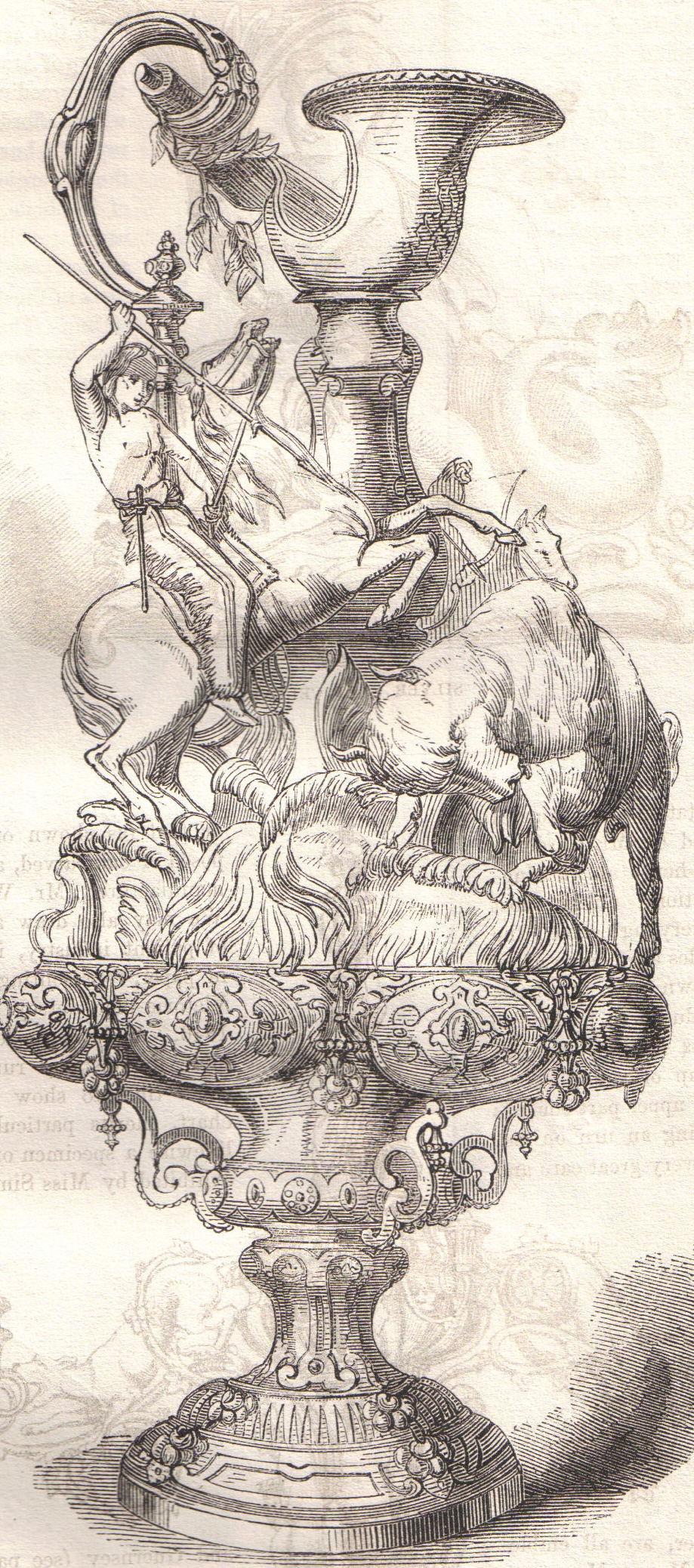
A silver ewer or race cup by Garrards of Haysmarket. Edmund Cotterill designer.

== Legacy ==
In 1840, Prince Albert employed Cotterill to make a model of his greyhound Eos, which was later used as a centrepiece produced in 1842/3 and exhibited at the Annual Exhibition of British Manufacturies, now in the Victoria & Albert Museum.

Cotterill's legacy continues to live on through his work, which is highly sought after by collectors and art enthusiasts. Cotterill was a master of modelling figures and animals, and his intricate sculptural groups made him a significant figure in the world of British sculpture.

== Exhibitions ==
- Exhibition of the Royal Academy of Arts, The Eighty-Fourth, 1852
- Exhibition of the Royal Academy of Arts (Summer Exhibition), 1768-1822 - 1858 Exhibited four times from 1851 (15 times prior to that), usually one or two works per year, about 28 works in all.
- Exhibited at Garrard, where he created a number of ambitious sculptural groups. These were highly regarded by critics and the public, as they were considered to be among the highlights of the Great Exhibition of 1851.

== Recognition ==
Awarded the Freedom of the City of London in 1807.
