= Eglinton Tournament =

1839 medieval tournament reenactment in Scotland

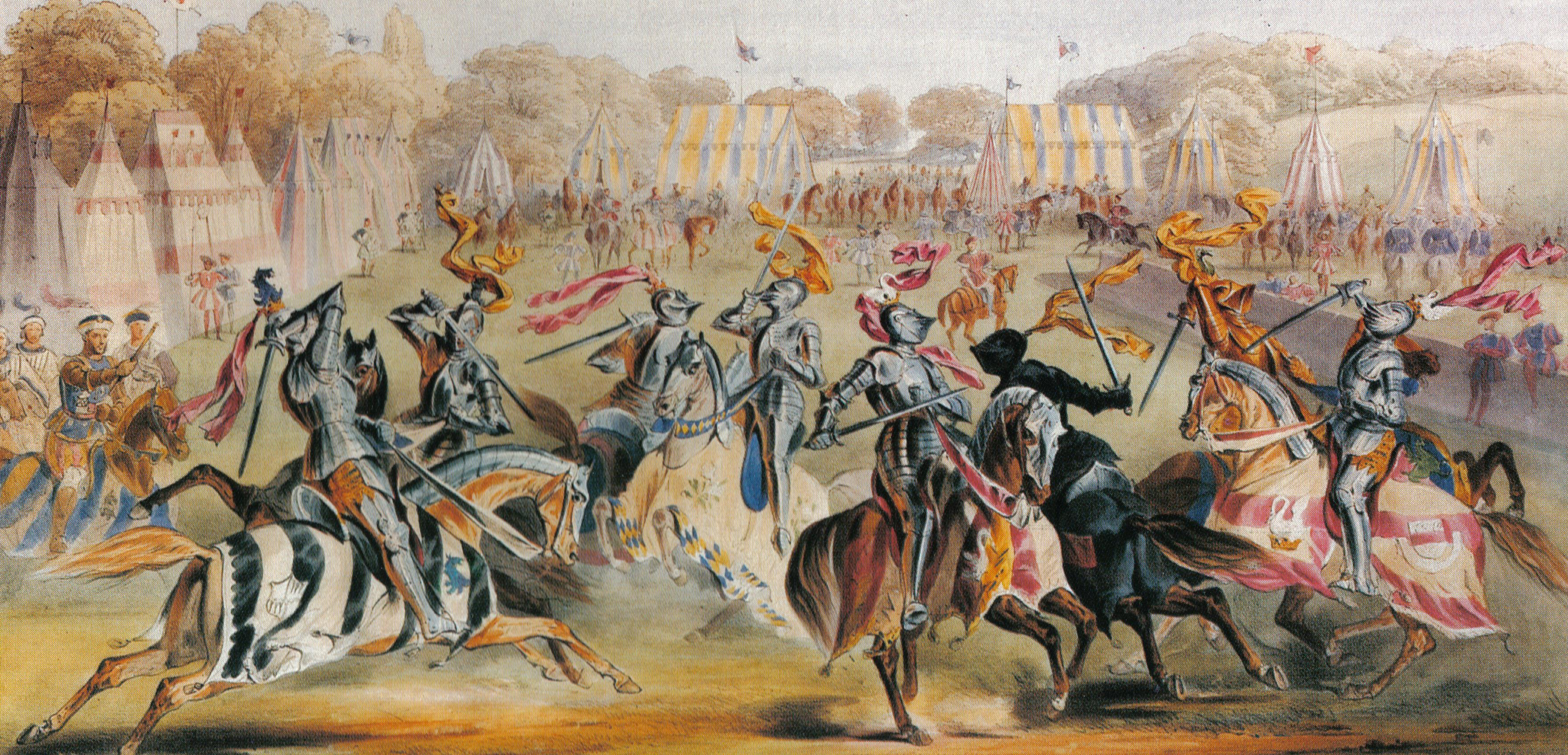
Eglinton Tournament of 1839 by James Henry Nixon in 1839

The Eglinton Tournament of 1839 was a reenactment of a medieval joust and revel held in North Ayrshire, Scotland between 28 and 30 August. It was funded and organized by Archibald, Earl of Eglinton, and took place at Eglinton Castle in Ayrshire. The Queen of Beauty was Georgiana, Duchess of Somerset. Many distinguished visitors took part, including Prince Louis Napoleon, the future Emperor of the French.

The Tournament was a deliberate act of Romanticism, and drew 100,000 spectators. It is primarily known now for the ridicule poured on it by the Whigs. Problems were caused by rainstorms. At the time views were mixed:

Whatever opinion may be formed of the success of the Tournament, as an imitation of ancient manners and customs, we heard only one feeling of admiration expressed at the gorgeousness of the whole scene, considered only as a pageant. Even on Wednesday, when the procession was seen to the greatest possible disadvantage, the dullest eye glistened with delight as the lengthy and stately train swept into the marshalled lists.

Participants had undergone regular training.

The preparations, and the many works of art commissioned for or inspired by the Eglinton Tournament, had an effect on public feeling and the course of 19th-century Gothic revivalism. Its ambition carried over to events such as the lavish Tournament of Brussels in 1905, and presaged the historical reenactments of the present. Features of the tournament were actually inspired by Walter Scott's novel Ivanhoe: it was attempting "to be a living re-enactment of the literary romances". In Eglinton's own words "I am aware of the manifold deficiencies in its exhibition — more perhaps than those who were not so deeply interested in it; I am aware that it was a very humble imitation of the scenes which my imagination had portrayed, but I have, at least, done something towards the revival of chivalry".

While others made a profit, Lord Eglinton had to absorb losses. The Earl's granddaughter, Viva Montgomerie recalled in her memoirs that "he had spent most of the wealth of the estate".

== Background ==
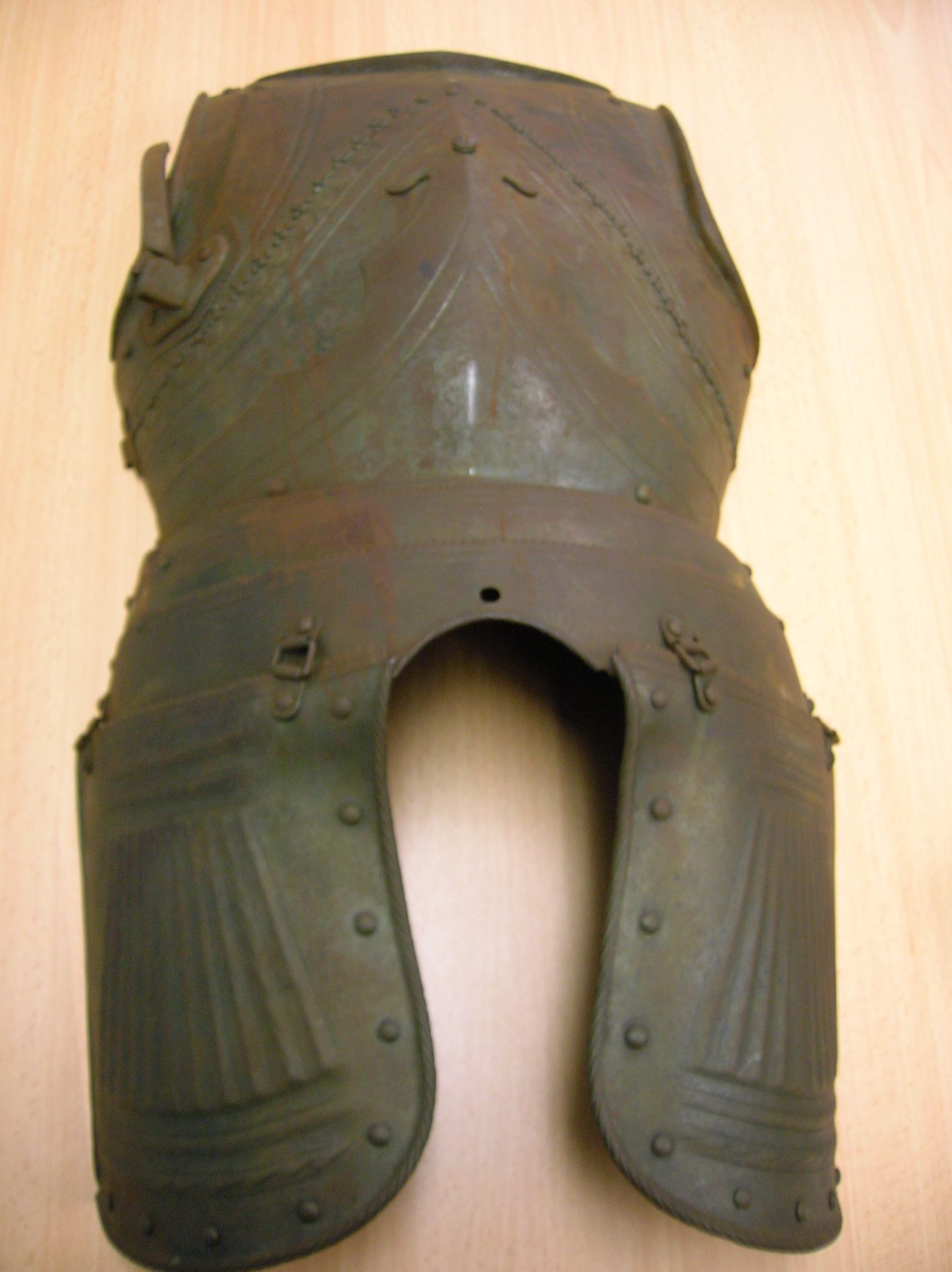
An item of a knight's armour from the 1839 tournament

The Gothic Revival and the rise of Romanticism of the late 18th and early 19th centuries were an international phenomenon. Medieval-style jousts, for example, were regularly held in Sweden between 1777 and 1800. Gothic novels, such as The Castle of Otranto, by Horace Walpole (1717–1797) and the many works of Sir Walter Scott popularised the idea of passionate romanticism and praise of chivalric ideals. Walpole himself was one of the first in England to renovate his mansion into a mock-Gothic castle, Strawberry Hill (1749–1777).

Medieval culture was widely admired as an antidote to the modern enlightenment and industrial age. Plays and theatrical works (such as Ivanhoe, which in 1820 was playing in six different productions in London alone) perpetuated the romanticism of knights, castles, feasts and tournaments. Caspar David Friedrich (1774–1840) of Germany painted magnificent Gothic ruins and spiritual allegories. Jane Austen (1775–1815) wrote her novel Northanger Abbey (written 1798, published 1817) as a satire on romantic affectation.

The Montgomerie family had a romantic tale of chivalry which bound them to the idea of a revival of such ideals, this being the acquisition of the pennon and spear of Harry Hotspur, aka Sir Henry Percy, at the Battle of Otterburn by a Montgomerie. The price for Hotspur's release was the building of the castle of Polnoon in Eaglesham, Renfrewshire for the Montgomeries. It is said that the Duke of Northumberland, head of the Percy family, made overtures for the return of the pennon in 1839 and was given the answer, "There's as good lea land at Eglinton as ever there was at Chevy Chase (Otterburn); let Percy come and take them."

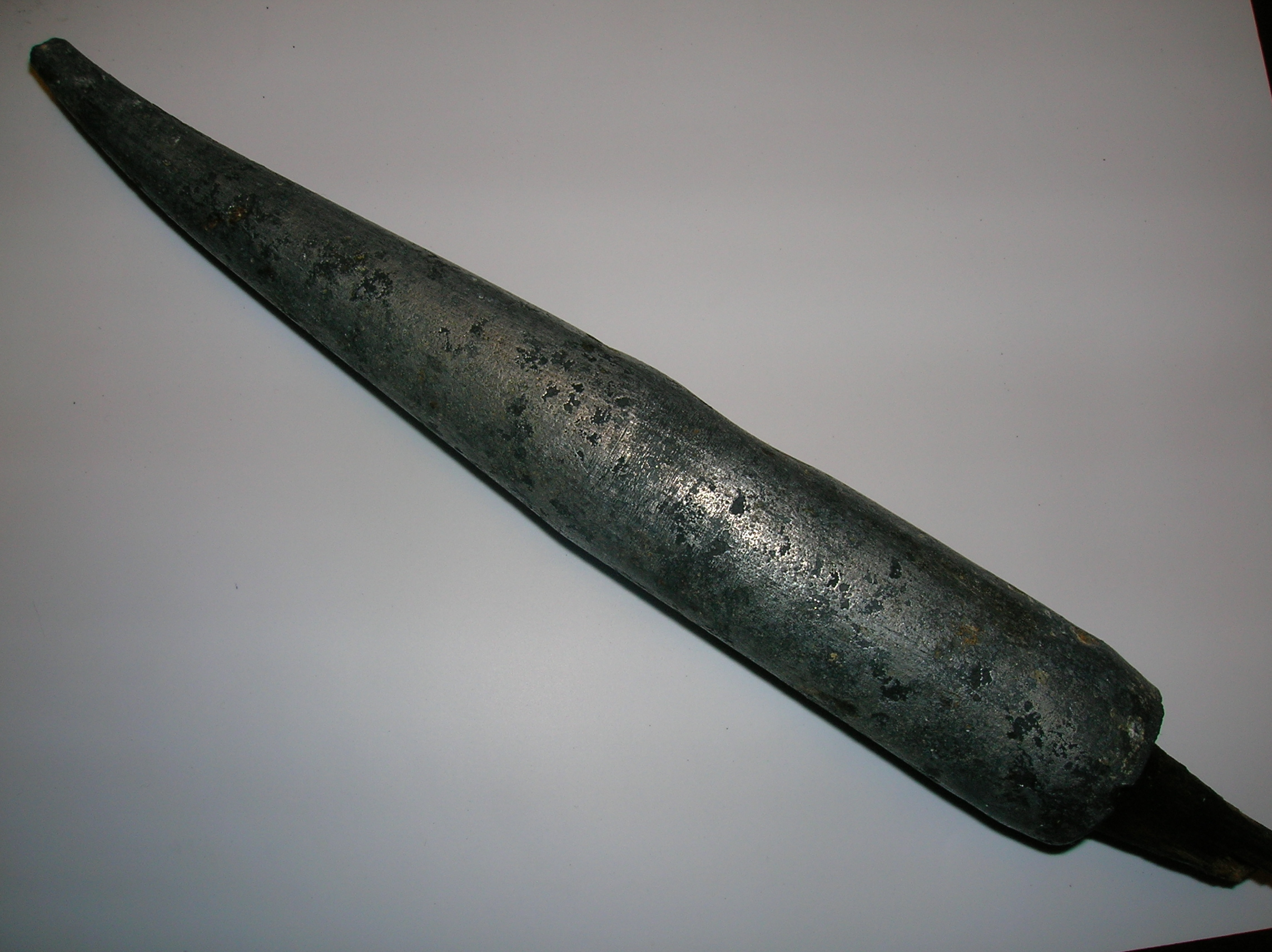
A lance or gonfalon tip from the Eglinton Tournament as found in the nearby Lugton Water in 2008

In 1838 Whig Prime Minister Lord Melbourne announced that the coronation of Queen Victoria would not include the traditional medieval-style banquet in Westminster Hall. Seeking to disempower the monarchy in particular and romantic ideology and politics in general was a normal activity for the Whig party, so, in the face of recession, the more obviously anachronistic parts of the coronation celebrations would be considered an extravagance. Furthermore, memories of embarrassing mishap at George IV's Westminster Hall banquet were still fresh; uproar having resulted when, at the end of the proceedings, people tried to obtain valuable tableware as souvenirs. King William IV had cancelled his banquet to prevent a repeat. Although there was some popular support for government refusal to hold the traditional event, there were "many complaints and various public struggles, as well as on the part of the antiquaries, as on that of the tradesmen of the metropolis". Critics referred to Victoria's slimmed-down coronation scornfully as "The Penny Crowning". Despite attempts to achieve economies, contemporary accounts point out that Victoria's coronation in fact cost £20,000 more than that of George IV. Nevertheless, her coronation did feature an innovation: the procession from the palace to Westminster Abbey, which was very popular.

However, it was not just the ancient Great Feast itself which had been cancelled but also other rituals which traditionally were not paid for by the state anyway such as the throwing down of the gauntlet by the Queen's Champion, and his symbolic presentation to her of two falcons. "Obeisance to the past was in 1839 was not just a fad; for some, it was an urgent need". Lord Eglinton's own stepfather, Sir Charles Lamb, as Knight Marshal of the Royal Household, would have led his horse into the Great Hall of Westminster as part of one of these colourful and widely loved rituals. On 4 August 1838, the "Court Journal" printed a rumour that the Earl of Eglinton, was going to host a great jousting tournament at his castle in Scotland. It has been speculated that it was Sir Charles or his son who suggested to Lord Eglinton that he should provide the nation with its missing rites of passage by holding a great mediaeval festival himself, but whatever the details, within a few weeks Eglinton had confirmed the rumour true.

At first the suggestion was that mediaeval games would be held at the next private race meeting at Eglinton, including the ceremony of the challenge carried out by a knight clad in armour.

== Preparation ==
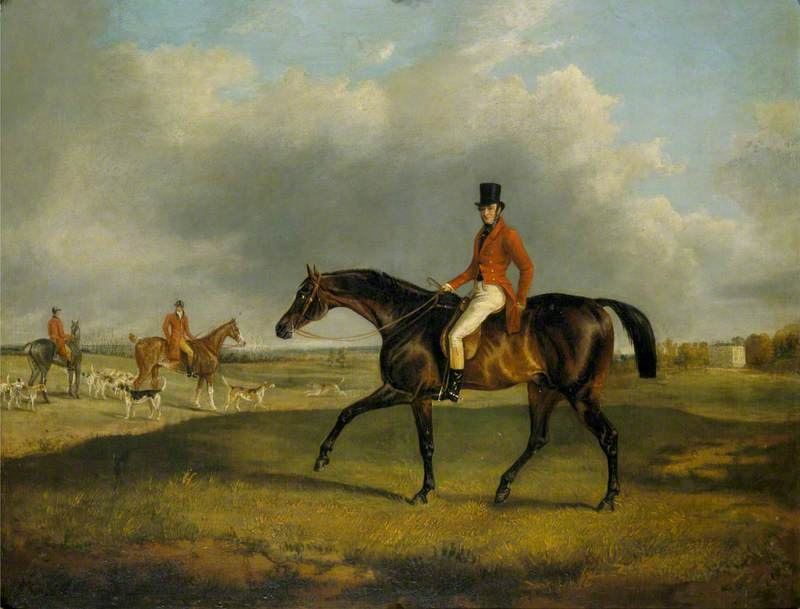
Archibald Montgomerie, the 13th Earl of Eglinton

In autumn of 1838 one-hundred and fifty prospective knights met in the showroom of Samuel Pratt, a dealer in medieval armor at No. 47 Bond Street, London. Many backed out when they realised the astronomical costs and difficulties, but "about forty" were determined to try regardless. Pratt was to be in charge of all the arrangements, the pavilions and armour, banners, decor and costumes. He also would supply the stands, marquees and great tents for the feast and ball. Although all the armour supplied by Pratt was supposed to have been genuinely medieval, it is unclear how many of the suits actually were; the only armour that was kept track of, that of the 3rd Marquess of Waterford, on display in 1963 at Windsor Castle, is a pastiche.

The dress rehearsals were held in London at a garden behind the Eyre Arms, St John's Wood, a tavern close to Regent's Park, the last one on Saturday 13 July 1839. Nineteen knights participated. The audience was invitation only; many of "the very elite of the most elite" (said the "Court Journal") were invited to watch, and 2,690 attended. The rehearsal went perfectly. The weather was sunny, the banners and armour and tents impressive, the jousting successful. Even critics conceded that the tournament was likely to be a fine show.

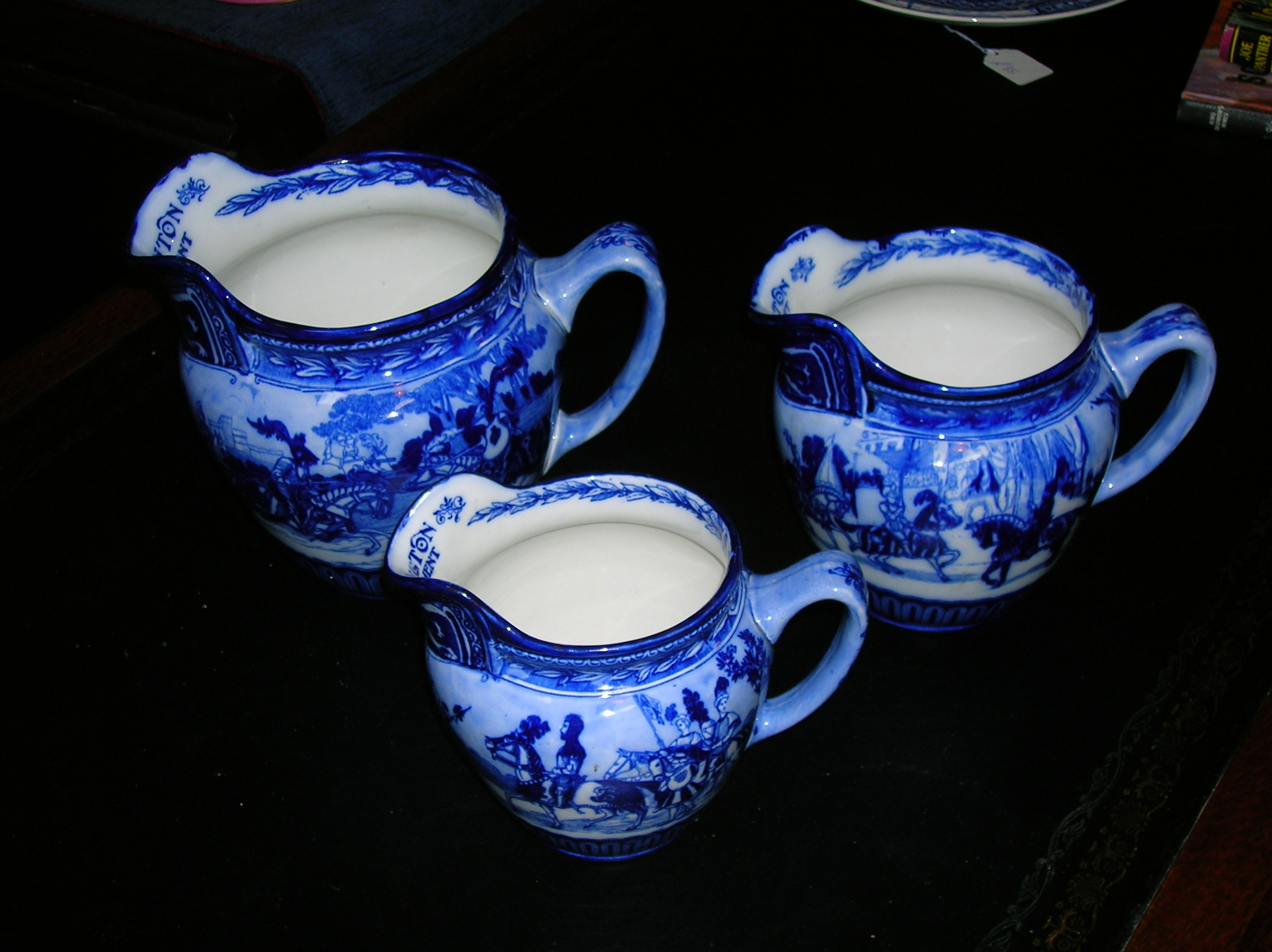
A set of commemorative jugs.

Mass-production of memorabilia copies of artworks commissions for the tournament demonstrated that it was not only upper-class Britain that took notice. Tories eyed antique armour and dreamed of courtly love, and Queen Victoria twice noted in her diary that she had discussed the tournament with Lord Melbourne and although her view was that the event would be a foolish amusement, the choice of the Duchess of Somerset as Queen of Beauty was to her liking. With only two months to live, Lady Flora Hastings wrote in 1839 to her mother on the subject of the upcoming Eglinton Tournament, expressing her concern that one of the knights might be killed in the violent sport.

On the other hand, the Whigs, the social reformers, and the Utilitarians expressed outrage at such a fantasy at a time when the economy was in a shambles, when poverty was rampant and many workers were starving. Emotions ran high, with satirical cartoons, insults and passions aroused on both sides, the Whigs calling the Tories wastrels and the Tories calling the Whigs heartless. Whatever Eglinton's original intent, the tournament was symbolic of romantic defiance in the face of the spirit of revolution that was frightening so much of old guard Europe during the second quarter of the 19th century.

== Visitors ==
Lord Eglinton announced that the public would be welcome; he requested medieval fancy dress, if possible, and tickets were free but would have to be applied for. Expecting a healthy turnout — the Eglinton race meetings generally got local audiences of up to 1500 — he made arrangements for grandstands for the guests and comfortable seating for the expected crowd of about 4000. He notified the press (The Times, the Morning Post, the Court Gazette, and "the other important or popular journals") of the offer of free tickets to all.

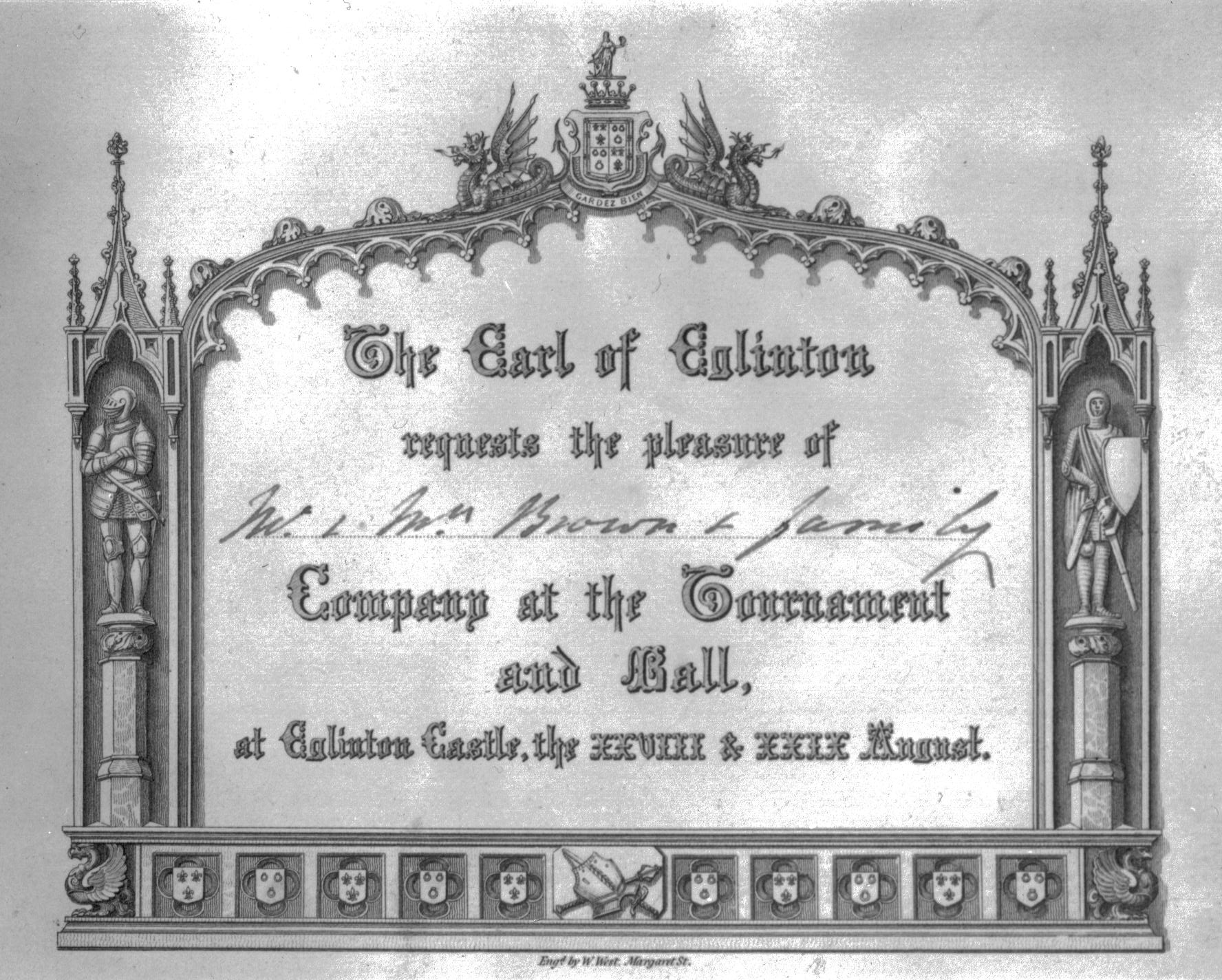
An official invitation.

The response returned from across the social spectrum: readers of the Bath Figaro, the Cornish Guardian, the Sheffield Iris, the Wisbech Star in the East and many other newspapers — readers "from every county in the British Isles" — applied to Lord Eglinton for tickets. Through the month of August letters came by the hundreds into Castle Eglinton requesting tickets for parties of twenty, fifty, a hundred people.

A scrapbook of nearly a thousand of these letters still survives, filled with pleas, anecdotes, promises of medieval dress, and assertions of Tory sympathies. Lord Eglinton accepted the challenge, issued the requested tickets and planned for a vastly larger effort.

With a turnout two orders of magnitude greater than expected (the final estimate was a crowd of one hundred thousand), area transport and lodgings were overwhelmed. The nearby town of Irvine had only one hotel. Private homes were able to charge very high prices to take in the tourists. On the morning of the tournament the roads to Eglinton Castle were quickly jammed. The road from Ayr to Glasgow (thirty miles long) was filled end to end, and every approach was blocked by abandoned carriages, their owners continuing on foot. The new railway from Ayr to Irvine had just opened to the public on 5 August 1839, and it now charged thrice the normal fee; people fought for the tickets, as it was the only transport guaranteed to deposit them only a few miles from the castle. Some poor folk without lodgings are said to have spent the first night beneath the grandstand or even in hollow tree-trunks.

One visitor who travelled from London took steam trains from London to Liverpool, where he boarded a paddle steamer packed with people attending the tournament, its deck heavily laden with boxes, armour, lances and horses of participants. They landed at Ardrossan pier, terminus of the horse-drawn Ardrossan and Johnstone Railway: "Disembarking, we seized upon a sort of carriage which plied upon a coal train and carried a large assortment of passengers, all drawn by one horse, and set out for the little town of Irvine. Dismounting thence, we changed after a time into divers coaches and cars, and turning into a romantic and wooded road, passed close by the lodge of the Castle of the Lord of the Tourney." After looking round the busy preparations, he returned to Irvine and found lodgings in a private house across the street from Seagate Castle, then next morning made his way to the tournament.

== The Tournament ==
=== 28 August ===
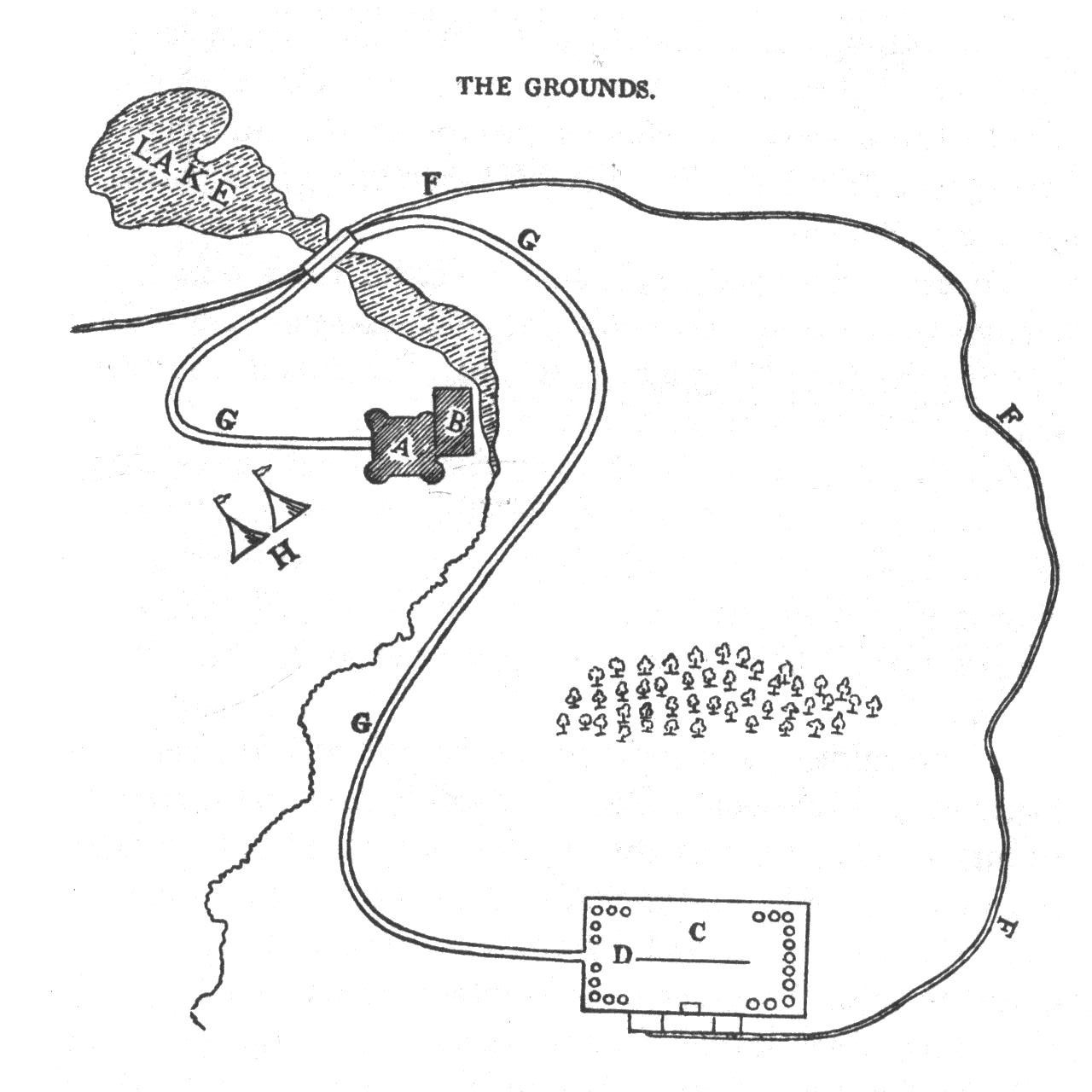
A map showing the layout of the various features associated with the Eglinton Tournament. Note the lakes either side of the bridge, formed around 1800.

The tournament was held near Eglinton Castle, eight miles from the west coast of Scotland in Ayrshire, an imitation Gothic, an 18th-century Georgian mansion with battlements and turrets added. The event took place on a meadow or holm at a loop in the Lugton Water. The ground chosen for the tournament was low, almost marshy, with grassy slopes rising on all sides. The Knights on horseback and their retinue reached the tilt yard ('C' on the map) via an enclosed ride ('G' on the map), whilst the guests and visitors made their way to the stands via the route marked 'F' on the map illustrated. Both groups crossed over the three arched Gothic Eglinton Tournament Bridge. An 1837 map of Eglinton Castle, Grounds and Tilt yard shows that the tilt yard was already in existence at this early date, but it is not recorded what its fate was after the tournament was over.

A great parade of knights was supposed to open the tournament at noon. The knights had had little practice mounting their horses and took a long time to get prepared. Then each knight and his entourage (forty different groups) was supposed to ride to the castle, pick up a lady, officer, or knight, and return to the lists. But there was only one drive to and from the castle, so that the knights had to jostle back and forth past and through each other. There had been no arrangement for parade control, and the knightly gridlock took hours longer to unfold than had been planned. Elaborate rehearsals and training in St John's Wood had not prepared participants for the crowded and already sodden conditions on the day. By the time the parade was ready, it was a half mile long and over three hours late.

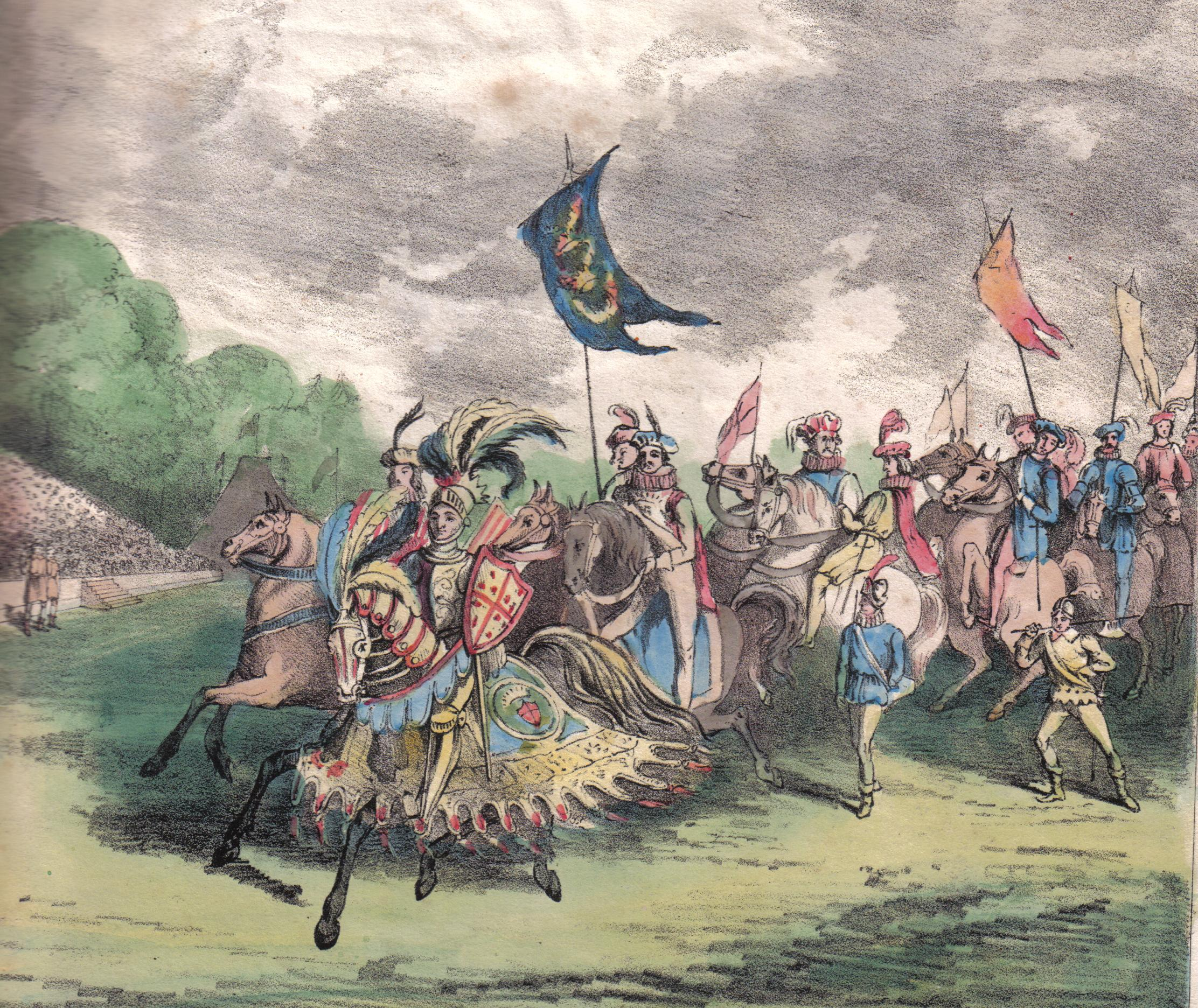
The procession passing the Queen's Gallery.

The opening parade comprised forty knights, each with his own entourage who were to ride to the castle, picked up a lady, officer or knight, and returned to the lists, the picturesque estate drive being lined with thousands of spectators.

Although the day had dawned clear and fine, as the knights and their entourages struggled to organise the parade the sky began to darken. Just at the moment when the parade was finally arranged — just as Lady Somerset, the Queen of Beauty, was heralded by trumpets — there was a flash of lightning, a great crash of thunder, and the black clouds of Ayrshire let loose with a sudden and violent rainstorm.

Lord Eglinton immediately ordered the ladies into carriages, but the knights and their entourages, soon soaked in the squall and covered in mud, marched into the lists down a parade route lined by the umbrella bearing audience.

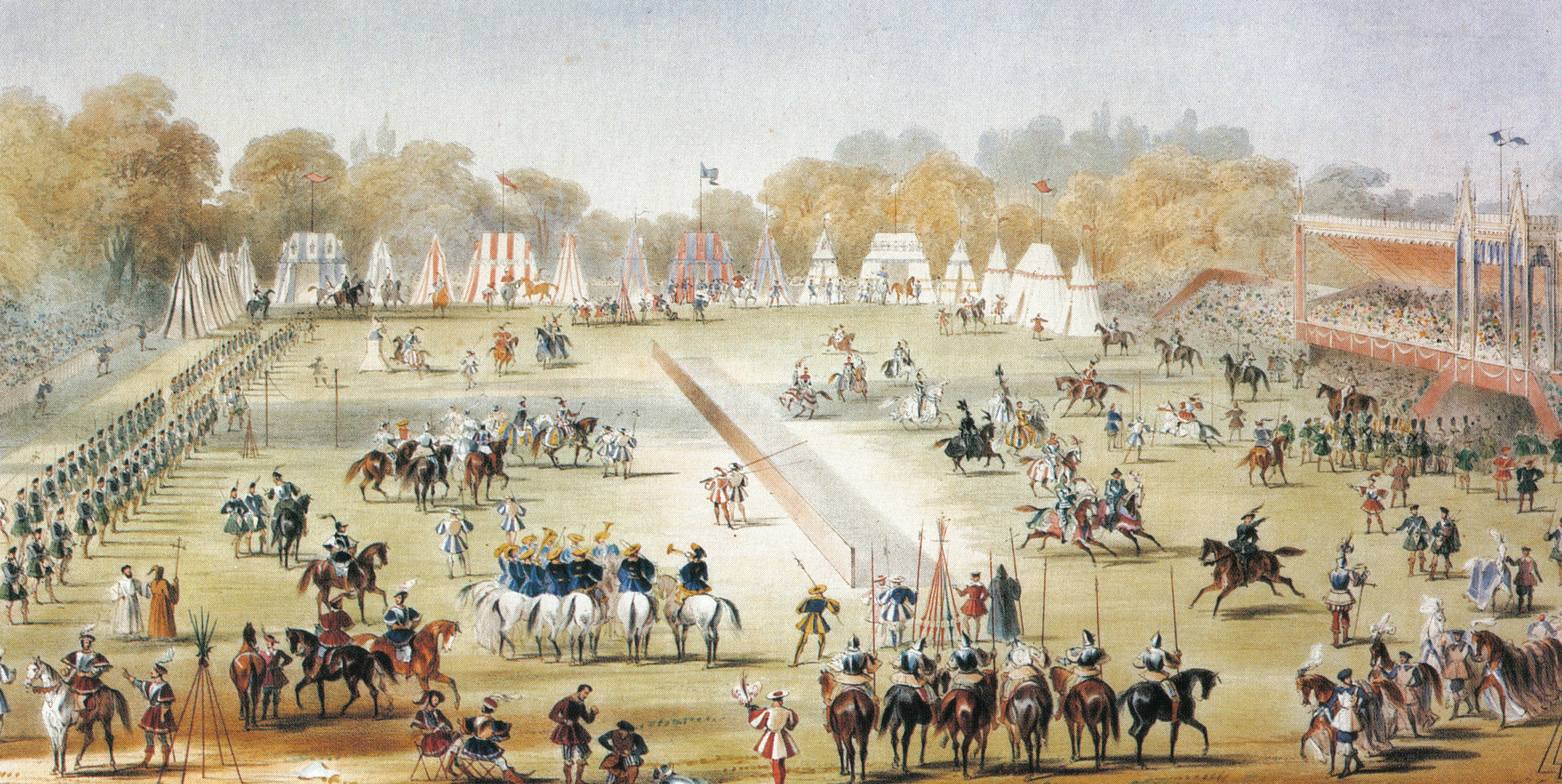
A view of the lists.

The tiltyard was designed by Samuel Luke Pratt, with stands to hold 2,000. Pratt's grandstand roof, was a work of art in splendid scarlet, but, after days of rain and now in a new rainstorm of freak severity, it started to leak badly.

After the tournament Lord Eglinton appeared in the lists, apologised for the rain, and announced that, weather permitting, they would try to joust again the next day or the next. Then he announced to the special guests in the grandstand that the medieval banquet and ball that evening would have to be cancelled as banqueting tents had also succumbed to the weather.

The rains had flooded the Lugton Water, which ran around the Lists on three sides. No carriages could cross it, so the entire audience, apart from Eglinton's personal guests, was stranded without transport. They had to walk miles through the rain and the mud to nearby villages, where only the first people found any food, drink, accommodation or transport.

=== 29 August ===
The next morning, Eglinton consulted with the other participants at the tournament. They agreed to hold a second joust on 30 August. The estate staff set about repairing the damage to the site, including attempting to drain the Lists and mending the grandstand.

=== 30 August ===
The weather for the final day of the tournament was much better, and crowds gathered again to watch, albeit with fewer in fancy dress. The procession took place, followed by jousting, which was won by James Fairlie on points, although Eglington was nominated the symbolic victor. Edward Jerningham suffered an injury, and required medical attention. A melée was held, during which Henry Waterford and John Alford had to be separated by the marshal. Although the day went well, the heavy mud in the Lists continued to cause the knights difficulties.

The formal ball concluded the day, commencing with a medieval banquet for 400 people. The dinner was designed to follow authentic medieval recipes, and was served on gold and silver dishes specially manufactured for the occasion. The ball had 2,000 guests, most in medieval costume, who were entertained by an orchestra and the band of the 2nd Dragoon Guards. Heavy rain returned towards the end of the ball, and it was agreed to call the tournament to a close.

== Aftermath ==
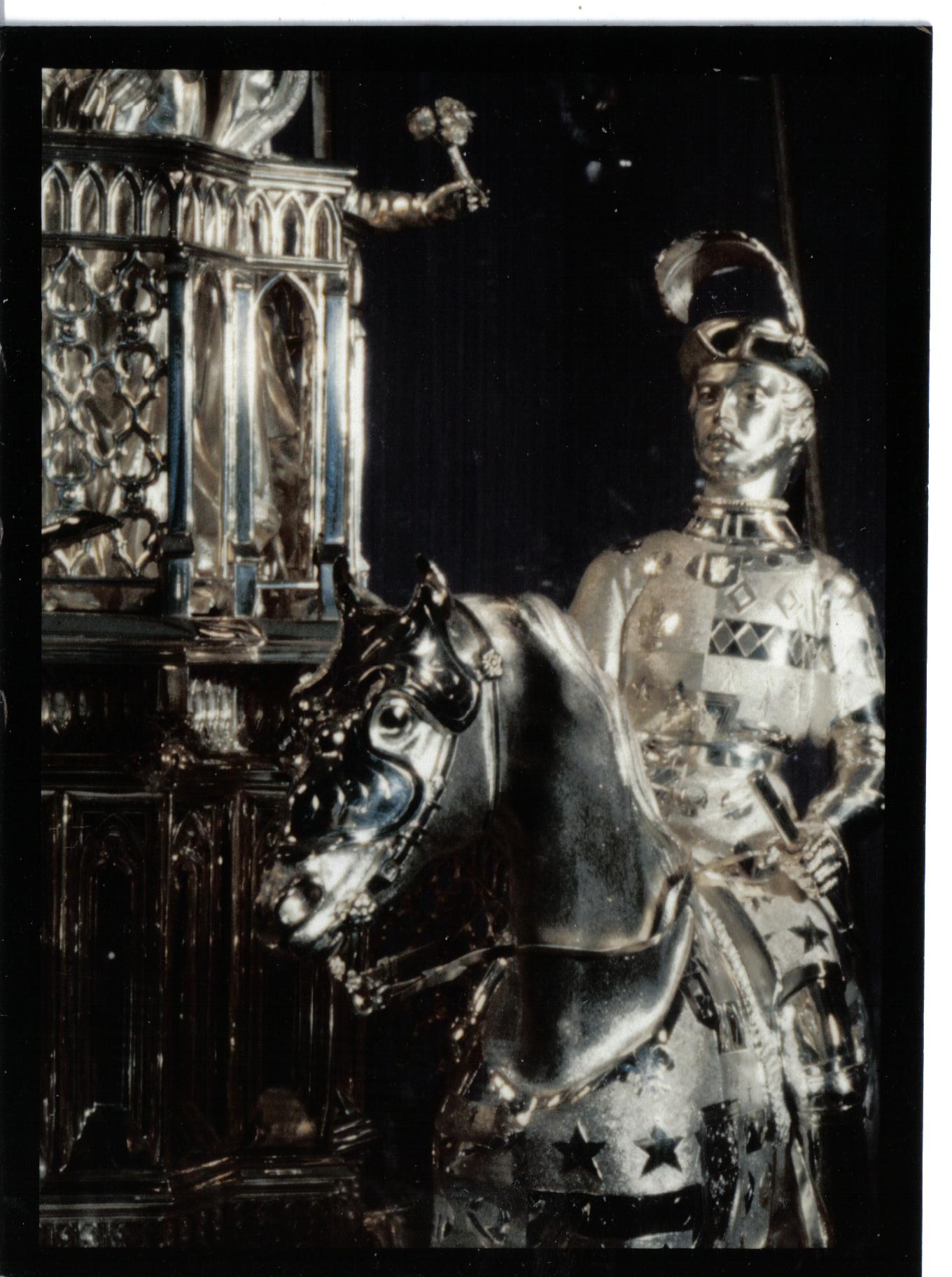
Eglinton Trophy detail of the Earl's armour.

The Eglinton Tournament became part of English popular culture. Astley's Amphitheatre in London used it to promote their own medieval reenactment, which was a commercial success, and the tournament was parodied in a pantomime at Covent Garden.

The Eglinton Trophy or Eglinton Testimonial is a Gothic style one metre high silver centrepiece presented to the 13th Earl of Eglinton by friends and admirers to commemorate the 'Eglinton Tournament'.

Panoramas illustrated the tournament, using long strips of painted canvas wound round a tube and slowly unwound to give a view of the event. The venue was Edinburgh in 1839 or 1840.

== Heritage ==
The tournament inspired a successor event at Earls' Court, London, in July 1912.

Armour used at the tournament has been preserved in the Leeds Armoury, Kelvingrove Museum, Dean Castle and elsewhere. The family sold the Earl of Eglinton's own armour during the 1925 sale of the castle contents.

The remnants of the tournament were sold off at a public auction and the glasses and crystal used in the marquees for the medieval ball and feast were sold off soon after. A ship named the 'Eglinton' was partly constructed from the wood used for the jousting arena.

The bow used at the tournament by one of the Cochran-Patrick family of Ladyland House is preserved in the Kilwinning Abbey Tower Museum. This bow was made by David Muir of Kilwinning, using Degame wood, otherwise known as lemonwood.

The flag that flew over the castle bearing the earl's coat of arms was eventually donated to North Ayrshire Council and is now kept in the North Ayrshire Heritage Centre.

The Gothic bridge now at the site of the tournament was not actually built at the time of the tournament and even the previous bridge, originally located 100 yards further up the river, had been in place for at least 25 years at the time of the tournament. The label Tournament Bridge has stuck, despite the inaccuracy. Contemporary engravings and paintings show that it was however heavily embellished with Gothic additions for the event and possibly an ornamental archway.

As 1989 was the 150th anniversary of the tournament, the staff of the newly opened Eglinton Country Park organised a re-enactment which ran over a period of three days in August of that year.

In May 2011 East Ayrshire Council held an exhibition entitled 1839 a Gothic adventure at the Dick Institute, Kilmarnock and published a book with that title. The Eglinton Trophy was loaned by the Earl of Eglinton and North Ayrshire Council for the duration. Two medals produced to commemorate the 1839 exhibition were on display.

The Tournament

The Tournament

Duchess of Somerset, Queen of Beauty

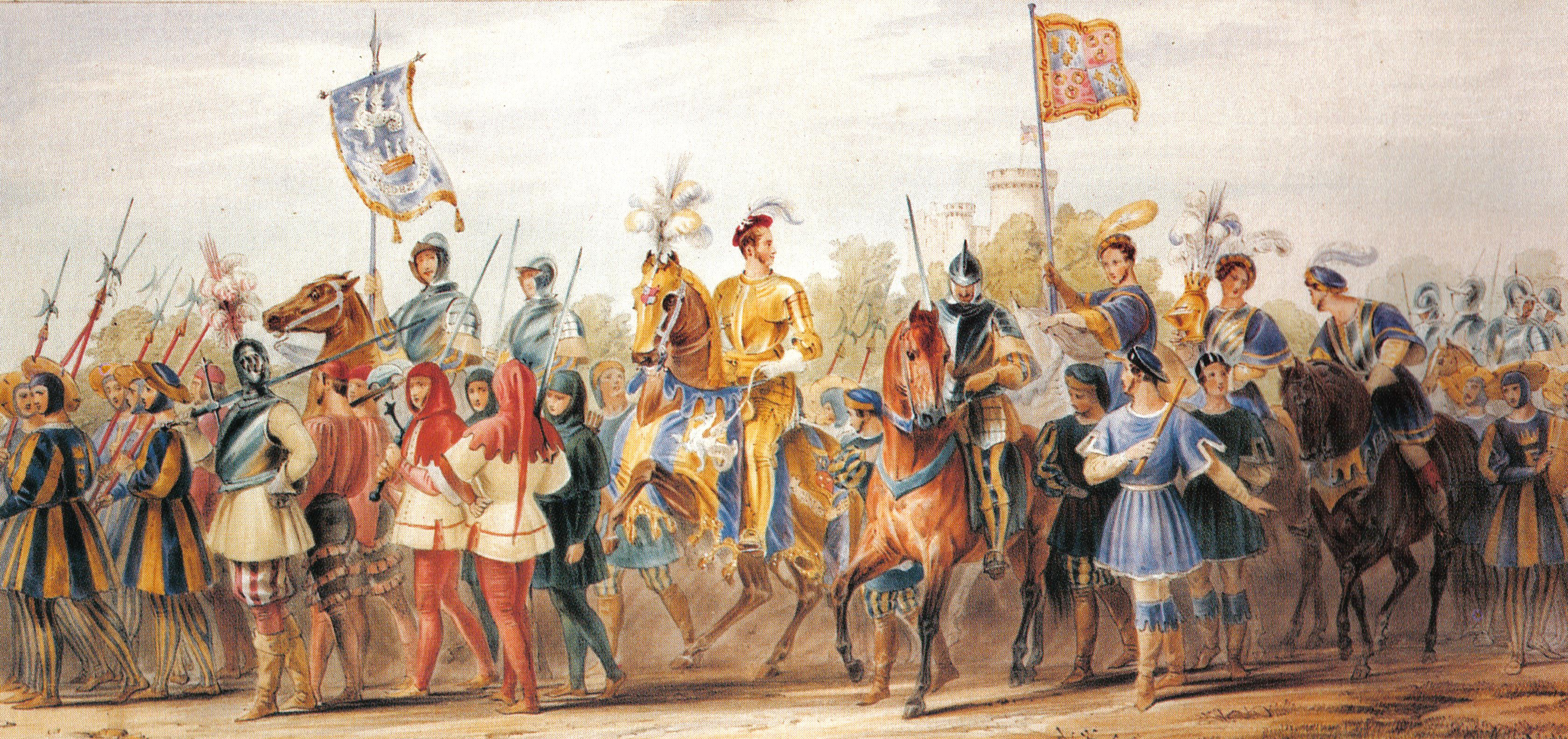
Archibald, Earl of Eglinton, Lord of the Tournament

The Procession to the Lists

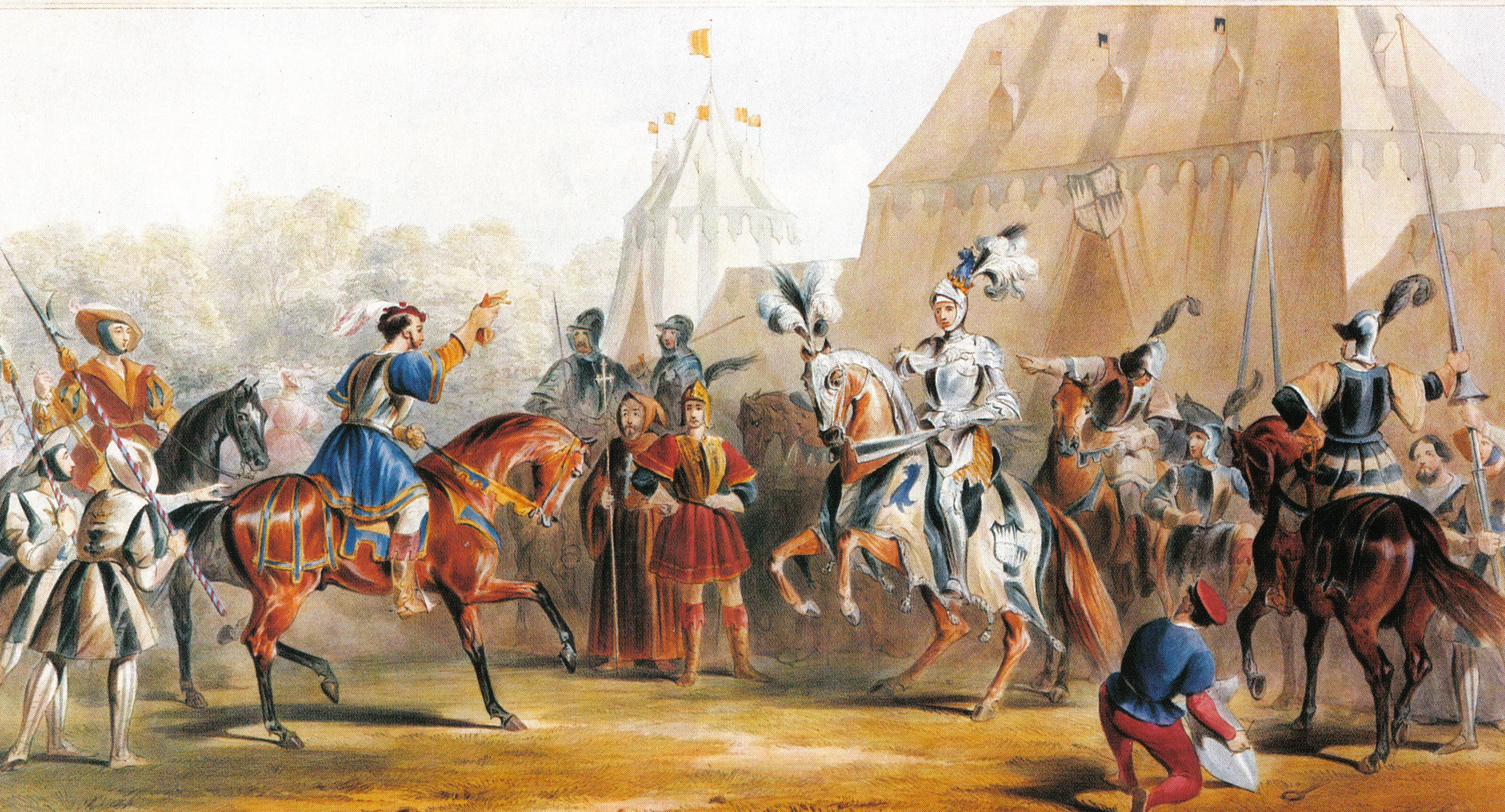
The Challenge

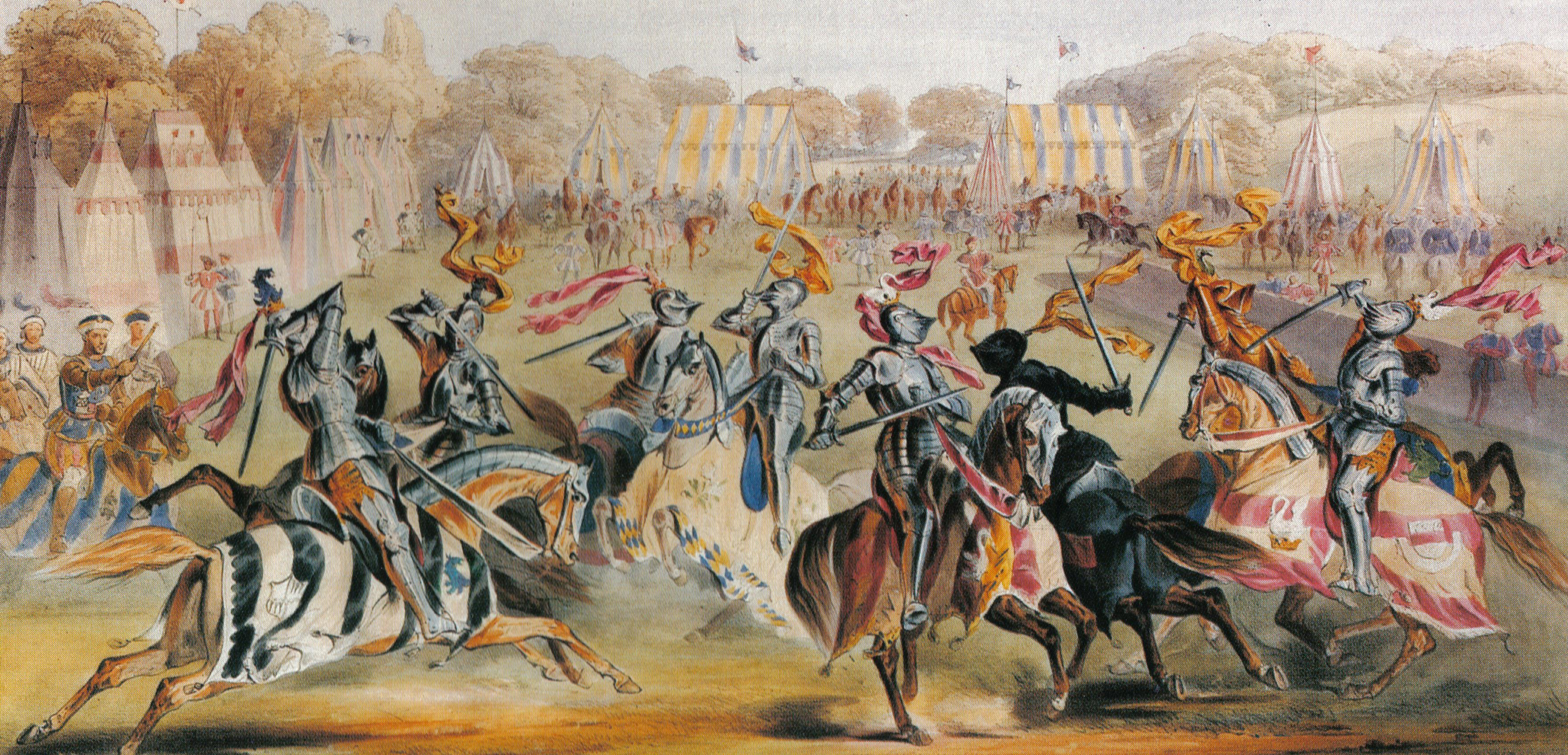
The Melée

The Joust

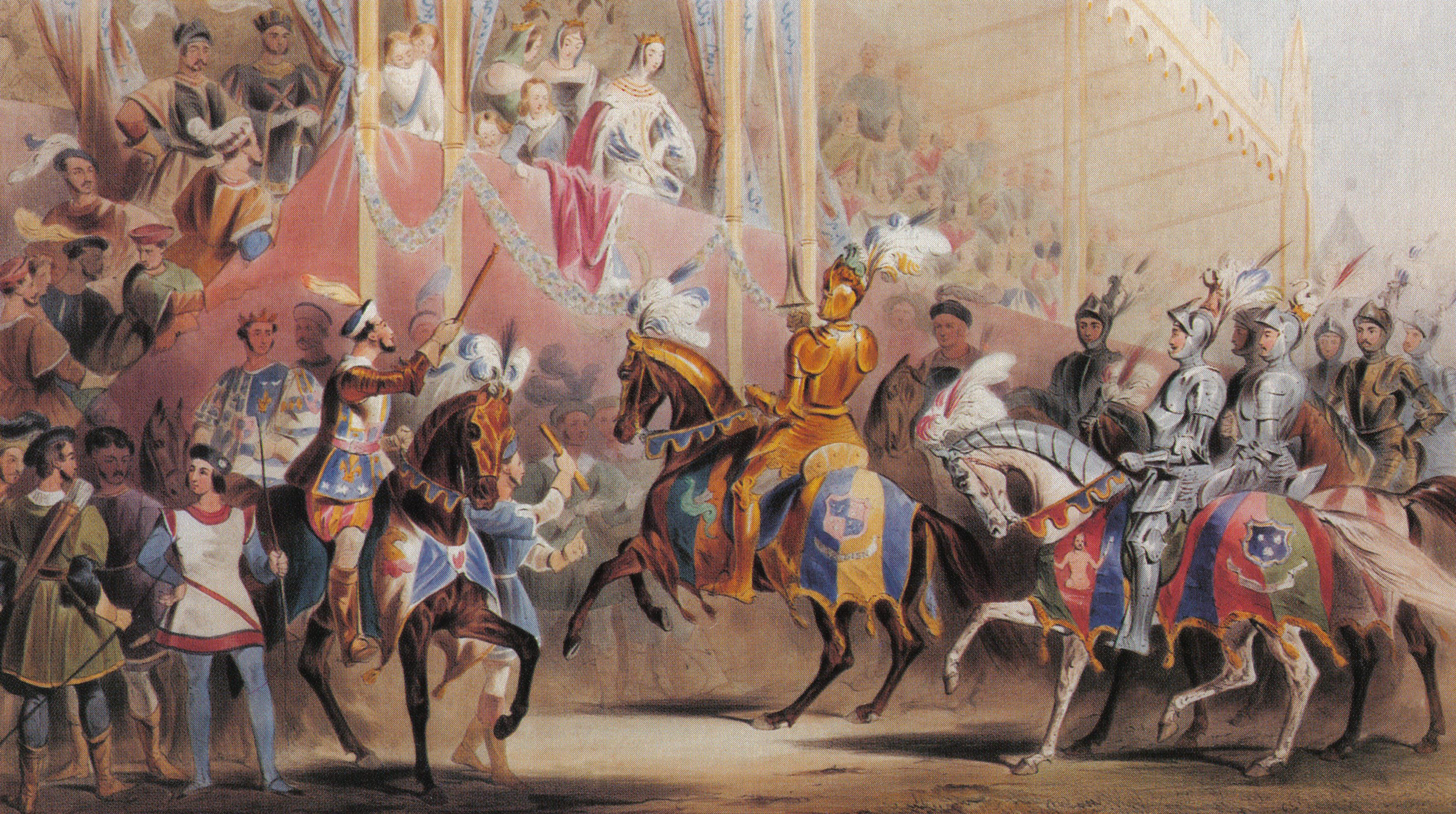
The Presentation

The Banquet and ball

The Banquet and ball

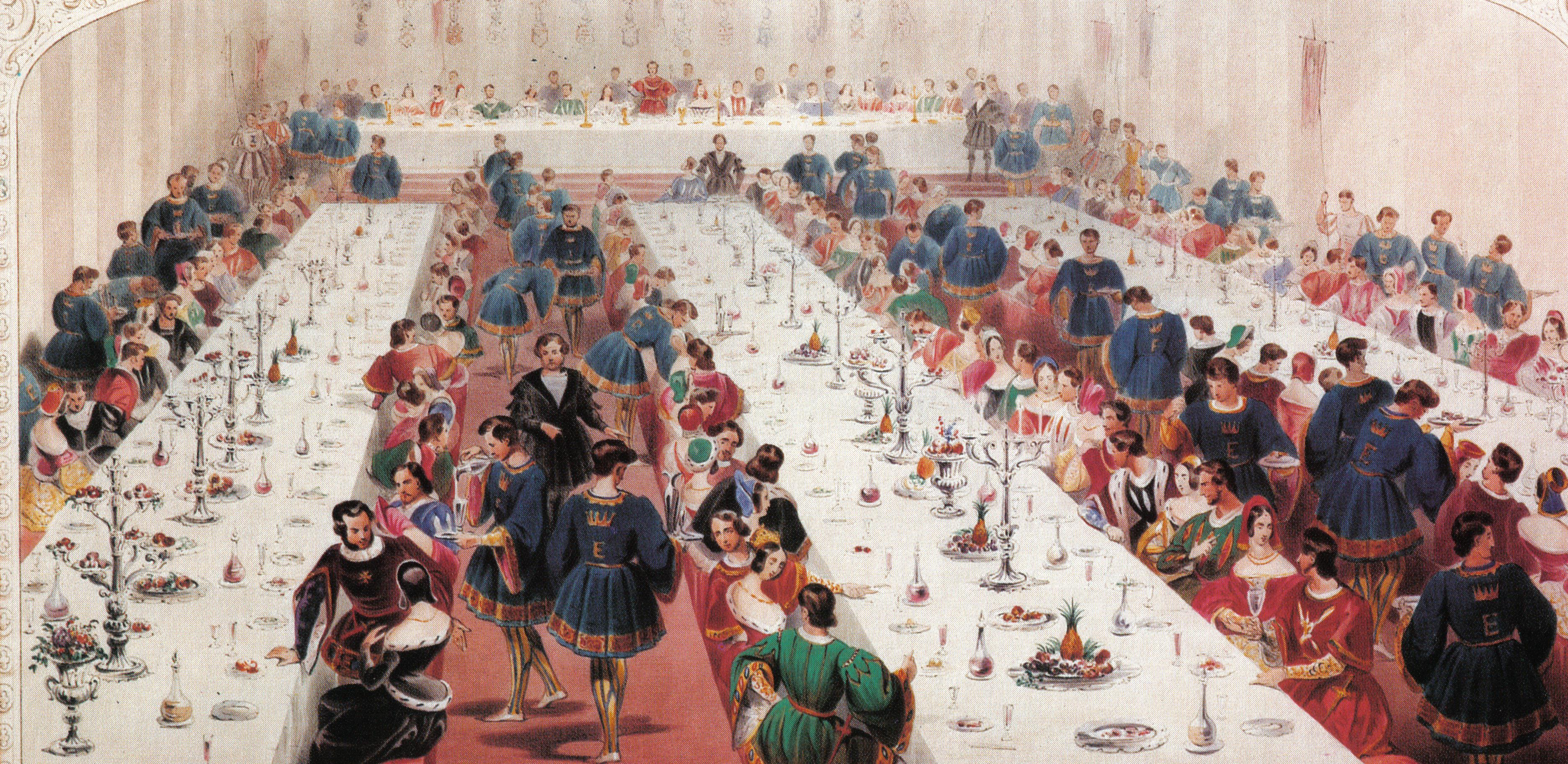
The Banquet

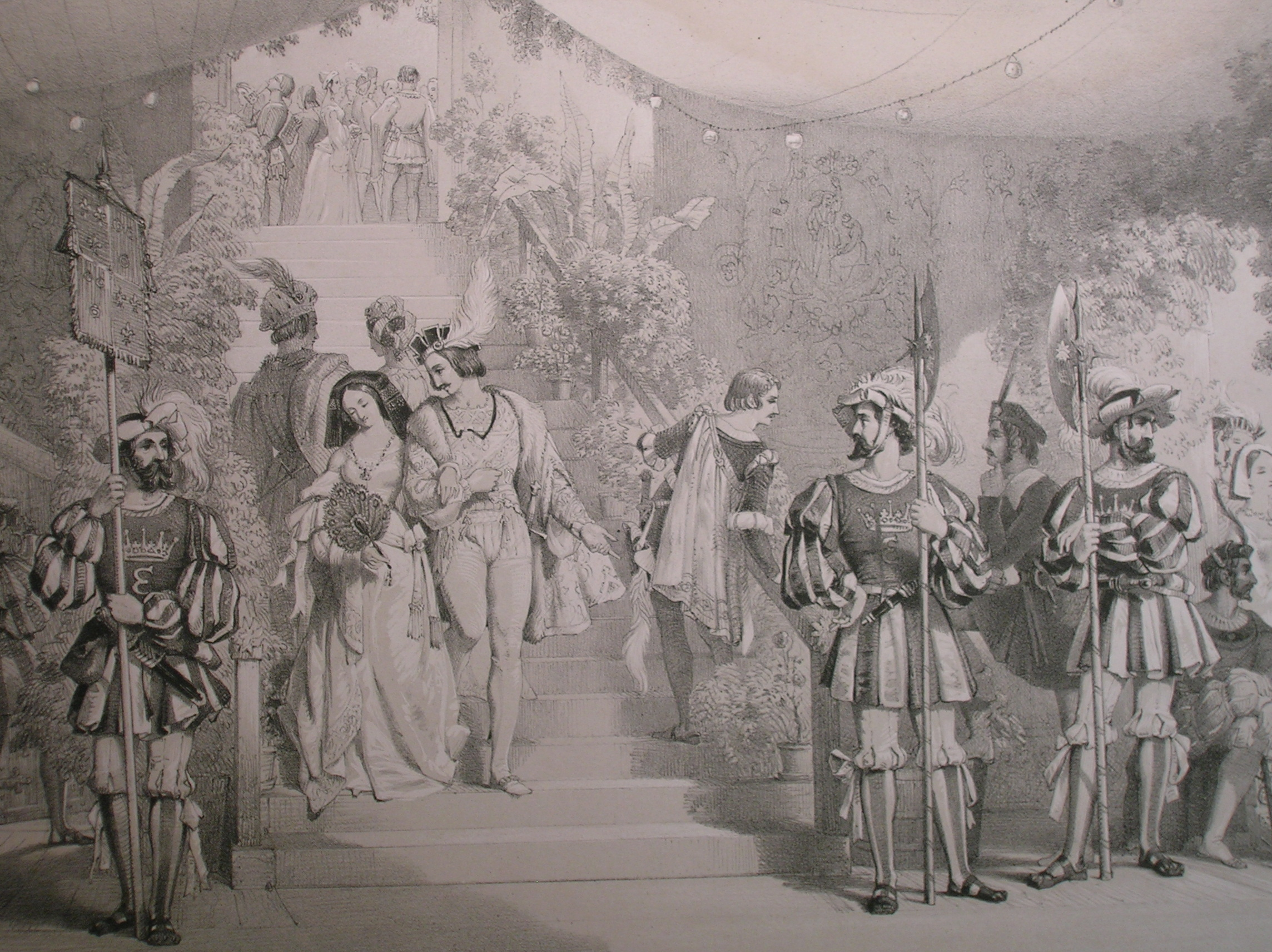
The staircase to the ballroom at Eglinton Castle

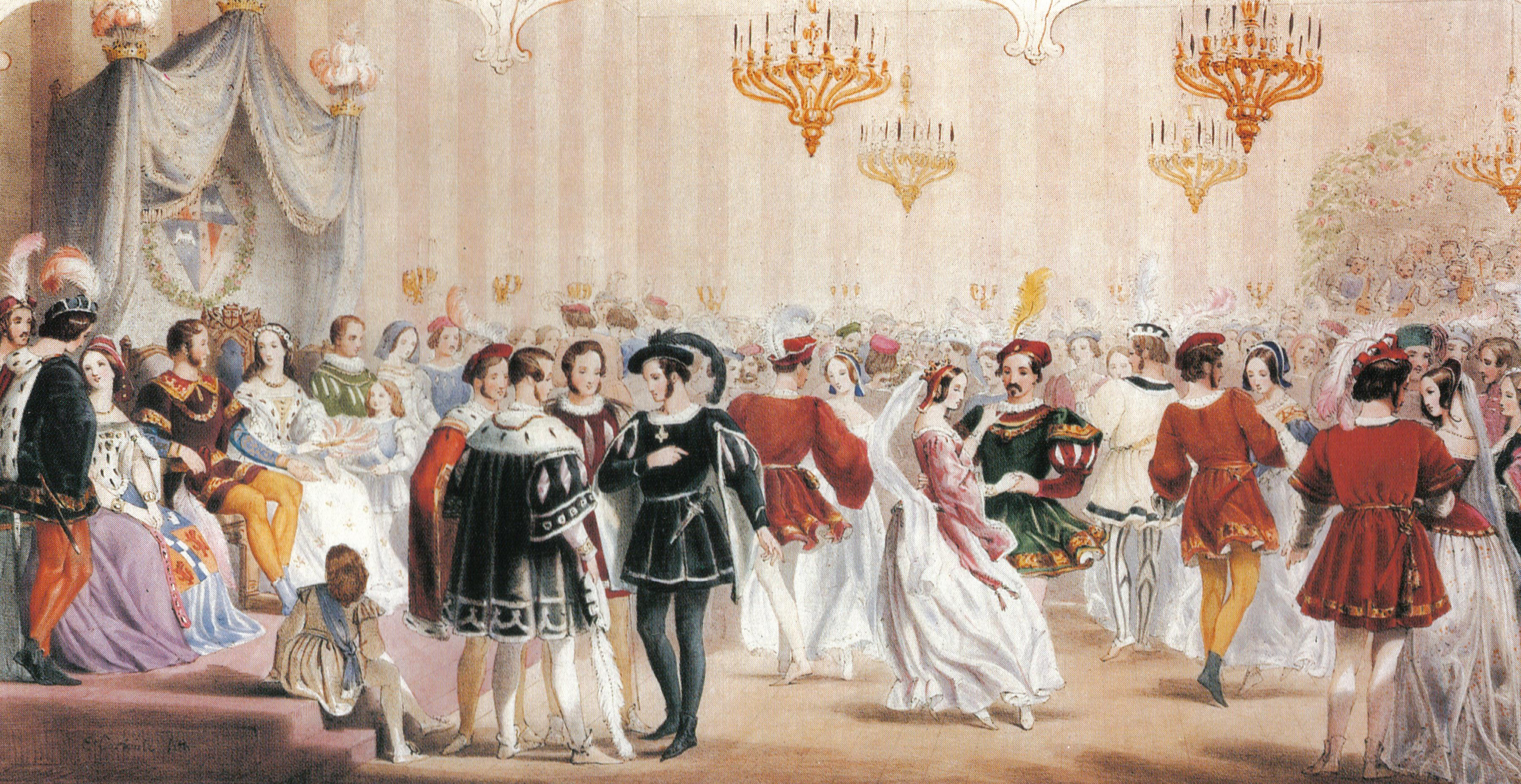
The Ball

== Notable participants ==
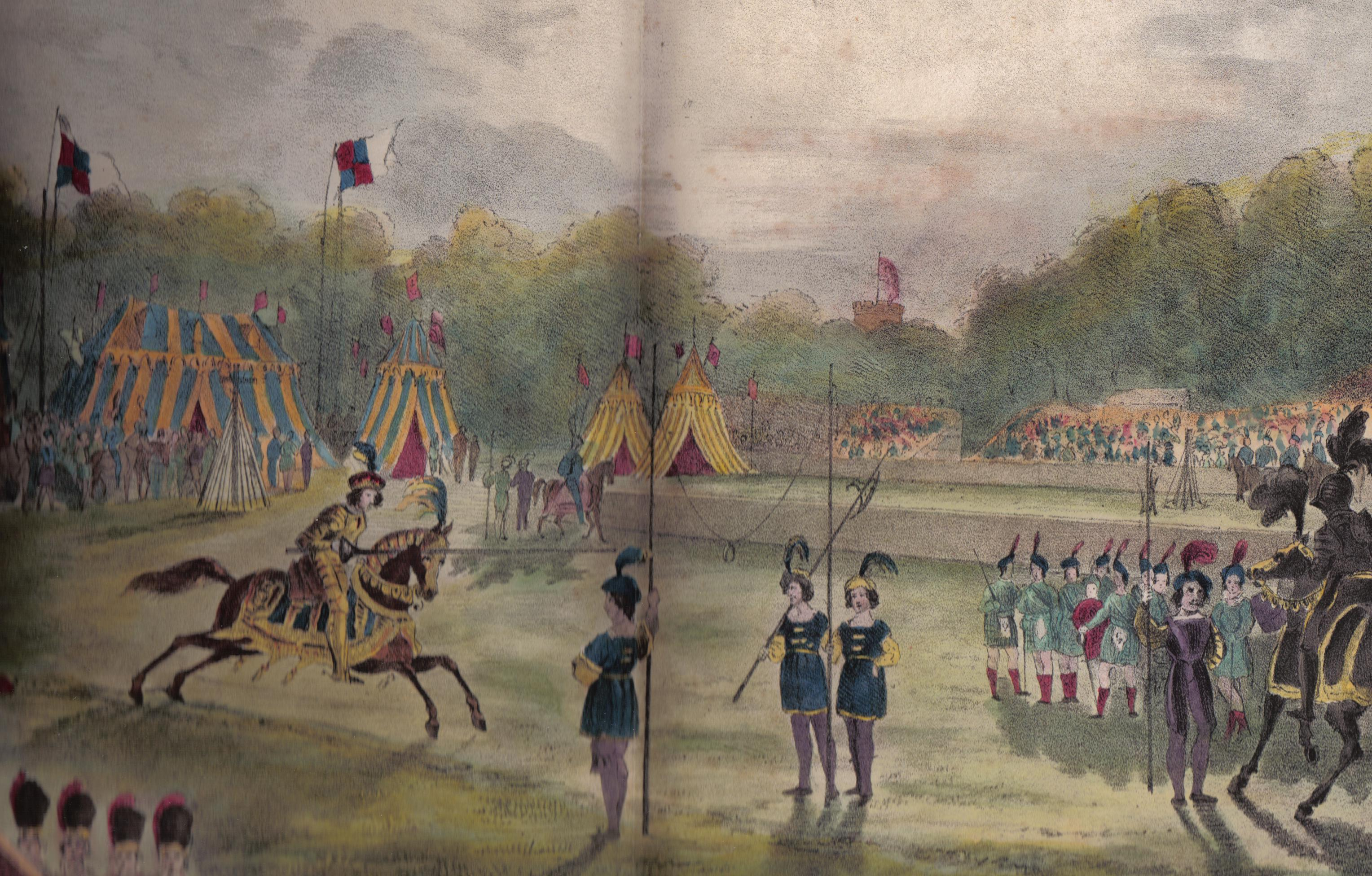
A knight tilting at a ring at the Eglinton Tournament.

The "knights" who participated in the tournament were, apart from Eglinton

- John, Viscount Alford, aged 27, "Knight of the Black Lion"
- Captain Beresford, aged 32, "Knight of the Stag's Head"
- Archibald, Earl of Cassillis, aged 23, "Knight of the Dolphin"
- William, Earl of Craven, aged 30, "Knight of the Griffin"
- Captain (Ayrshire Yeomanry) James O. Fairlie, aged 30, "Knight of the Golden Lion"
- the Hon. H. E. H. Gage, aged 25, "Knight of the Ram"
- George Viscount of Glenlyon, aged 25, "Knight of the Gael"
- Sir Francis Hopkins, Bart., aged 26, "Knight of the Burning Tower"
- the Hon. Edward Jerningham, aged 35, "Knight of the Swan"
- Charles Lamb, aged 23, "Knight of the White Rose"
- Richard Lechemere, aged 40, "Knight of the Red Rose"
- Walter Little Gilmour, aged 32, "The Black Knight"
- Henry, Marquess of Waterford, aged 28, "Knight of the Dragon"

Other participants and guests included

- Cropley, Earl of Shaftesbury
- Charles, Marquess of Londonderry
- Prince Louis Napoleon
- Princess Esterhazy of Hungary
- Count Persigny of France
- Count Lubeski of Poland

== Bibliography ==
- Aikman, J & Gordon, W. An account of the tournament at Eglinton, revised and corrected by several of the knights: with a biographical notice of the Eglinton family to which is prefixed a sketch of chivalry and of the most remarkable Scottish tournaments. Edinburgh: Hugh Paton, Carver & Gilder, 1839.
- Anstruther, Ian The Knight and the Umbrella: An Account of the Eglinton Tournament, 1839. London: Geoffrey Bles Ltd, 1963.
- Buchan, Peter The Eglinton Tournament and Gentleman Unmasked 1840.
- Clements, James. Stevenston. Kernel of Cunninghame. Glasgow: Gilmour and Lawrence, 1974.
- Corbould, Edward. The Eglinton Tournament: Dedicated to the Earl of Eglinton. Pall Mall, England: Hodgson & Graves, 1840.
- Curling, H (1839). Some Account of The Field of the Cloth of Gold of Eglintoun. Sampson Low..
- Doyle, Richard. The Eglinton Tournament, 1840
- Dunlop, J. (2011). 1830 a Gothic adventure. East Ayrshire Council. ISBN 978-0-9550546-4-8.
- Girouard, Mark The Return to Camelot: Chivalry and the English Gentleman Yale University Press, 1981. ISBN 0-300-02739-7
- Guide to The Tournament at Eglinton Castle on 28th AND 29th AUGUST, 1839. Irvine : Maxwell Dick.
- The Irvine Herald and Kilwinning Chronicle. Friday 6 May 2011.
- Mancoff, Debra. The Return of King Arthur: the Legend Through Victorian Eyes. New York: H.N. Abrams, 1995. ISBN 0-8109-3782-4
- Montgomerie, (1988), Tarbolton Heritage Project, MSC.
- Montgomerie, Viva Seton (1954). My Scrapbook of Memories. Draft copy. Eglinton Archive, Eglinton Country Park.
- Ness, John (1990). Kilwinning Encyclopedia. Kilwinning and District Preservation Society.
- Paterson, James (1863–66). History of the Counties of Ayr and Wigton. V. — II — Cunninghame. Edinburgh: J. Stillie.
- Robertson, William. Historical Tales and Legends of Ayrshire Vol.II. London: Hamilton, Adams & Co, 1889.
- Stein, Richard L. (1989), "Victoria's year: English literature and culture, 1837–1838"
- Stevenson, Sara & Bennett, Helen (1978). Van Dyck in Check Trousers. Fancy Dress in Art and Life 1700–1900. The Eglinton Tournament. Scottish National Portrait Gallery.
- Stoddart, John. Remarks on Local Scenery and Manners in Scotland during the years 1799 and 1800. London: William Miller, 1801.
- Swinney, Sarah Abigail (2009). Knights of the quill: The Arts of the Eglinton Tournament. Texas: Baylor University.
- Taylor, James. The Age We Live In. A History of the Nineteenth Century. London: William Mackenzie, 1900.
- Watts, Karen, 2009, "The Eglinton Tournament of 1839".
- "A Festival, A Tournament, and a Jubilee", from The United States Democratic Review Volume 15, Issue 76, October 1844.
